= Varna, Bulgaria =

City in Bulgaria

Varna Варна
- City
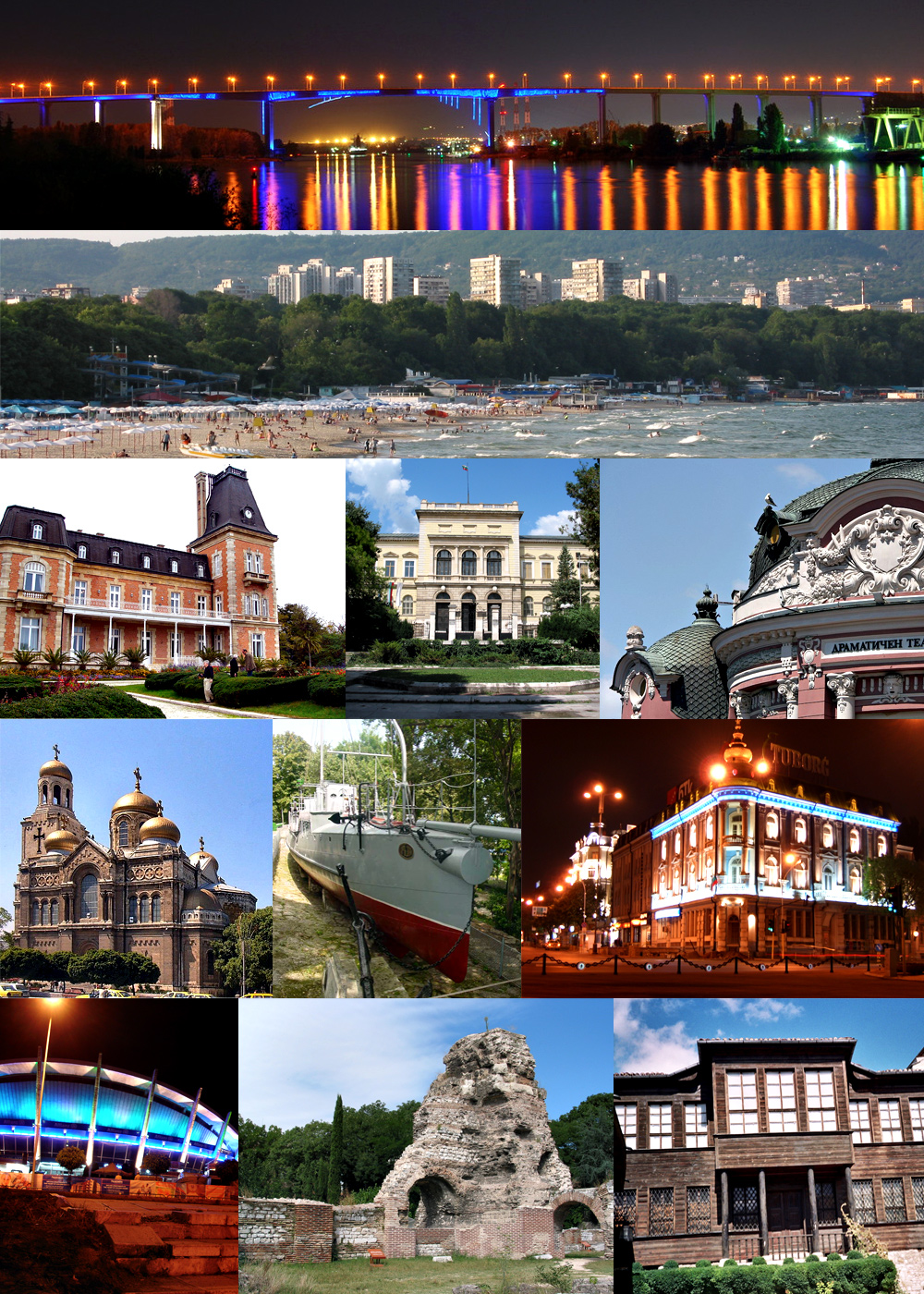
- From top left: Asparuh Bridge, Black Sea beach, Euxinograd, Varna Archaeological Museum, Stoyan Bachvarov Dramatic Theatre, Dormition of the Mother of God Cathedral, Drazki torpedo boat, The Navy Club, Palace of Culture and Sports, The ancient Roman baths, Varna Ethnographic Museum

- Flag Coat of arms
- Nicknames: The marine capital The summer capital
- Location of Varna city in Bulgaria Varna (Balkans) Varna (Black Sea)
- Coordinates: 43°13′N 27°55′E
- Country: Bulgaria
- Province: Varna
- Municipality: Varna
- First settled: 575 BC

Government
  - Mayor: Blagomir Kotsev (PP–DB)

Area
  - Total: 232 km^{2} (90 sq mi)
- Elevation: 80 m (260 ft)

Population (2025)
  - City: 322,683
  - City density: 1,400/km^{2} (3,600/sq mi)
  - Urban: 417,224
- Demonym(s): Varnéan (en); Варненци/Varnentsi (bg)
- Time zone: UTC+2 (EET)
  - Summer (DST): UTC+3 (EEST)
- Postcode: 9000
- Area code: (+359) 52
- Vehicle registration plate: B
- Website: www.varna.bg

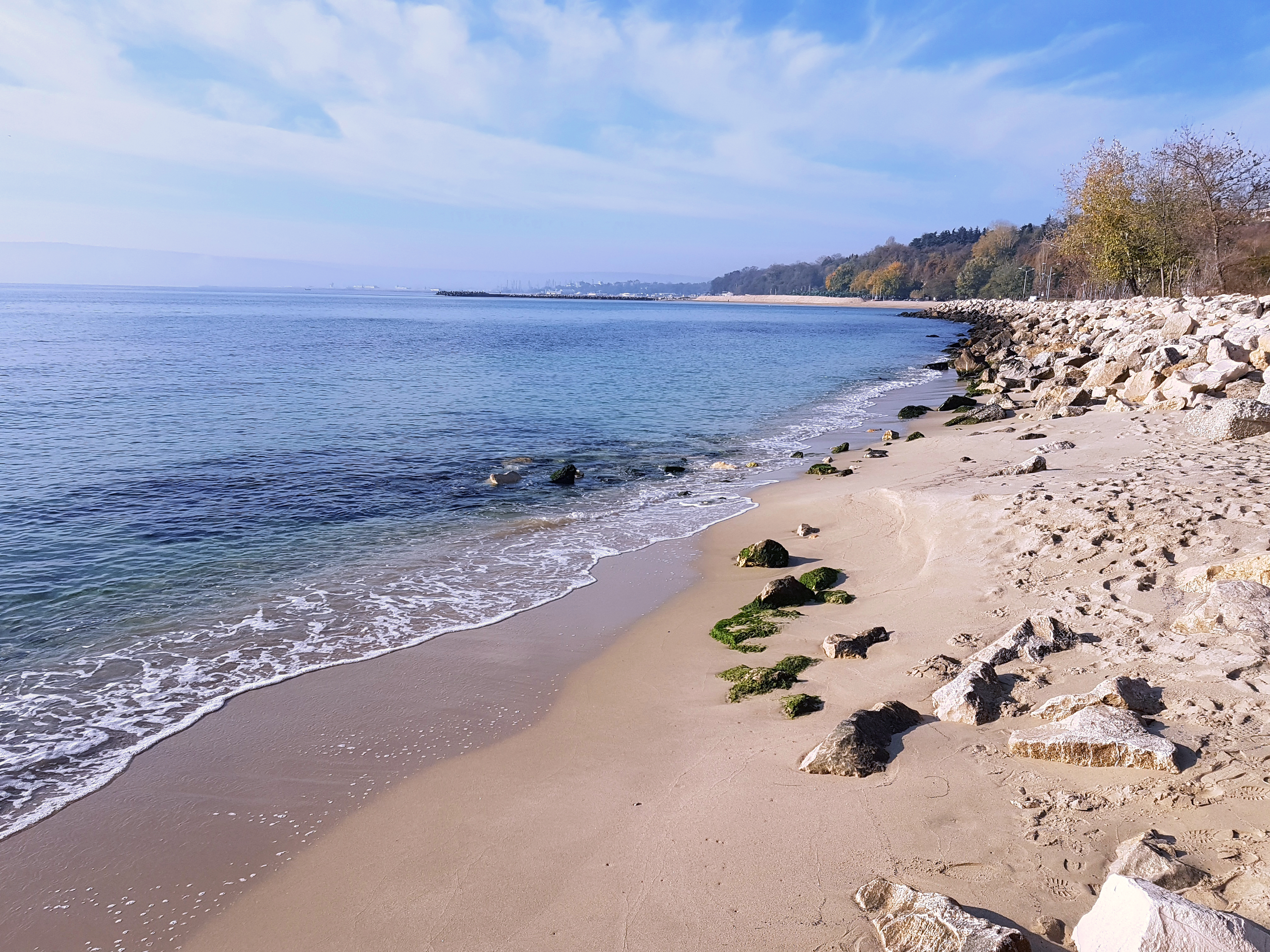
Varna Sea beach

Varna (Bulgarian: Варна, pronounced [ˈvarnɐ]) is the third-largest city in Bulgaria and the largest city and seaside resort on the Bulgarian Black Sea Coast and in the Northern Bulgaria region. Situated strategically in the Gulf of Varna, the city has been a major economic, social, and cultural centre for almost three millennia. Historically known as Odessos (Ancient Greek: Ὀδησσός), Varna developed from a Thracian seaside settlement into a major seaport on the Black Sea.

Varna is a significant hub for business, transportation, education, tourism, entertainment, and healthcare. The city is referred to as the maritime capital of Bulgaria and is home to the headquarters of the Bulgarian Navy and merchant marine. In 2008, Varna was designated as the seat of the Black Sea Euroregion by the Council of Europe. In 2014, Varna was awarded the title of European Youth Capital 2017.

The oldest gold treasure in the world, belonging to the Varna culture, was discovered in the Varna Necropolis and dated to 4600–4200 BC. Since the discovery of the Varna Necropolis in 1974, 294 burial sites have been excavated, with over 3000 golden items inside.

== Etymology ==
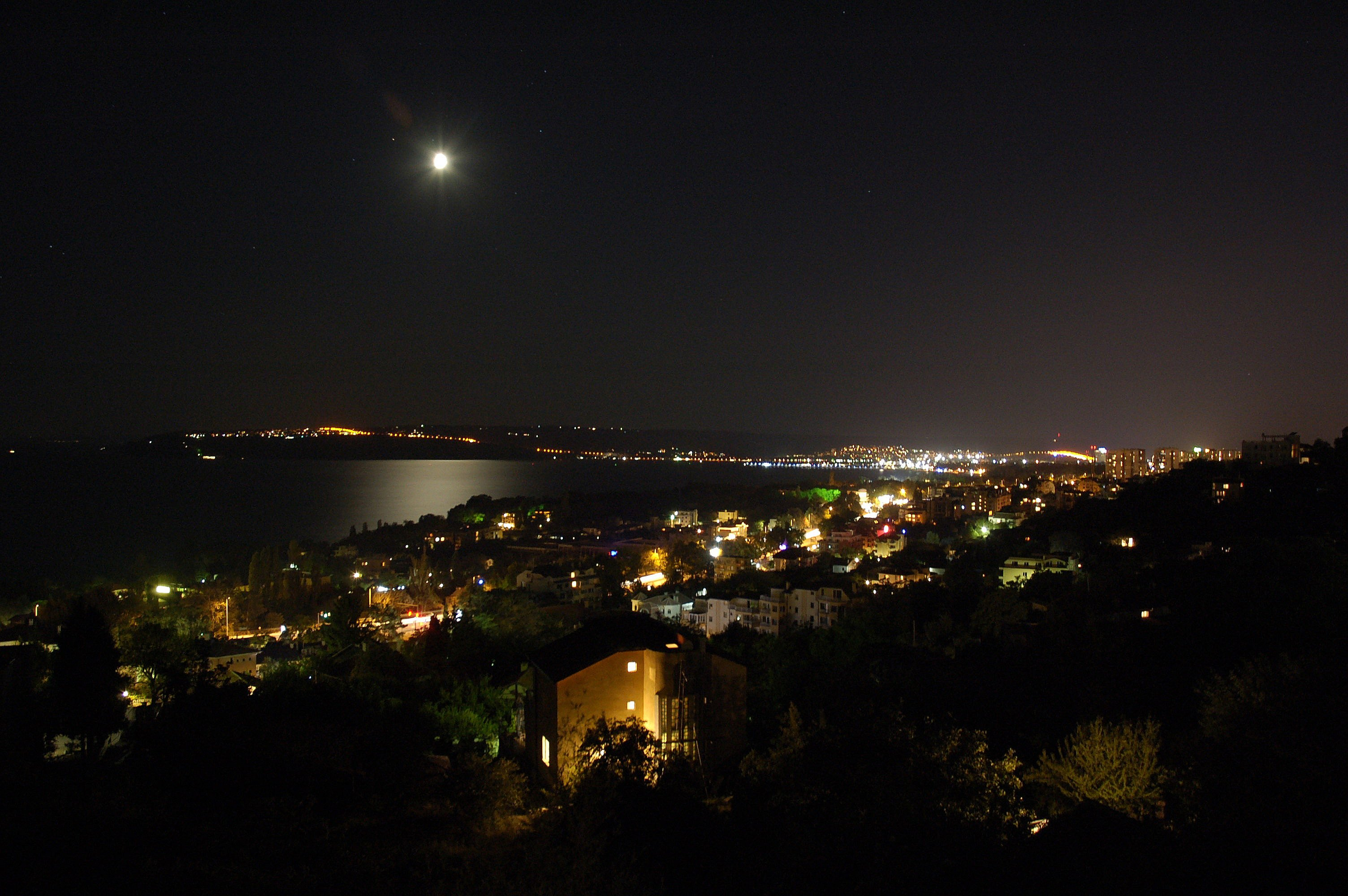
Varna at night

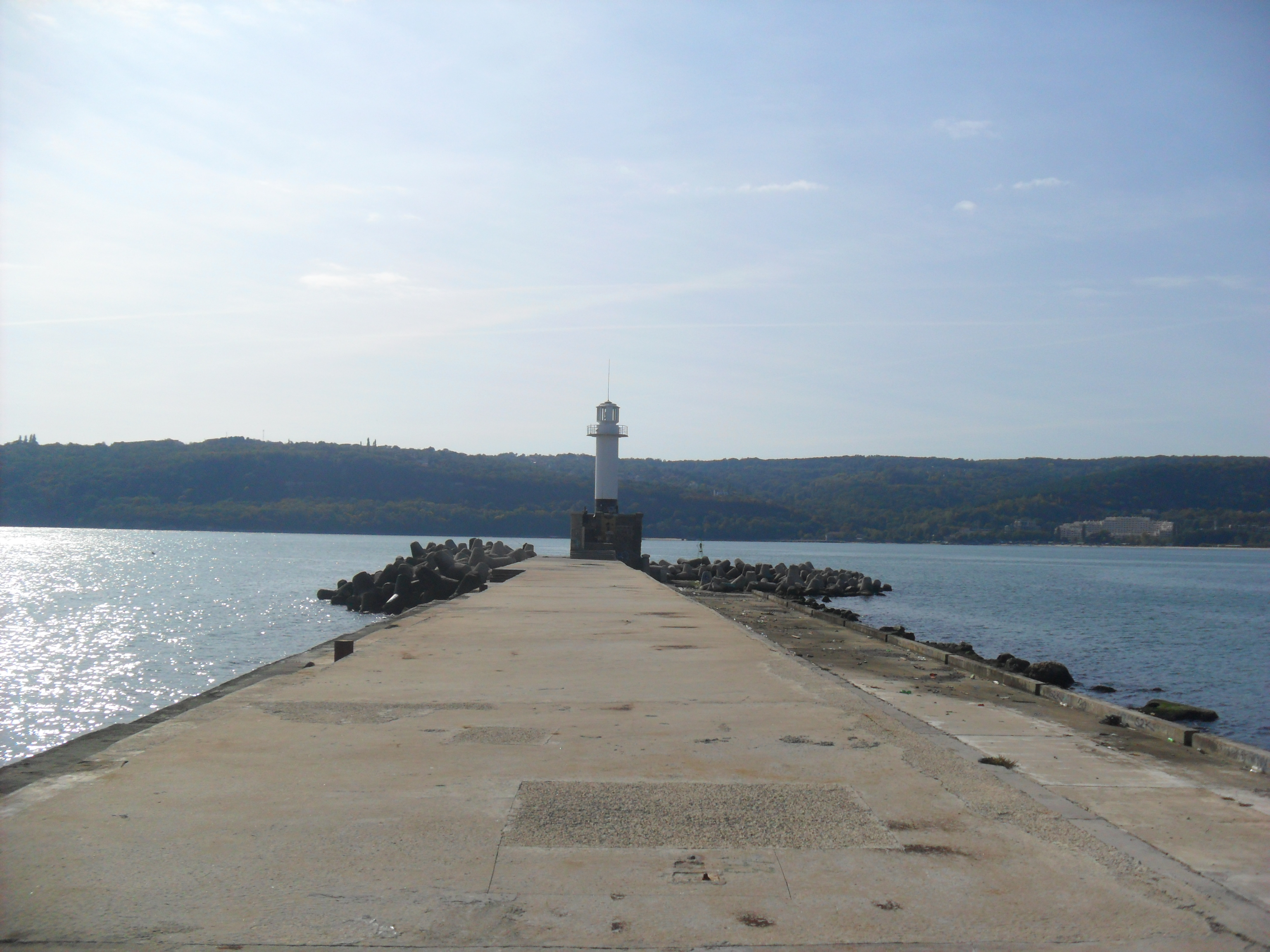
Lighthouse in Varna

Theophanes the Confessor first mentions the name Varna, as the city came to be known, within the context of the Slavic conquest of the Balkans in the 6th to 7th centuries. The name could be of Varangian origin, as Varangians had been crossing the Black Sea for many years, reaching Constantinople in the early Middle Ages. In Swedish, värn means 'shield, defense' – hence Varna could mean 'defended, fortified place'. Vikings invaded the settlement during the Middle Ages. The name may be older than that; perhaps it derives from the Proto-Indo-European root *u̯er- 'to flow, wet, water, river' (cf. Varuna), or from the Proto-Slavic root varn 'black', or from Iranian bar or var 'camp, fortress' (see also Etymological list of provinces of Bulgaria).

According to Theophanes, in 680, Asparukh, the founder of the First Bulgarian Empire, routed an army of Constantine IV near the Danube River delta. Pursuing those forces, he reached "the so-called Varna near Odyssos [sic] and the midlands thereof" (τὴν λεγομένην Βάρναν, πλησίον Ὀδυσσοῦ). Perhaps the new name applied initially to an adjacent river or lake, a Roman military camp, or an inland area, and only later to the city itself.

By the late 10th century, the name Varna was established so firmly that when Byzantines wrested back control of the area from the Bulgarians around 975, they kept it rather than restoring the ancient name Odessos.

== History ==
=== Prehistory ===
Prehistoric settlements are best known for the Chalcolithic necropolis (mid-5th millennium BC radiocarbon dating), a key archaeological site in world prehistory, the eponymous Varna culture, and internationally regarded as the world's oldest large find of gold artifacts, which existed within modern city limits. In the wider region of the Varna lakes (before the 1900s, freshwater) and the adjacent karst springs and caves, over 30 prehistoric settlements have been unearthed, with the earliest artefacts dating back to the Middle Paleolithic or 100,000 years ago.

=== Thracians ===
Since the late Bronze Age (13th–12th c. BC), the area around Odessos had been populated with Thracians. During the 8th–9th c. BC local Thracians had active commercial and cultural contacts with people from Anatolia, Thessaly, the Caucasus, and the Mediterranean Sea. These links were reflected in some local productions, for example, forms of bronze fibula of the age, either imported or locally made. There is no doubt that interactions occurred mostly by sea, and the bay of Odessos is one of the places where the exchanges took place. Some scholars consider that during the 1st millennium BC, the region was also settled by the half-mythical Cimmerians. An example of their, probably accidental, presence is the tumulus dated 8th–7th c. BC found near Belogradets, Varna Province.

The region around Odessos was densely populated with Thracians long before the coming of the Greeks to the western seashore of the Black Sea. Pseudo-Scymnus writes: "...Around the city [Odessos] lives the Thracian tribe named Crobises." This is also evidenced by various ceramic pottery, made by hand or by a Potter's wheel, bronze ornaments for horse-fittings, and iron weapons, all found in Thracian necropolises dated 6th–4th c. BC near the villages of Dobrina, Kipra, Brestak, and others, all in Varna Province. The Thracians in the region were ruled by kings, who entered into unions with the Odrysian kingdom, Getae, or Sapaeans—large Thracian states existing between the 5th and 1st century BC. Between 336 and 280 BC, these Thracian states, along with Odessos, were conquered by Alexander the Great.

Archaeological findings have indicated that the population of northeast Thrace was very diverse, including the region around Odessos. Between the 6th century BC and the 4th century BC, the region was populated by Scythians who normally inhabited the central Eurasian Steppe (South Russia and Ukraine) and partly the area south of the river Istros (the Thracian name for the lower Danube). Characteristics of their culture, weapons, and bronze objects have been found all over the region. Scythian horse ornaments are produced in "animal style", which is very close to the Thracian style, a possible explanation for the frequent mixture of both folks in northeastern Thrace. Many bronze artefacts give testimony to such a process, for example, applications and front plates for horseheads, as well as moulds for such products in nearby and more distant settlements. Since the 4th century BC the region had been populated by more Getae, which is a Thracian tribe that populated both shores around the Danube Delta.

The Celts started populating the region after they invaded the Balkan peninsula in 280 BC. Throughout northeast Bulgaria and even near Odessos, a significant number of bronze items with Celtic ornaments and typical weapons were discovered, all quickly adopted by Thracians. Arkovna, 80 km near Odessos, was probably the permanent capital of the Celts' last king Kavar (270/260–216/210 BC). Probably after the downfall of his kingdom, Celts blended with the greatly numbered Thracians in the country. Between the 2nd–1st c. BC in the present Dobrudja land, between Dyonissopolis (Balchik) and Odessos, many small Scythian states were established. Their "kings" minted their coins in mints located in cities on the western Black Sea coast, including Odessos.

The Thracians in northeast Thrace seem to be underdeveloped compared to their counterparts in South Thrace. The people lived in two types of settlements: non-fortified, located in fertile lands near water sources, and stone-built fortresses in a hard-to-reach mountain environment, where the kings' residences were usually located. Thracians engaged in farming, wood processing, hunting, and fishing. Among their art crafts is metal processing—especially weapons, excelling processing of bronze, making of bracelets, rings, Thracian type of fibulas, horse ornaments, arrowheads. Local goldsmiths used gold and silver to produce typical Thracian plate armour, ceremonial ornaments for the horses of the kings and the aristocracy, as well as valuable pateras and ritons.

Despite ethnic diversity, numerous internal and external conflicts, and cultural differences, the populations of northeastern Bulgaria and the cities along the seashore have demonstrated stable tolerance to each other. Conservatism is easily noticed in ceramic items and in religion. The highest deity of all was the Thracian horseman, who had different names and functions in different places. Water-related deities were honoured as well, such as the Three Graces or the water Nymphs and Zalmoxis by the Getae. During the centuries, especially by the end of the Hellenistic period (2nd–1st c. BC), Thracians adopted the more elaborate Hellenistic culture, thus acting as an intermediate for the continental Thracians.

=== Antiquity ===
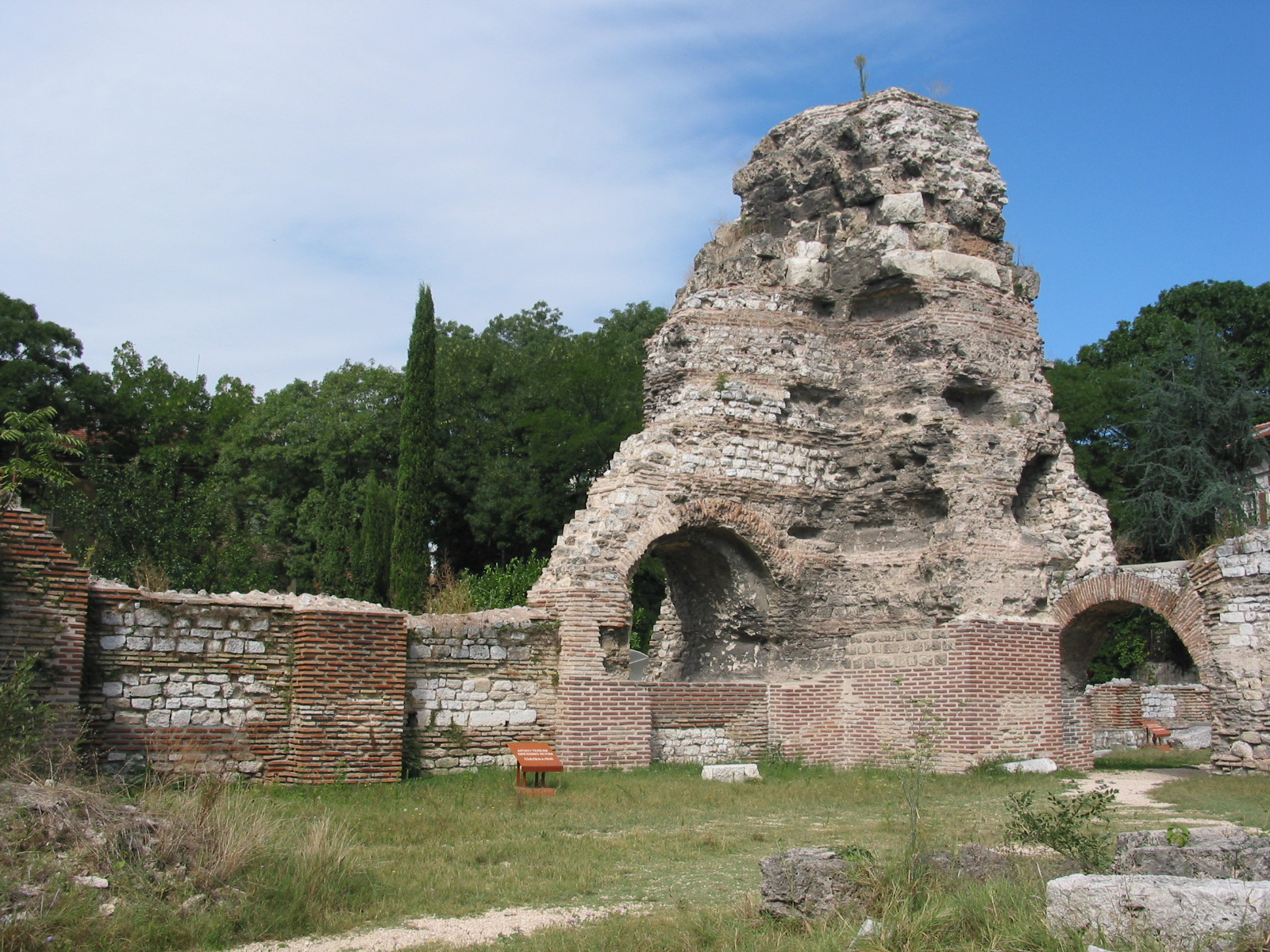
Remains of ancient Roman Odessos

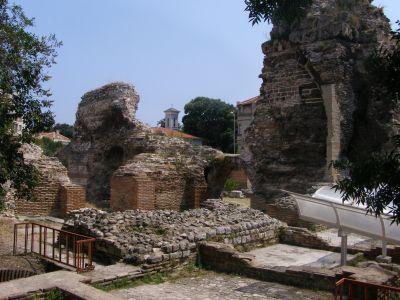
Roman Thermae west apodyterium with St. Athanasius church bell tower in the background

Odessos or Odessus (Ancient Greek: Ὀδησσός) is one of the oldest ancient settlements in Bulgaria. Its name appears as Odesopolis (Ὀδησόπολις) in the Periplus of Pseudo-Scylax; and as Odyssos or Odyssus in the Synecdemus and in Procopius. It was established in the second quarter of the sixth century BC (585–550 BC) by Miletian Greeks on the site of a previous Thracian settlement. The Miletian founded an apoikia (trading post) of Odessos towards the end of the 7th c. BC (the earliest Greek archaeological material is dated 600–575 BC), or, according to Pseudo-Scymnus, in the time of Astyages (here, usually 572–570 BC is suggested), within an earlier Thracian settlement. The name Odessos could have been pre-Greek, arguably of Carian origin. It was the presiding member of the Pontic Pentapolis, consisting of Odessos, Tomi, Callatis, Mesembria, and Apollonia. Odessos was a mixed community—contact zone between the Ionian Greeks and the Thracian tribes (Getae, Krobyzoi, Terizi) of the hinterland. Excavations at nearby Thracian sites have shown uninterrupted occupation from the 7th to the 4th century BC and close commercial relations with the colony. The Greek alphabet has been used for inscriptions in Thracian since at least the 5th century BC.

Odessos was included in the assessment of the Delian League of 425 BC. In 339 BC, it was unsuccessfully besieged by Philip II (priests of the Getae persuaded him to conclude a treaty) but surrendered to Alexander the Great in 335 BC, and was later ruled by his diadochus Lysimachus, against whom it rebelled in 313 BC as part of a coalition with other Pontic cities and the Getae. Nevertheless, at the end of the 4th century BC, the city became one of the strongholds of Lysimachus. The city became very prosperous from this time due to strong sea trade with many of the Mediterranean states and cities, supported by a wide range of local products. Shortly after 108 BC, Odessos recognised the suzerainty of Mithridates VI of Pontus.

The Roman city, Odessus, first included into the Praefectura orae maritimae and then in 15 AD annexed to the province of Moesia (later Moesia Inferior), covered 47 hectares in present-day central Varna and had prominent public baths, Thermae, erected in the late 2nd century AD (so-called Large (North) Ancient Roman Thermae), now the largest Roman remains in Bulgaria (the building was 100 m (328.08 ft) wide, 70 m (229.66 ft) long, and 25 m (82.02 ft) high) and fourth-largest-known Roman baths in Europe which testify to the importance of the city. There is also the Small (South) Ancient Roman Thermae from the 5th–6th century AD. Additionally, in 2019, archaeologists discovered ruins of a Roman thermae building from the 5th century AD.

Major athletic games were held every five years, possibly attended by Gordian III in 238.

The main aqueduct of Odessos was recently discovered during rescue excavations north of the defensive wall. The aqueduct was built in three construction periods between the 4th and the 6th centuries; in the 4th century, the aqueduct was constructed together with the city wall, then at the end of the 4th to early 5th centuries when a pipeline was laid inside the initial masonry aqueduct. Thirdly, in the 6th century, an additional pipeline was added parallel to the original west of it and entered the city through a reconstruction of the fortress wall. The city minted coins, both as an autonomous polis and under the Roman Empire from Trajan to Salonina, the wife of Gallienus, some of which survive.

Odessos was an early Christian centre, as testified by ruins of twelve early basilicas, a monophysite monastery, and indications that one of the Seventy Disciples, Ampliatus, a follower of Saint Andrew (who, according to the Bulgarian Orthodox Church legend, preached in the city in 56 AD), served as bishop there. In 6th-century imperial documents, it was referred to as "holiest city," sacratissima civitas. In 442, a peace treaty was signed between Theodosius II and Attila at Odessos. Furthermore, in 513, the city became a focal point of the Vitalian revolt. Additionally, in 536, Emperor Justinian I designated it as the seat of the Quaestura exercitus province ruled by a prefect of Scythia or quaestor Justinianus and including Lower Moesia, Scythia, Caria, the Aegean Islands, and Cyprus; later, the military camp outside Odessos was the seat of another senior Roman commander, magister militum per Thracias.

=== Bulgarian conquest ===
It has been suggested that the 681 AD peace treaty with the Byzantine Empire that established the new Bulgarian state was concluded at Varna and the first Bulgarian capital south of the Danube may have been provisionally located in its vicinity—possibly in an ancient city near Lake Varna's north shore named Theodorias (Θεοδωριάς) by Justinian I—before it moved to Pliska 70 kilometres (43 miles) to the west. Asparukh fortified the Varna river lowland by a rampart against a possible Byzantine landing; the Asparuhov val (Asparukh's Wall) is still standing. Numerous 7th-century Bulgar settlements have been excavated across the city and further west; the Varna lakes north shores, of all regions, were arguably most densely populated by Bulgars. It has been suggested that Asparukh was aware of the importance of the Roman military camp (campus tribunalis) established by Justinian I outside Odessos and considered it (or its remnants) as the legitimate seat of power for both Lower Moesia and Scythia.

=== Middle Ages ===
During the Middle Ages, the control over the city passed from Byzantine to Bulgarian hands several times. In the late 9th and the first half of the 10th century, Varna was the site of a principal scriptorium of the Preslav Literary School at a monastery endowed by Bulgarian ruler Boris I of Bulgaria, who may have also used it as his monastic retreat. The scriptorium may have played a key role in the development of the Cyrillic script by Bulgarian scholars under the guidance of one of Saint Cyril and Methodius' disciples. Karel Škorpil suggested that Boris I may have been interred there. The synthetic culture with Hellenistic Thracian, Roman, as well as eastern—Armenian, Syrian, Persian—traits that developed around Odessos in the 6th century under Justinian I, may have influenced the Pliska-Preslav culture of the First Bulgarian Empire, ostensibly in architecture and plastic decorative arts, but possibly also in literature, including Cyrillic scholarship. In 1201, Kaloyan took over the Varna fortress, then in Byzantine hands, on Holy Saturday using a siege tower, and secured it for the Second Bulgarian Empire.

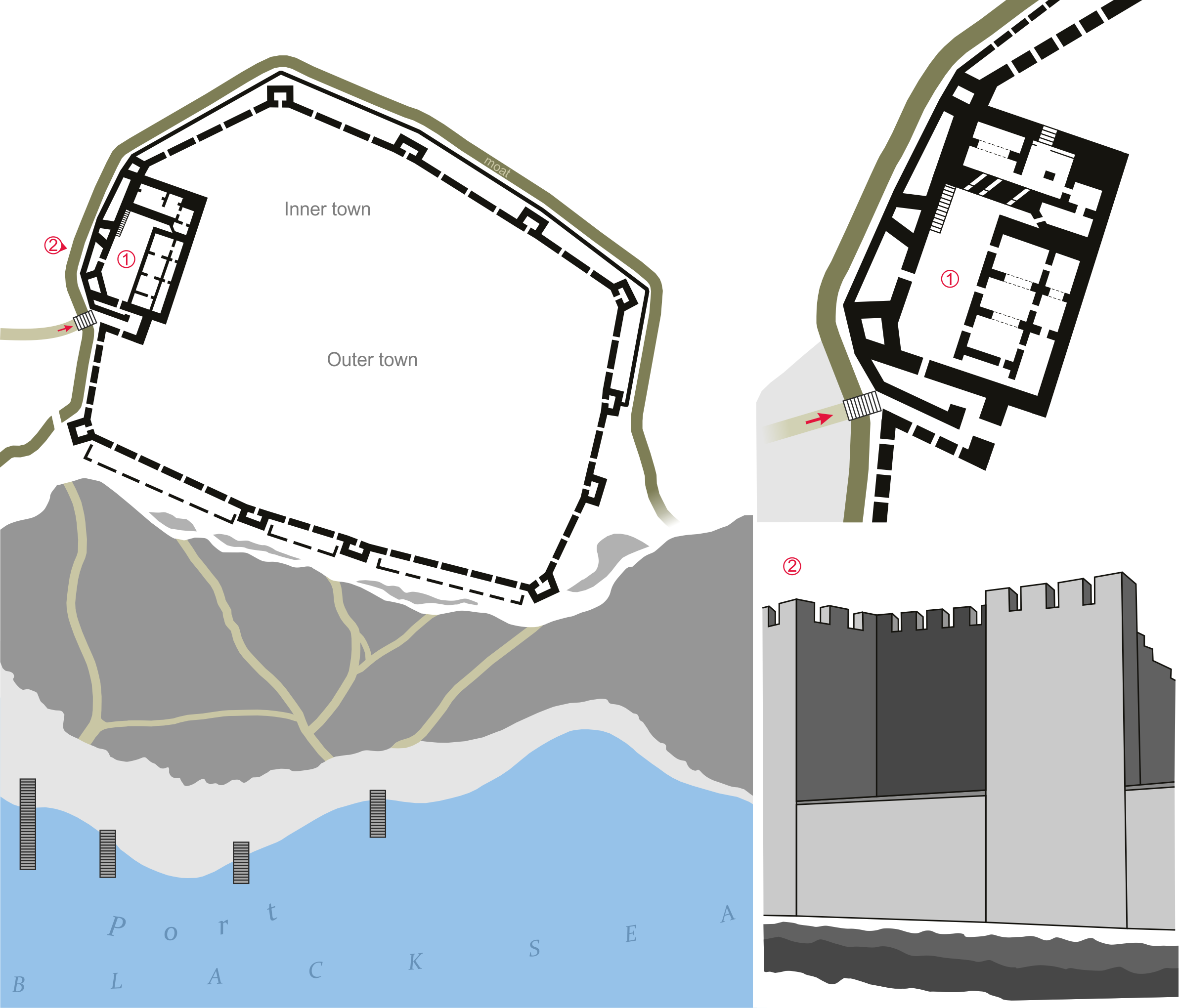
Plan of Varna's medieval fortress.

By the late 13th century, with the 1261' Treaty of Nymphaeum, the offensive-defensive alliance between Michael VIII Palaiologos and Genoa was established, which opened up the Black Sea to Genoese commerce, eventually turning Varna into a thriving commercial port city frequented by Genoese and later also by Venetian and Ragusan merchant ships. The first two maritime republics established their consulates, alongside their expatriate colonies in Varna (Ragusan merchants remained active at the port through the 17th century operating from their colony in nearby Provadia). The city was flanked by two fortresses with smaller commercial ports of their own, Kastritsi and Galata, within sight of each other, and was protected by two other strongholds overlooking the lakes, Maglizh and Petrich. Wheat, animal skins, honey, wax, wine, timber, and other local agricultural produce for the Italian and Constantinople markets were the chief exports, and Mediterranean foods and luxury items were imported. The city introduced its own monetary standard, the Varna perper, by the mid-14th century; the Bulgarian and Venetian currency exchange rate was fixed by a treaty. Fine jewellery, household ceramics, fine leather, and food processing, as well as other crafts, flourished; shipbuilding developed in the Kamchiya river mouth.

Fourteenth-century Italian portolan charts portrayed Varna as arguably the most important seaport between Constantinople and the Danube delta; they usually labeled the region Zagora. The city was unsuccessfully besieged by Amadeus VI, Count of Savoy, who had captured all Bulgarian fortresses to the south of it, including Galata, in 1366. In 1386, Varna briefly became the capital of the spinoff Despotate of Dobruja, then was conquered by the Ottoman Turks in 1389 (and again in 1444), ceded temporarily to Manuel II Palaeologus in 1413 (perhaps until 1444), and was sacked by Tatars in 1414.

=== Battle of Varna ===
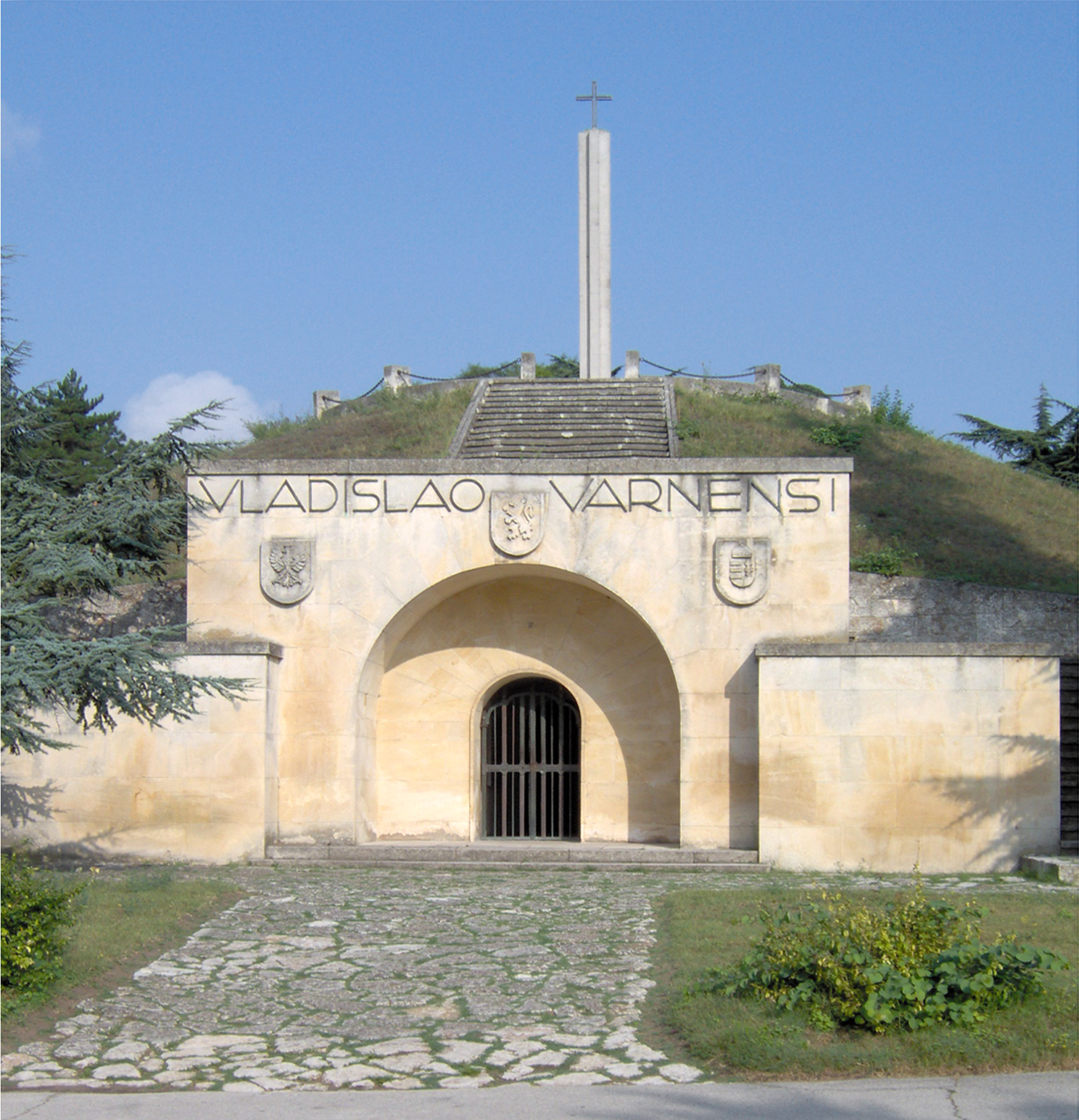
Memorial of the Battle of Varna of 1444 carved into an ancient Thracian burial mound

On 10 November 1444, one of the last major battles of the Crusades in European history was fought outside the city walls. The Ottomans routed an army of 20,000–30,000 crusaders, commanded by Władysław III of Poland, also Ulászló I of Hungary and John Hunyadi, which had assembled at the port to set sail for Constantinople. The Christian army was attacked by a superior force of 55,000 or 60,000 Ottomans led by Sultan Murad II. Ladislaus III was killed in a bold attempt to capture the sultan, earning the sobriquet Warneńczyk (of Varna in Polish; he is also known as Várnai Ulászló in Hungarian or Ladislaus Varnensis in Latin). The failure of the Crusade of Varna made the fall of Constantinople to the Ottomans in 1453 all but inevitable, and Varna (with all of Bulgaria) was to remain under Ottoman domination for over four centuries. Today, there is a cenotaph of Ladislaus III in Varna.

=== Late Ottoman rule ===
A major port, agricultural, trade, and shipbuilding centre for the Ottoman Empire in the 16th and 17th centuries, preserving a significant and economically active Bulgarian population, Varna was later made one of the Quadrilateral Fortresses (along with Rousse, Shumen, and Silistra), severing Dobruja from the rest of Bulgaria and containing Russia in the Russo-Turkish wars. The Russians stormed the city in 1773 and besieged it in 1828; however, both ended in failure.

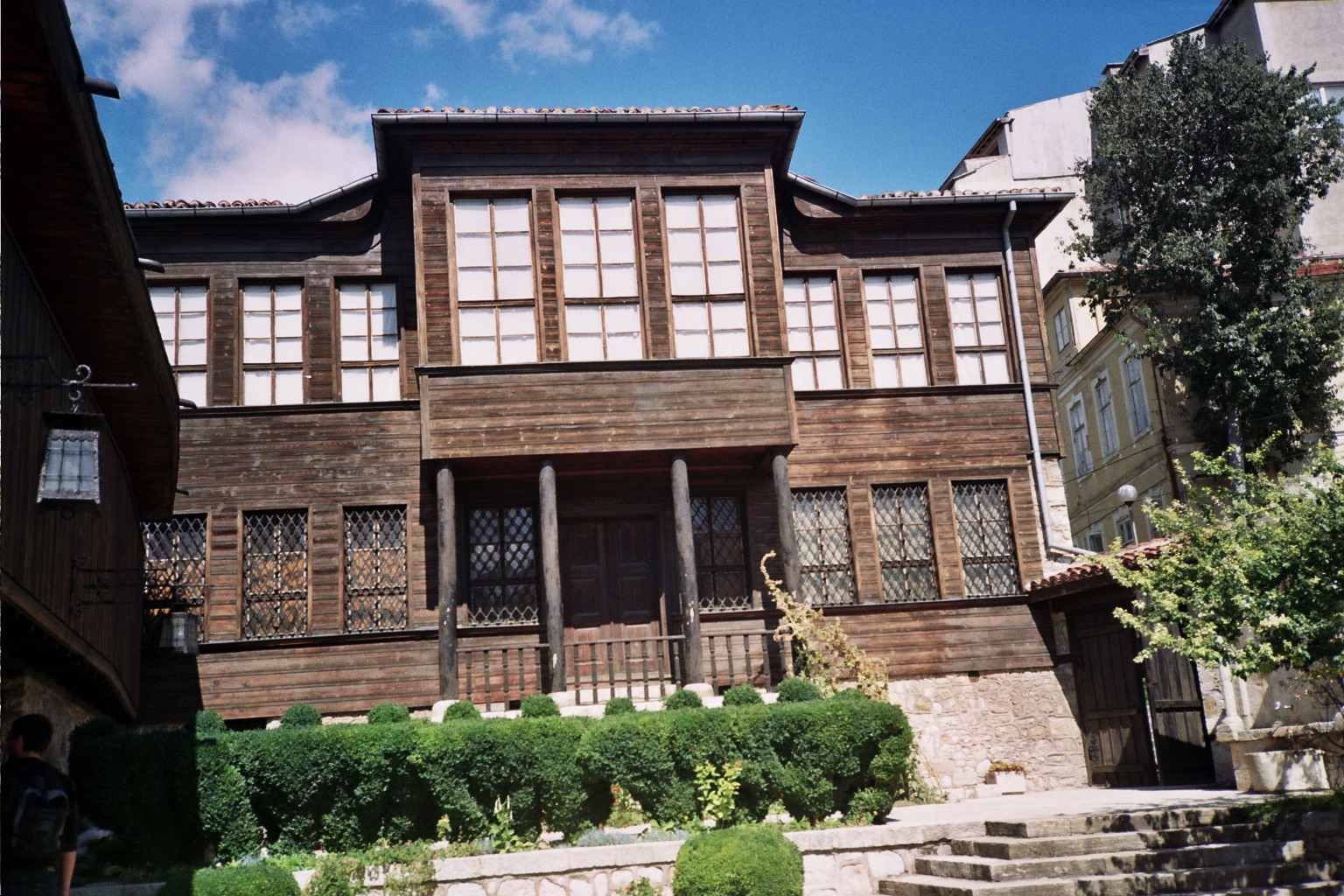
Ottoman period townhouse

In the early 19th century, many local Greeks joined the patriotic organisation Filiki Eteria. At the outbreak of the Greek War of Independence (1821), revolutionary activity was recorded in Varna. As a result, local notables who participated in the Greek national movement were executed by the Ottoman authorities, while others managed to escape to Greece, where they continued their struggle for independence.

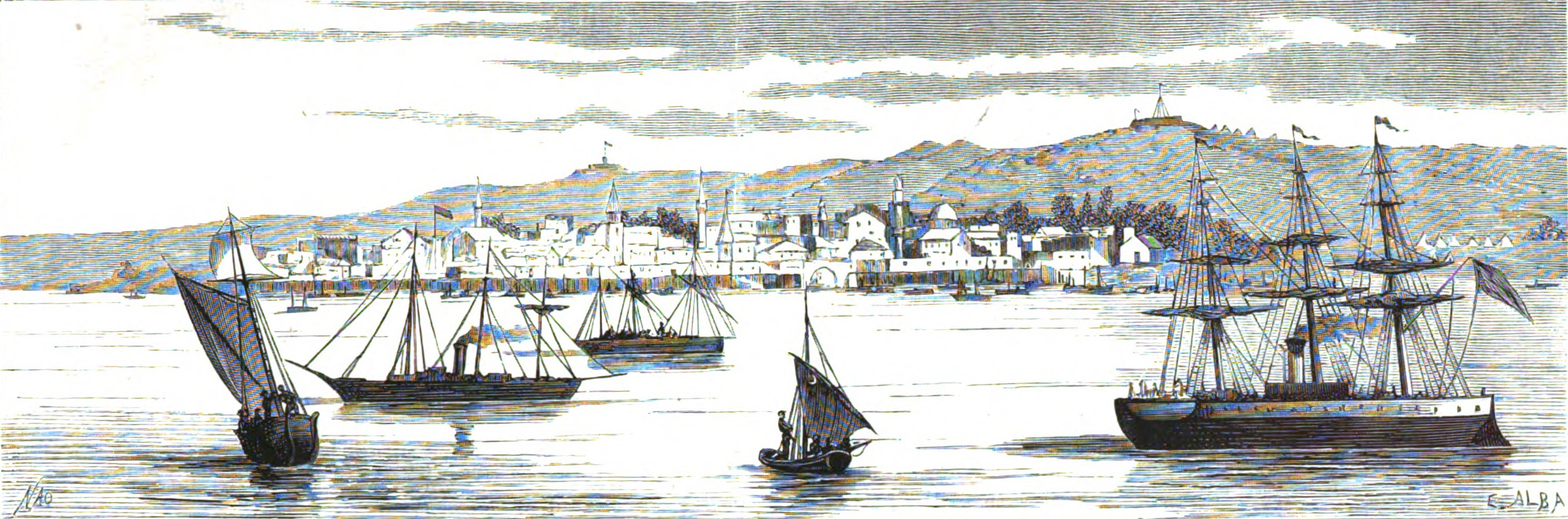
Varna during the late Ottoman rule

The British and French, campaigning against Russia in the Crimean War (1854–1856), used Varna as headquarters and principal naval base; many soldiers died of cholera, and the city was devastated by a fire. A British and a French monument mark the cemeteries where cholera victims were interred. In 1866, the first railroad in Bulgaria established a connection between Varna and Rousse on the Danube, linking the Ottoman capital Constantinople with Central Europe; for a few years, the Orient Express ran through that route. The port of Varna developed as a major supplier of food—notably wheat from the adjacent breadbasket Southern Dobruja—to Constantinople and a busy hub for European imports to the capital; 12 foreign consulates opened in the city. Local Bulgarians took part in the National Revival; Vasil Levski established a secret revolutionary committee.

=== Third Bulgarian State ===
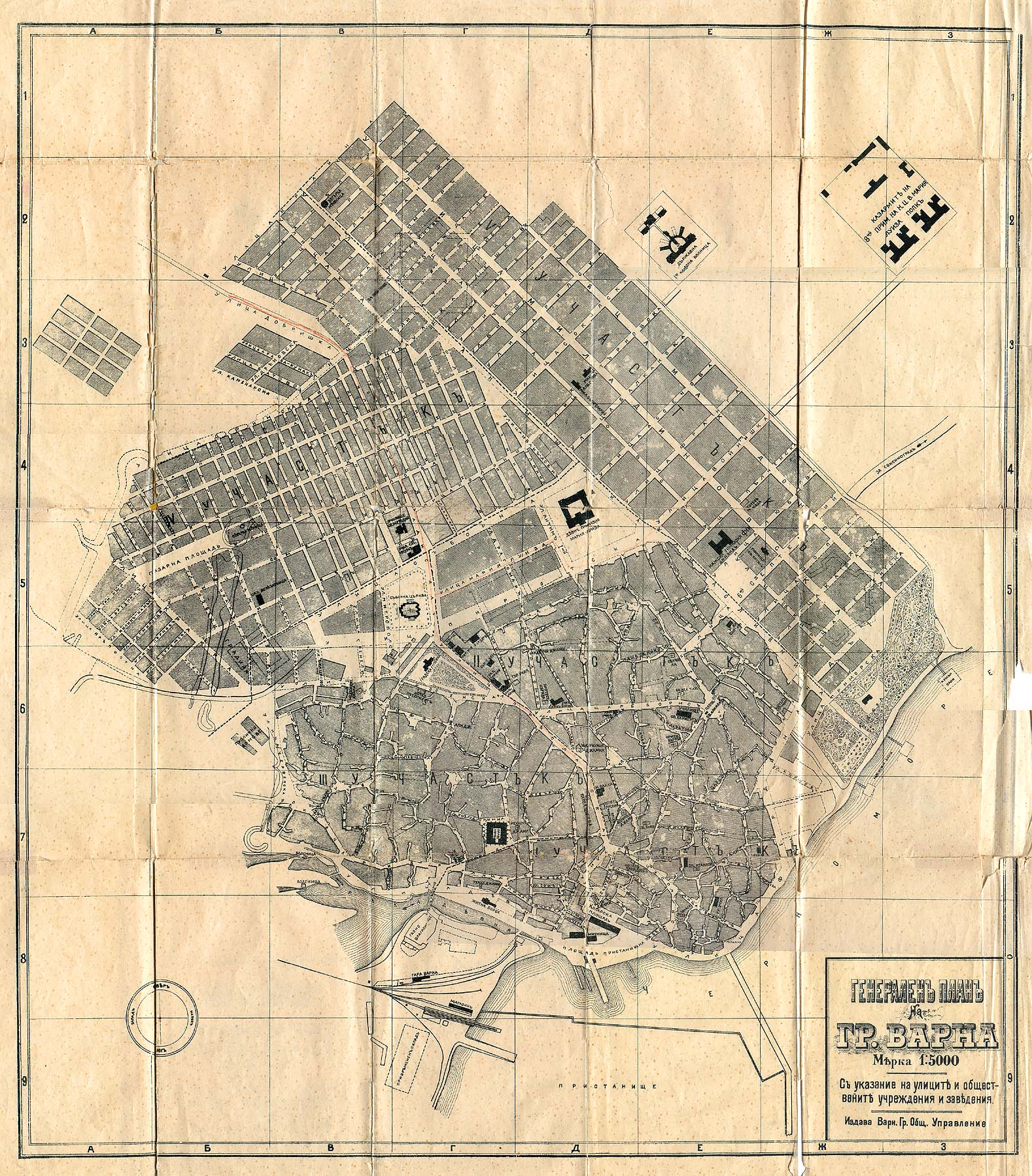
City map of 1897

In 1878, the city, which had 26,000 inhabitants, was ceded to Bulgaria by Russian troops, who entered on 27 July. Varna became a front city during the First Balkan War and World War I; its economy was significantly hampered by the temporary loss of its agrarian hinterland of Southern Dobruja to Romania (1913–1916 and 1919–1940). During World War II, the Red Army troops occupied the city in September 1944 and, afterward, helped to cement communist rule in Bulgaria, then known as the People's Republic of Bulgaria.

One of the early centres of industrial development and the Bulgarian labour movement, Varna established itself as the nation's principal port of export, a major grain-producing and viticulture centre, seat of the nation's oldest institution of higher learning outside Sofia, a popular venue for international festivals and events, and the country's de facto summer capital with the erection of the Euxinograd royal summer palace (currently, the Bulgarian government convenes summer sessions there). Mass tourism emerged since the late 1950s. Heavy industry and trade with the Soviet Union boomed from the 1950s to the 1970s.

From 20 December 1949 to 20 October 1956, the city was renamed Stalin by the communist government after Soviet dictator Joseph Stalin.

In 1962, the 15th Chess Olympiad, also known as the World Team Championship, organized by FIDE, was held in Varna. In 1969 and 1987, Varna was the host of the World Rhythmic Gymnastics Championships. From 30 September to 4 October 1973, the 10th Olympic Congress took place in the Palace of Culture and Sports.

Varna became a popular resort for Eastern Europeans, who were barred from traveling to the West until 1989. One of them, the veteran East German communist Otto Braun, died on vacation in Varna in 1974.

== Geography ==
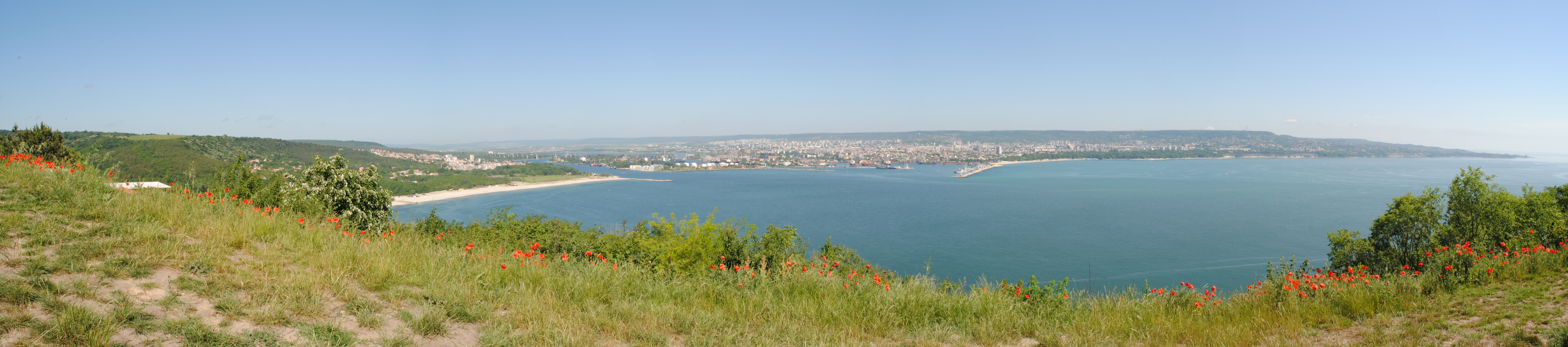
Varna Bay

The city occupies 238 km^{2} (92 sq mi) on verdant terraces (Varna monocline of the Moesian Platform) descending from the calcareous Franga Plateau (height 356 m or 1,168 ft) on the north and Avren Plateau on the south, along the horseshoe-shaped Varna Bay of the Black Sea, the elongated Lake Varna, and two artificial waterways connecting the bay and the lake and bridged by the Asparuhov most. It is the centre of a growing conurbation stretching along the seaboard 20 km (12 mi) north and 10 km (6 mi) south (mostly residential and recreational sprawl) and along the lake 25 km (16 mi) west (mostly transportation and industrial facilities). Since antiquity, the city has been surrounded by vineyards, orchards, and forests. Commercial shipping facilities are being relocated inland into the lakes and canals, while the bay remains a recreation area; almost all the waterfront is parkland.

The urban area has in excess of 20 km of sand beaches and abounds in thermal mineral water sources (temperature 35–55 °C or 95–131 °F). It enjoys a mild climate influenced by the sea with long, mild, Mediterranean-like, autumns, and sunny and hot, yet considerably cooler than Mediterranean summers moderated by breezes and regular rainfall. Although Varna receives about two-thirds of the average rainfall for Bulgaria, abundant groundwater keeps its wooded hills lush throughout summer. The city is cut off from north and northeast winds by hills along the north arm of the bay, yet January and February can still be bitterly cold at times, with blizzards. Black Sea water has become cleaner after 1989 due to decreased chemical fertilizers in farming; it has low salinity, lacks large predators or poisonous species, and the tidal range is virtually imperceptible.

The city lies 470 km (292 mi) north-east of Sofia; the nearest major cities are Dobrich (45 km or 28 mi to the north), Shumen (80 km or 50 mi to the west), and Burgas (125 km or 78 mi to the south-west).

=== Climate ===
Varna has a humid subtropical climate (Köppen climate classification Cfa). The specific Black Sea climate is milder than the inland parts of the country, and the sea influence lowers the effect of the occasional cold air masses from the north-east. Average precipitation is the lowest for the country, and sunshine is abundant. The summer begins in early May and lasts till early October. Temperatures in summer usually vary from 27 to 30 °C (81 to 86 °F) during the day and from 17 to 18 °C (63 to 64 °F) at the night. Seawater temperature during the summer months is usually in the range 24–27 °C (75–81 °F). In winter, temperatures are about 6–7 °C (43–45 °F) during the day and 0 °C (32 °F) at night. Snow is possible in the coldest months, but it can quickly melt. The highest temperature ever recorded was 41.4 °C (106.5 °F) in July 1927, and the lowest was −24.3 °C (−11.7 °F) in February 1929.

Climate data for Varna (normals for 1991–2020 extremes 1961–2020)
Month	Jan	Feb	Mar	Apr	May	Jun	Jul	Aug	Sep	Oct	Nov	Dec	Year
Record high °C (°F)	21.2 (70.2)	22.6 (72.7)	29.5 (85.1)	30.7 (87.3)	35.6 (96.1)	36.8 (98.2)	40.0 (104.0)	40.0 (104.0)	37.2 (99.0)	32.1 (89.8)	27.0 (80.6)	24.5 (76.1)	40.0 (104.0)
Mean daily maximum °C (°F)	6.6 (43.9)	8.1 (46.6)	11.2 (52.2)	15.5 (59.9)	21.2 (70.2)	26.1 (79.0)	28.9 (84.0)	29.4 (84.9)	24.8 (76.6)	19.0 (66.2)	13.2 (55.8)	8.2 (46.8)	17.7 (63.8)
Daily mean °C (°F)	2.7 (36.9)	3.6 (38.5)	6.5 (43.7)	10.7 (51.3)	16.2 (61.2)	21.0 (69.8)	23.3 (73.9)	23.5 (74.3)	19.1 (66.4)	14.0 (57.2)	9.1 (48.4)	4.3 (39.7)	12.8 (55.1)
Mean daily minimum °C (°F)	−0.5 (31.1)	0.3 (32.5)	3.1 (37.6)	7.2 (45.0)	12.3 (54.1)	16.7 (62.1)	18.9 (66.0)	19.2 (66.6)	15.2 (59.4)	10.5 (50.9)	5.9 (42.6)	1.3 (34.3)	9.2 (48.5)
Record low °C (°F)	−17.8 (0.0)	−16.0 (3.2)	−13.5 (7.7)	−1.6 (29.1)	2.5 (36.5)	7.8 (46.0)	10.2 (50.4)	9.4 (48.9)	3.5 (38.3)	−3.0 (26.6)	−9.6 (14.7)	−12.7 (9.1)	−17.8 (0.0)
Average precipitation mm (inches)	45 (1.8)	33 (1.3)	32 (1.3)	38 (1.5)	38 (1.5)	52 (2.0)	48 (1.9)	29 (1.1)	49 (1.9)	56 (2.2)	49 (1.9)	47 (1.9)	516 (20.3)
Average precipitation days (≥ 1.0 mm)	6	5	6	6	7	6	5	3	5	6	6	6	67
Average relative humidity (%)	82	81	79	77	77	74	72	70	73	75	78	80	77
Average afternoon relative humidity (%)	76	74	72	67	72	66	62	60	61	65	71	75	68
Mean monthly sunshine hours	99	119	154	204	259	278	318	318	236	163	105	92	2,345
Source 1: NOAA NCEI(extremes 1991–2020)
Source 2: Deutscher Wetterdinest(Humidity-extremes 1961-1990, afternoon humidity 1951-1980) (Note: Afternoon humidity measured at 14:00 local time)

Climate data for Varna
Month	Jan	Feb	Mar	Apr	May	Jun	Jul	Aug	Sep	Oct	Nov	Dec	Year
Average sea temperature °C (°F)	8.0 (46.4)	7.3 (45.1)	7.7 (45.9)	9.7 (49.5)	15.8 (60.4)	21.5 (70.7)	24.5 (76.1)	24.8 (76.6)	22.7 (72.9)	17.8 (64.0)	13.2 (55.8)	9.9 (49.8)	15.2 (59.4)
Mean daily daylight hours	9.0	11.0	12.0	13.0	15.0	15.0	15.0	14.0	12.0	11.0	10.0	9.0	12.2
Average ultraviolet index	1	2	3	5	7	8	9	7	5	3	2	1	4.4
Source: Weather Atlas

== Governance ==
Varna is the administrative centre for Varna county (област, oblast, area). On the other hand, Varna municipality (община, obshtina, borough) comprises the city and five suburbs: Kamenar, Kazashko, Konstantinovo, Topoli, and Zvezditsa, served by the city public transport system.

=== Local government ===
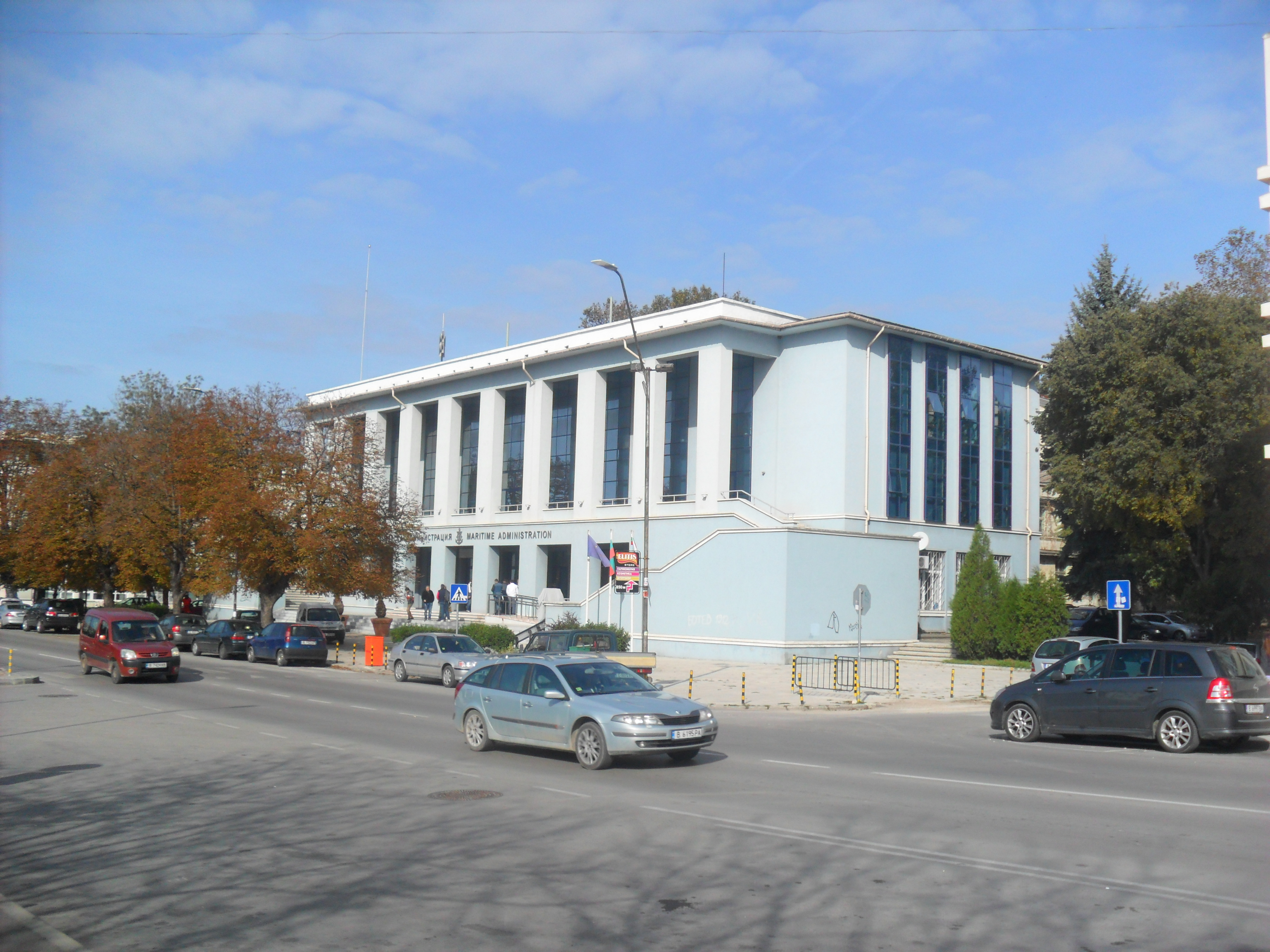
Marine Administration Varna

The municipal chief executive is the Mayor (кмет, kmet: the word is cognate with count). Since the end of the de facto one-party communist rule in 1990, there have been four mayors: Voyno Voynov, SDS (Union of Democratic Forces), ad interim, 1990–91; Hristo Kirchev, SDS, 1991–99; Kiril Yordanov, independent, 1999–2013; Ivan Portnih, GERB, 2013–2023; Blagomir Kotsev, PP–DB, 2023–present.

The City council (общински съвет, obshtinski savet, the 51-member legislature) is the city's legislative body composed of 51 members. As of January 2015 it consists of: centre-right Citizens for European Development of Bulgaria (GERB), 22 council members; centre-right/right-wing Reformist Bloc Patriotic Front (Bulgaria), 6; centre-left Bulgarian Socialist Party (BSP), 5; "Varna" Coalition including Attack, 4; other smaller parties, groups and independent members, 14. The Council chairman is Todor Balabanov (GERB).

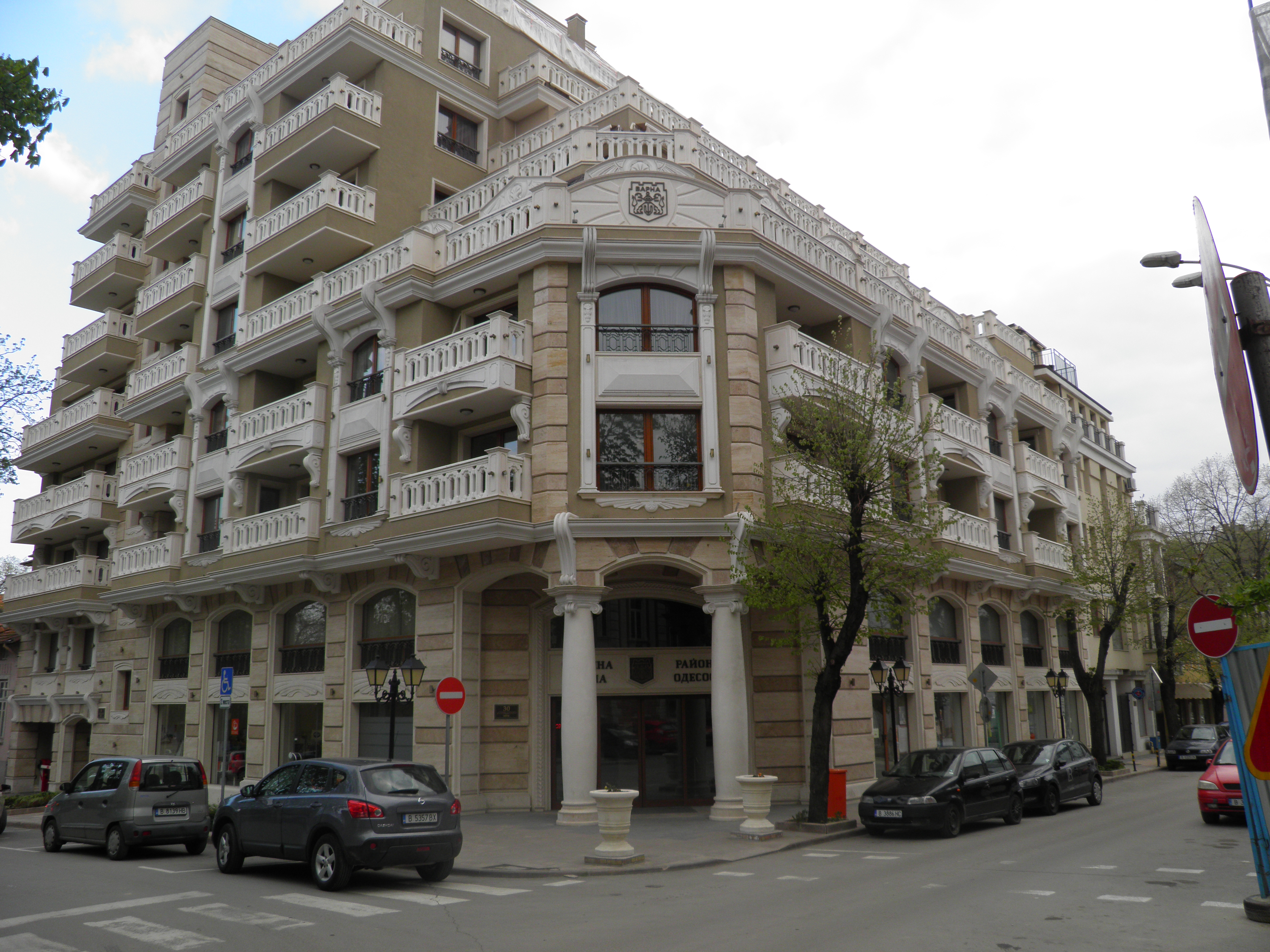
Odessos Area Building

Varna regional court is one of the busiest courts in the country. The city also headquarters the district, administrative, and military court, and a court of appeal as well as regional, military, and appellate prosecutor's offices.

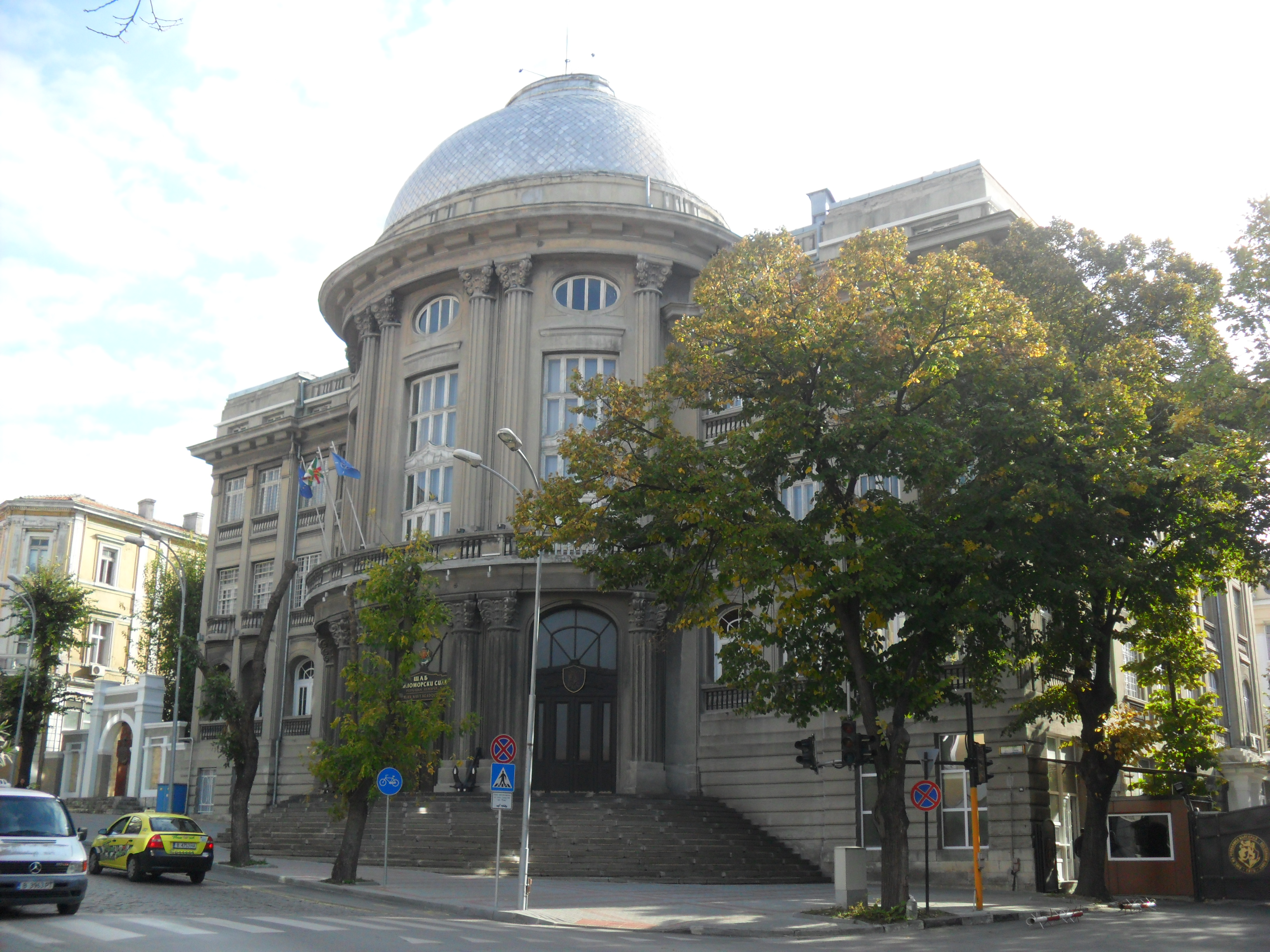
Bulgarian Admiralty in Varna

=== Boroughs and urban planning ===
The city is divided by law into five boroughs (Bulgarian: райони, romanized: rayoni), each with its mayor and council: Asparuhovo, Mladost, Odessos (the historic centre), Primorski (the largest one with official population of 102,000 also comprising the seaside resorts north of the city centre), and Vladislav Varchenchik. The boroughs are composed of various districts with distinctive characters and histories. The villages too have а mayor or a mayoral lieutenant (кметски наместник, kmetski namestnik).

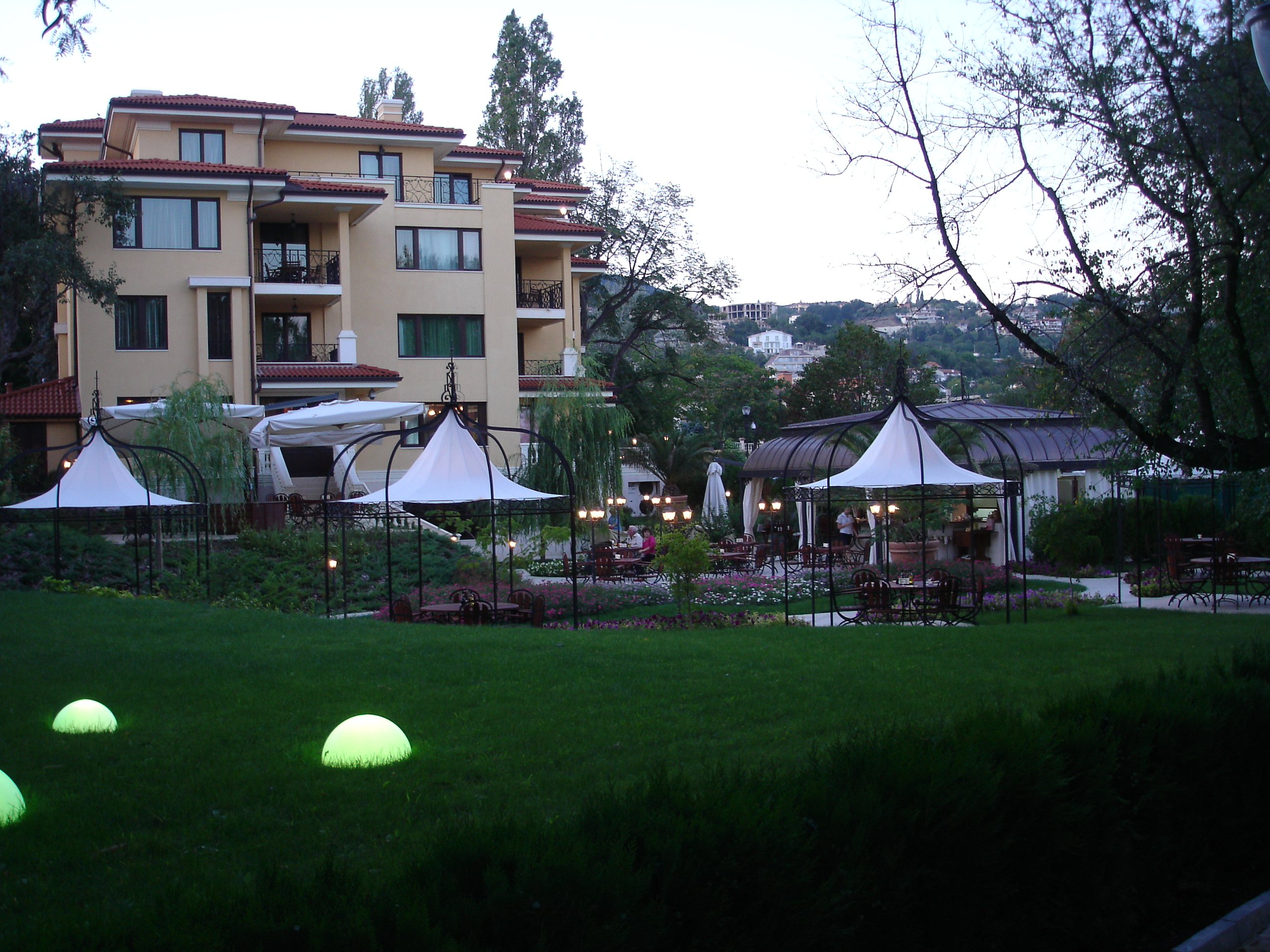
New housing in the Briz district

List of Varna City boroughs and districts

District	Cyrillic	Borough	Population
Vladislav Varnenchik	Владислав Варненчик	Vladislav Varnenchik	48,740
Kaisieva Gradina (Apricot Garden)	Кайсиева градина	Vladislav Varnenchik	48,740
Troshevo	Трошево	Mladost	87,256
Mladost (Youth)	Младост	Mladost	87,256
Chayka (Seagull)	Чайка	Primorski	105,340
Central borough	Център	Odessos	82,784
Asparuhovo	Аспарухово	Asparuhovo	27,178
Vinitza	Виница	Primorski	105,340
Zlatni pyasatsi (Golden Sands)	Златни пясъци	Primorski	105,340
Hristo Botev	Христо Ботев	Odessos	82,784
Galata	Галата	Asparuhovo	27,178
Vazrazhdane (Revival)	Възраждане	Mladost	87,256
Pobeda (Victory)	Победа	Mladost	87,256
Zapadna Promishlena Zona (West Industrial Zone)	Западна промишлена зона	Mladost	87,256

=== Policing and crime ===
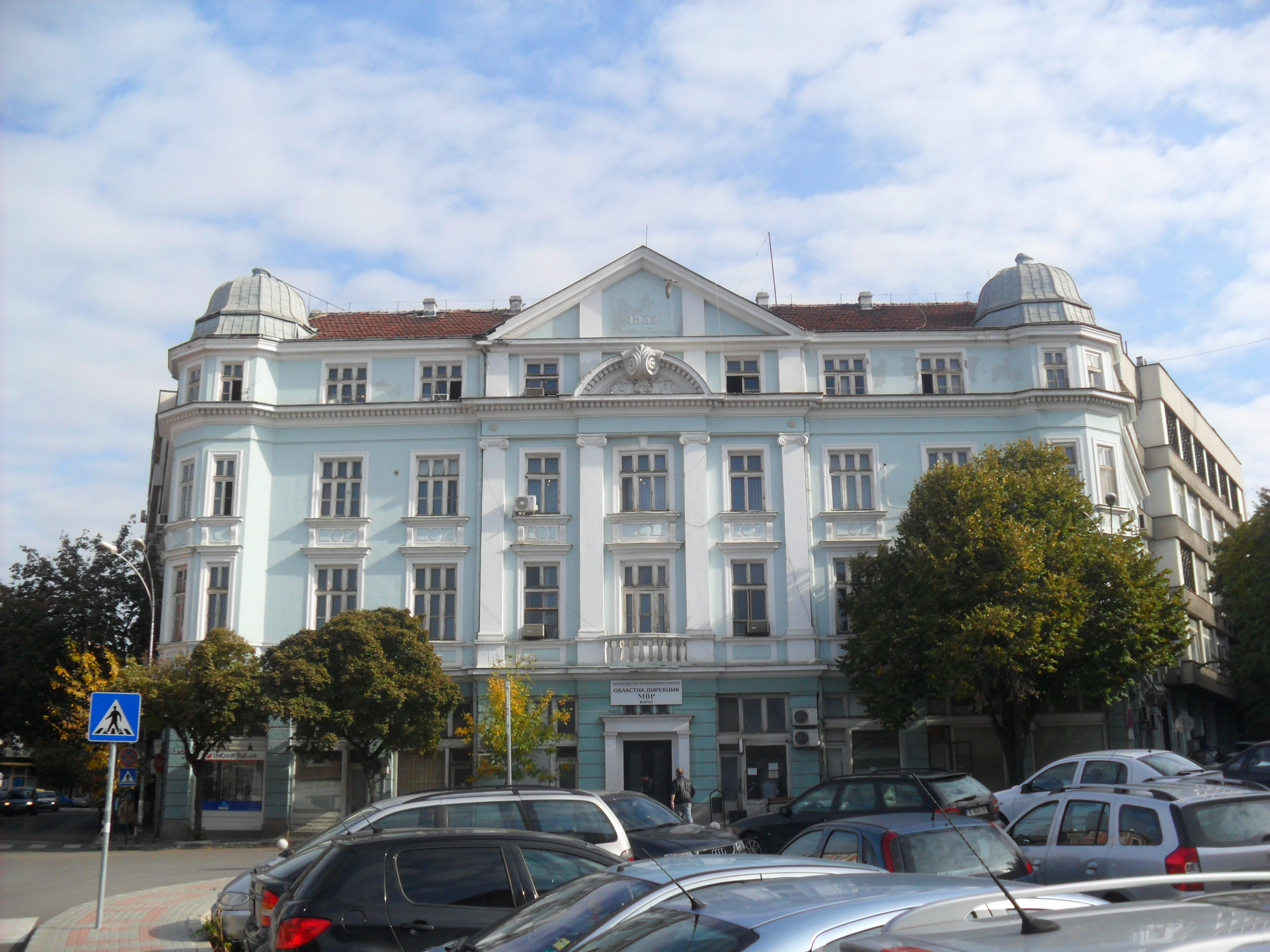
Police regional directorate

Varna was rumoured to be the hub of Bulgarian organised crime. Some sectors of the economy, including gambling, corporate security, tourism, real estate, and professional sports, were believed to be controlled in part by business groups with links to Communist-era secret services or the military.

However, it is noted that in Varna, the so-called mutri (Mafia) presence was by no means as visible as it was in smaller coastal towns and resorts. Over the last couple of years, crime has subsided, which is said to have contributed to Varna being named as Bulgaria's Best City to Live In (2007); in 2007, the regional police chief was promoted to the helm of the national police service.

=== Consulates ===
There are consulates of the following countries: Czech Republic, Denmark, Finland, France, Germany, Hungary, Indonesia, Israel, Italy, Norway, South Africa, Spain, Sweden, Ukraine.

=== Twin towns – sister cities ===
Varna is twinned with:

- Barcelona, Spain
- Bari, Italy
- Bradford, England, United Kingdom
- Cape Town, South Africa
- Dordrecht, Netherlands
- Eimsbüttel (Hamburg), Germany
- Genoa, Italy
- Kavala, Greece
- Kharkiv, Ukraine
- Marseille, France
- Ningbo, China
- Novorossiysk, Russia
- Novosibirsk, Russia
- Rostock, Germany
- Strasbourg, France
- Surabaya, Indonesia
- Turku, Finland
- Urmia, Iran

== Demographics ==
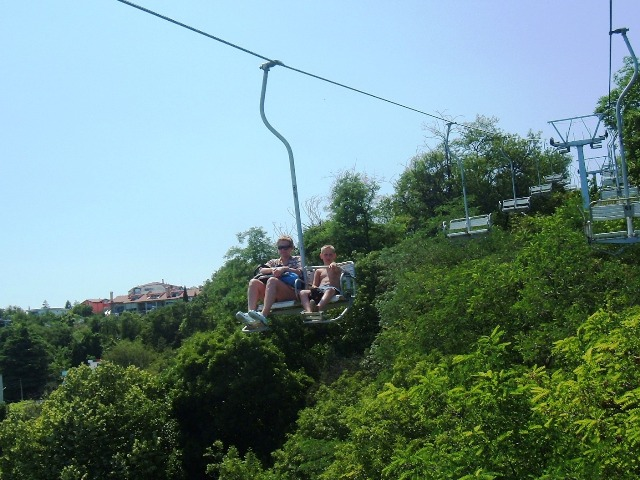
A woman and a boy enjoying Varna's aerial chairlift ride at Chaika beachfront community

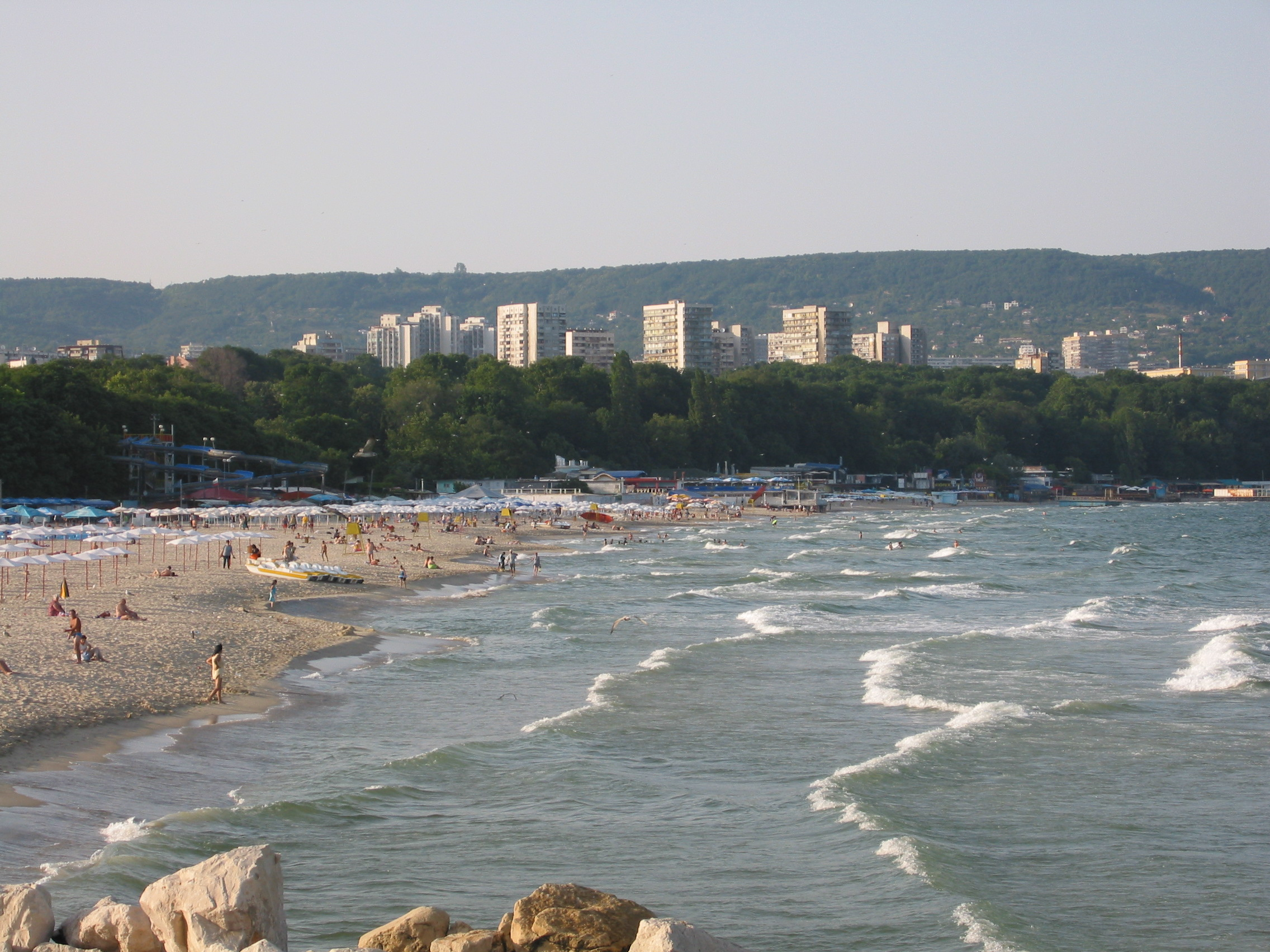
Varna South Beach

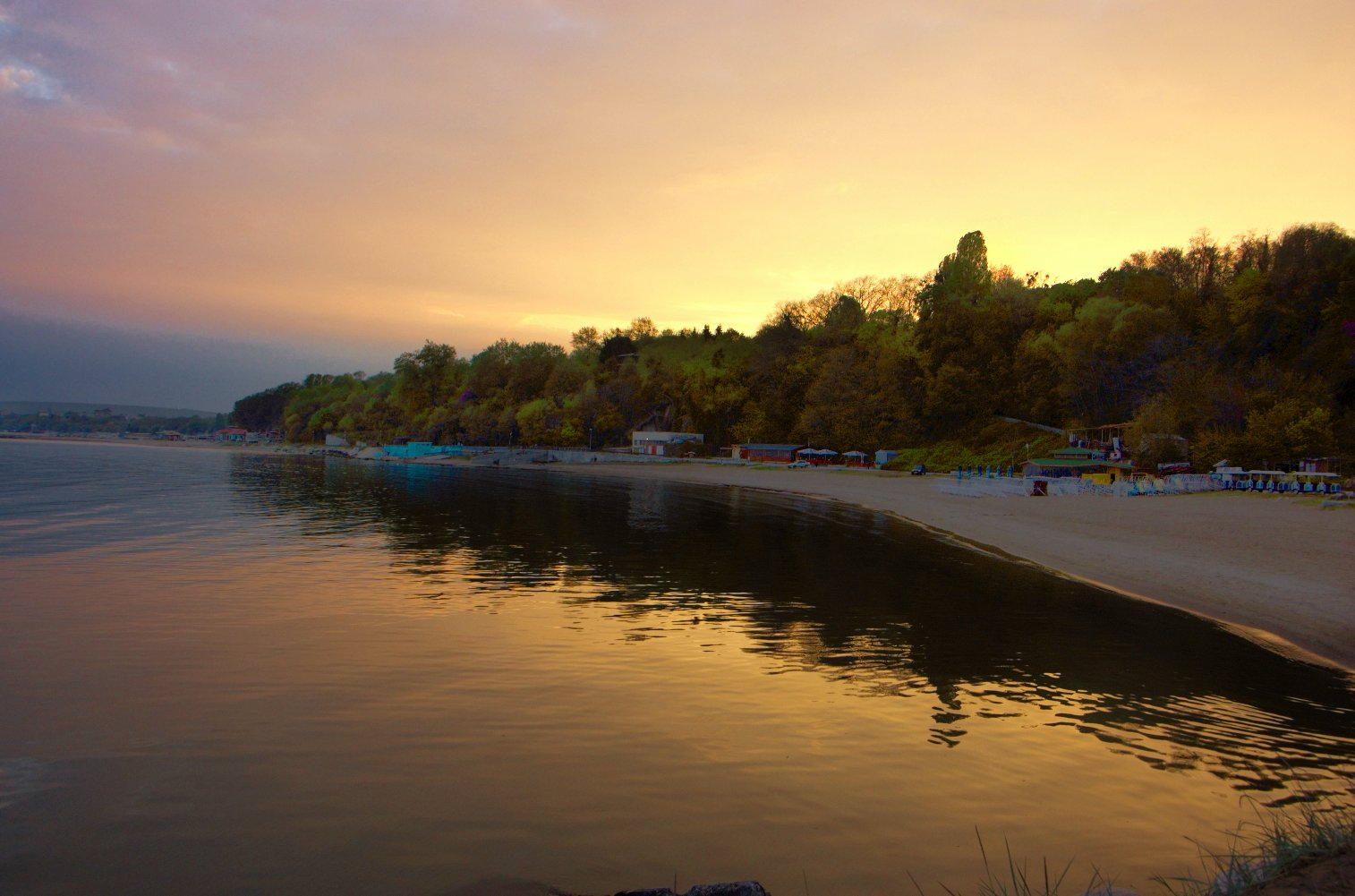
Officers' Beach at sunset

The first population data date back to the mid-17th century when the town was thought to have about 4,000 inhabitants, while the first population census in 1881 counted 24,555. According to the 1883 census, it was the second-largest in Bulgaria after Ruse. Thereafter Varna became Bulgaria's third-largest city and kept this position steadily for the next 120 years, while different cities took turns in the first, second, and fourth places.

Historical population
Year	Pop.	±%
1887	25,256	—
1910	41,419	+64.0%
1934	69,563	+67.9%
1946	76,954	+10.6%
1956	120,345	+56.4%
1965	180,110	+49.7%
1975	252,525	+40.2%
1985	302,211	+19.7%
1992	308,432	+2.1%
2001	312,889	+1.4%
2011	334,870	+7.0%
2021	310,664	−7.2%

In January 2012, the city of Varna has a population of 334,781, which makes it the third-largest city in Bulgaria, while the Varna Municipality along with the legally affiliated adjacent villages had 343,643 inhabitants. The unofficial metro area (including Varna municipality and adjacent parts of Aksakovo, Avren, Beloslav, and Devnya municipalities, and excluding adjacent parts of Dobrich Province) has an estimated population of 475,000. Here, the "Varna-Devnya-Provadiya agglomeration" is not considered identical to the "Varna metro area".

Varna is one of the few cities in Bulgaria with a positive natural growth (6300 births vs. 3600 deaths in 2009) and new children's day care centers opening (6 expected in 2009).

Since December 2006, various sources, including the Bulgarian National Television, national newspapers, research agencies, the mayor's office, and local police, claim that Varna has a population by present address of over 500,000, making it the nation's second-largest city. Official statistics according to GRAO and NSI, however, have not supported their claims. In 2008, Deputy Mayor Venelin Zhechev estimated the actual population at 650,000. In December 2008, Mayor Kiril Yordanov claimed the actual number of permanent residents was 970,000, or that there were 60% unregistered people. In January 2009, the Financial Times said that "Varna now draws about 30,000 new residents a year." The census, carried out in February 2011, enumerated 334,870 inhabitants. If unregistered population plus the commuters from the adjacent municipalities are taken into consideration, the real population of the city during a work day reaches 400,000. Varna attracts 2 to 3 million tourists a year, as the holidaymakers may reach as many as 200,000 daily during the high season. Thus, there are about 600,000 people in the city in July and August.

=== Ethnic, linguistic and religious composition ===
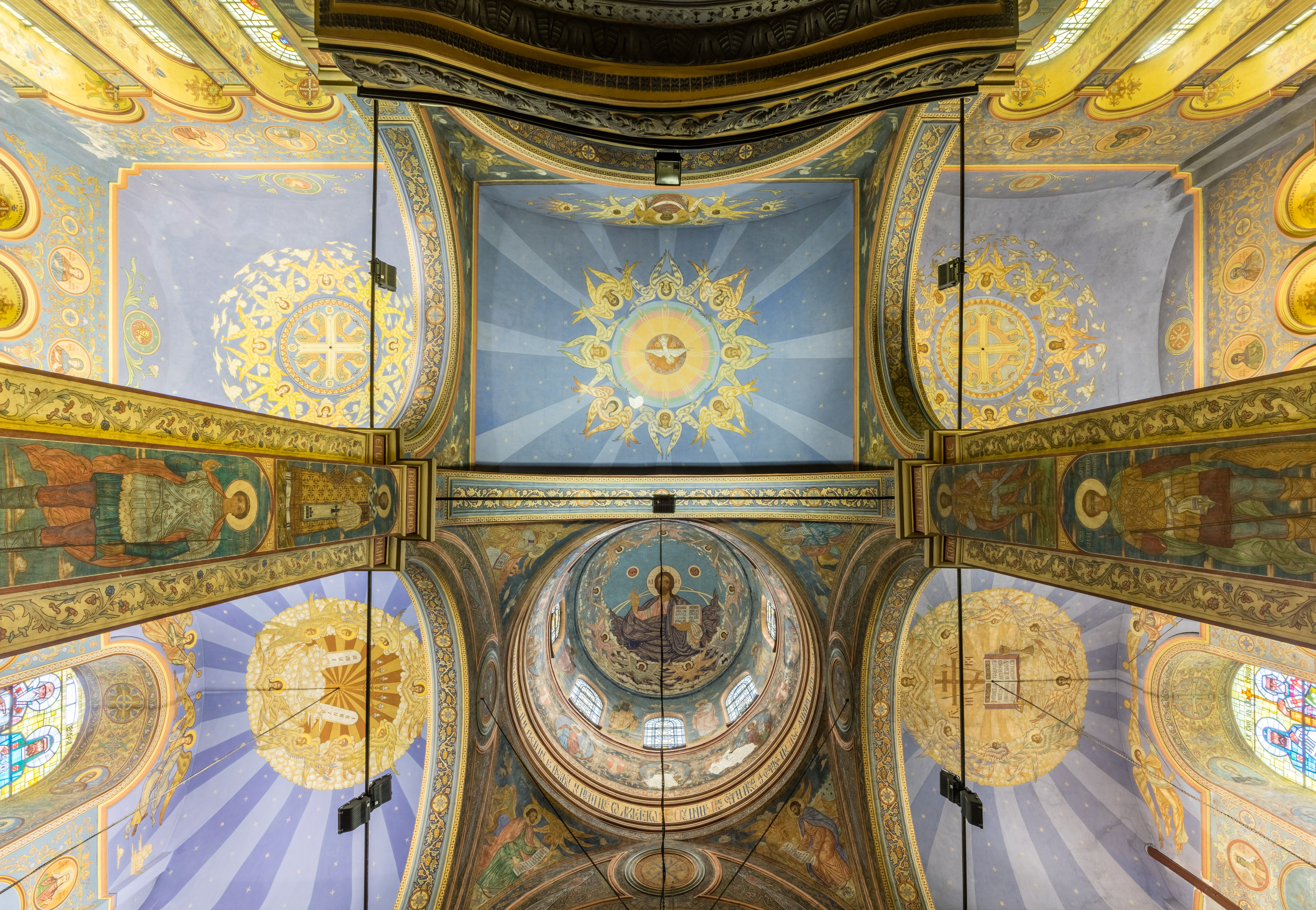
Cathedral dome

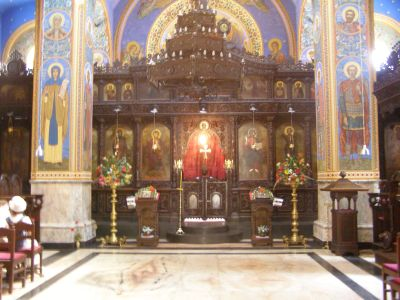
Debar school wood-carved iconostasis

Most Varnians (варненци, varnentsi) are ethnic Bulgarians (94%). Ethnic Turks rank second with 3%; however by 2009, Russians and other Russian-speaking recent immigrants with no Bulgarian citizenship, estimated at over 20,000, perhaps have outnumbered them, additionally there is a growing number of new Asian and African immigrants and corporate expatriates. These are mostly students of the medical university of Varna. There is a comparable number of Romani (1% of the population) mostly in three distinctive and largely impoverished neighbourhoods: Maksuda; Rozova Dolina in the Asparuhovo district; and Chengene Kula in the Vladislavovo district, while Varna is spearheading several programs on Romani integration. Armenians, Greeks, Jews, and other long-standing ethnic groups are also present although in much smaller numbers. With the departure of most Turks and Greeks and the arrival of Bulgarian refugees and settlers from inland, Northern Dobruja, Bessarabia, and Asia Minor, and later, of refugees from Macedonia, Eastern Thrace and Southern Dobruja following the Second Balkan War and the First World War, ethnic diversity gave way to Bulgarian predominance, although sizeable minorities of Gagauz, Armenians, and Sephardic Jews remained for decades.

According to the 1876 census of the Danube Vilayet in the Ottoman Empire, the population of Varna consisted of a majority of Bulgarians (50%) and a minority of Muslims (over 40%). A significant part were Turkish-speaking Christians (Gagauzes) who identified as Bulgarians.

According to the 1881 census in Bulgaria, the Turkish language was a mother tongue for 8903 people (36.25%), for 6721 was the Bulgarian (27.36%), for 5,367 was Greek (21.85%) and Tatar for 837 (3.41%). By ethnic group, ethnic Bulgarians were then 6,714, of whom 4478 men and 2236 women.

According to the latest 2011 census data, the individuals declared their ethnic identity were distributed as follows:

- Bulgarians: 284,738 (93.8%)
- Turks: 10,028 (3.6%)
- Romani: 3,162 (1.0%)
- Others: 3,378 (1.1%)
- Indefinable: 2,288 (0.8%)
  - Undeclared: 31,276 (10.3%)

Total: 334,781

In Varna Municipality 290,780 declared as Bulgarians, 11,089 as Turks, 3,535 as Romani and 34,758 did not declare their ethnic group.

According to the 2001 census data, the ethnic composition was as follows:

- Bulgarians: 296,407 (92.5%)
- Turks: 12,295 (3.8%)
- Romani: 3,748 (1.2%)
- Others: 4,566 (1.4%)
- Indefinable: 2,406 (0.8%)
  - Undeclared: 1,042 (0.3%)

Total: 320,464

== Economy ==
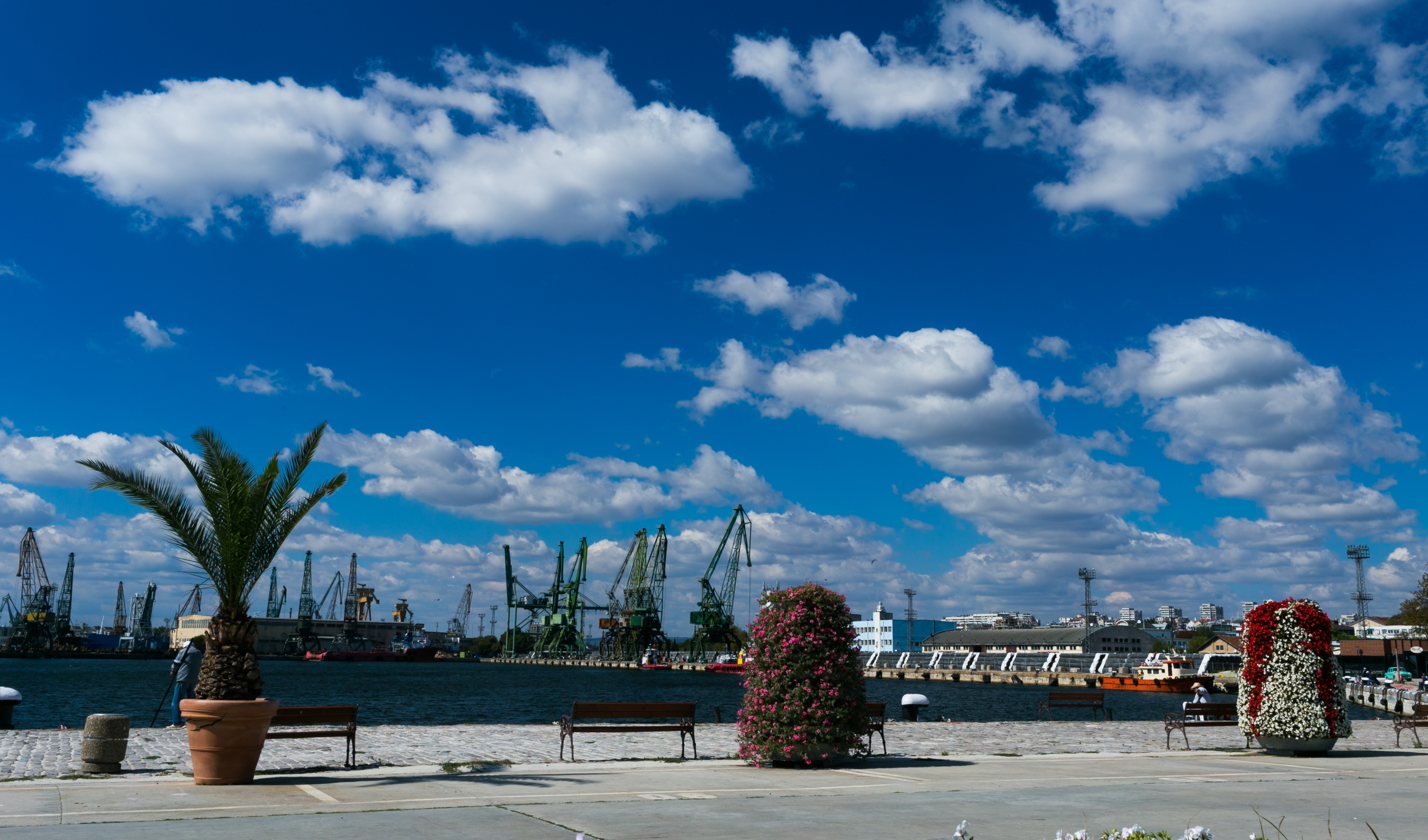
Port Varna

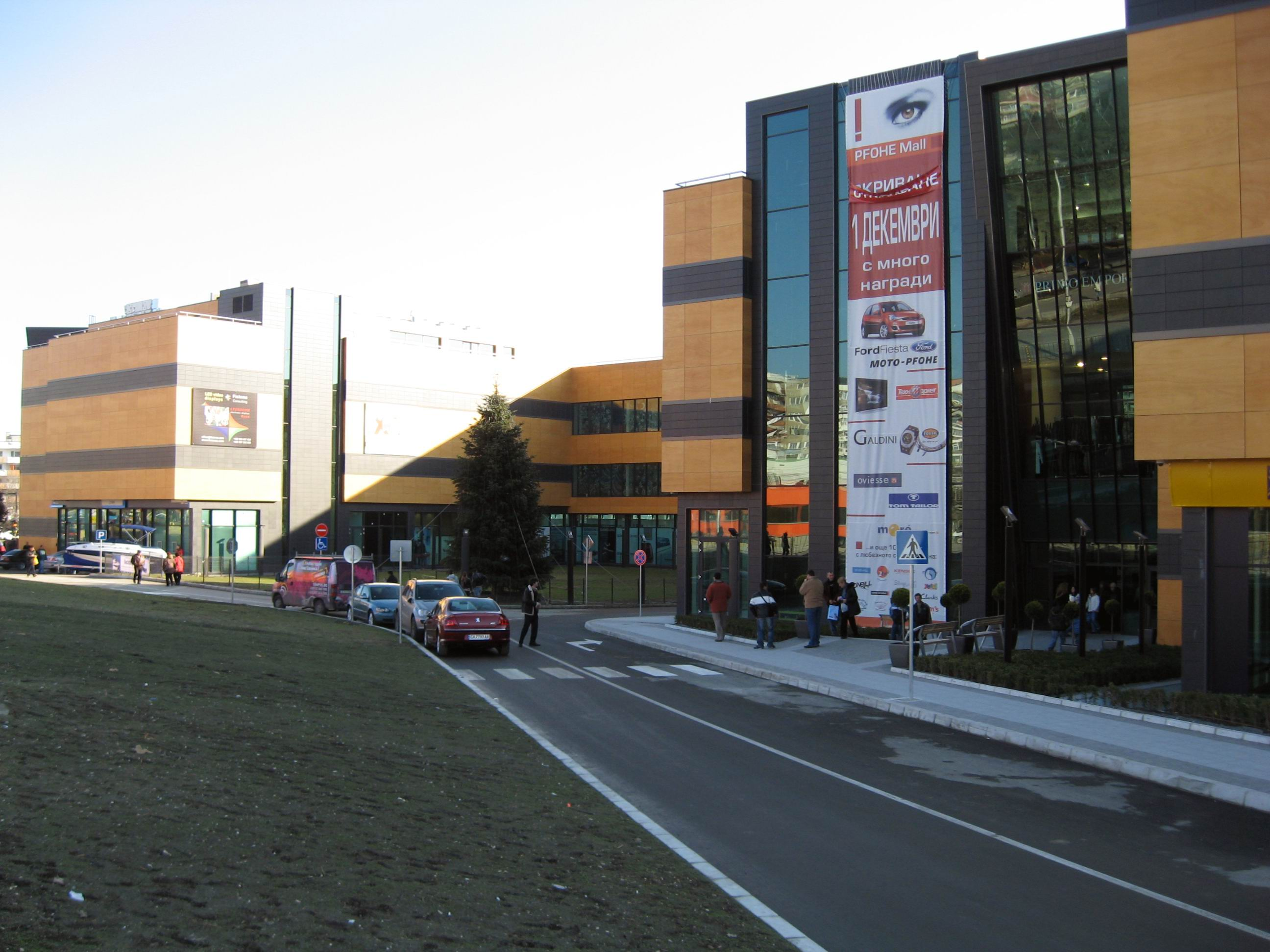
A new "lifestyle" shopping mall in the Troshevo district

Economically, Varna is among the best-performing and fastest-growing Bulgarian cities. In 2016 the unemployment rate is 3.5% and the average salary is nearly 900lv (450€) per month. The economy is service-based, with 61% of net revenue generated in trade and tourism, 16% in manufacturing, 14% in transportation and communications, and 6% in construction. Financial services, particularly banking, insurance, investment management, and real-estate finance are booming. The city is the easternmost destination of Pan-European corridors 8 and is connected to corridors 7 and 9 via Rousse. Major industries traditionally include transportation (Navibulgar, Port of Varna, Varna Airport), distribution (Logistics Park Varna), shipbuilding (see also Oceanic-Creations), ship repair, and other marine industries.

The largest port in Bulgaria is the Port of Varna through which over 7m tonnes of freight moves annually.

In June 2007, Eni and Gazprom disclosed the South Stream project whereby a 900-kilometre-long (559-mile) offshore natural gas pipeline from Russia's Dzhubga with annual capacity of 63 billion metres (207 billion feet) was planned to come ashore at Varna, possibly near the Galata offshore gas field, en route to Italy and Austria. Nevertheless, the project was stopped due to the EU–Russia conflict.

With the nearby towns of Beloslav and Devnya, Varna forms the Varna-Devnya Industrial Complex, home to some of the largest chemical, thermal power, and manufacturing facilities in Bulgaria, including Varna Thermal Power Plant and Sodi Devnya, the two largest cash privatisation deals in the country's recent history. There are also notable facilities for radio navigation devices, household appliances, security systems, textiles, apparel, food and beverages, printing, and other industries. Some manufacturing veterans are giving way to post-industrial developments: an ECE shopping mall is taking the place of the former VAMO diesel engine works and the Varna Brewery is being replaced by a convention centre.

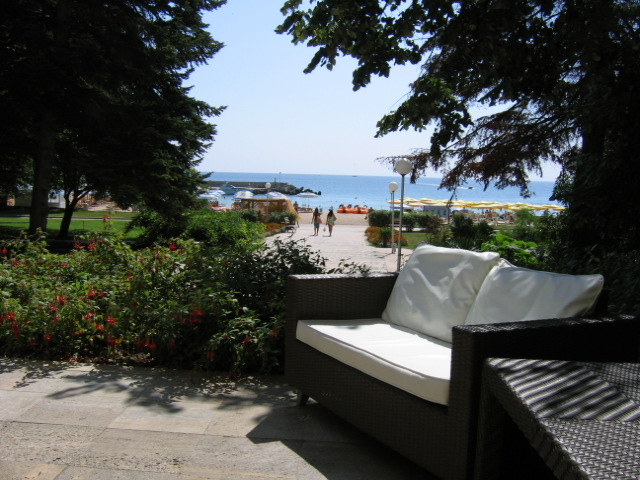
A beach at Golden Sands

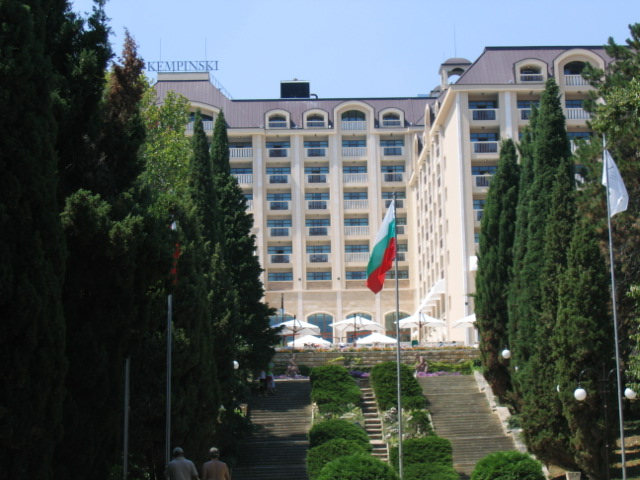
Grand Hotel Hermitage, Golden Sands

Tourism is of foremost importance with the suburban beachfront resorts of Golden Sands, Riviera Holiday Club, Sunny Day, Saints Constantine and Helena attracting around 1 million foreign tourists in 2016. The resorts received considerable internal and foreign investment in the late 1990s and early in the first decade of the 21st century, and are environmentally sound, being located reassuringly far from chemical and other smokestack industries. Varna is also Bulgaria's only international cruise destination with 36 cruises for 2014 and a major international conference and SPA centre. Varna South Bay is also becoming a popular area for tourists

The highest building in the city is Interhotel Cherno More at 72.2 meters.

Real estate boomed in 2003–2008 with some of the highest prices in the country, by fall 2007 surpassing Sofia. In 2017 Varna is second in terms of construction projects.

In retail, the city not only has the assortment of international big-box retailers, now found in larger Bulgarian cities, but boasts made-in-Varna national chains with locations spreading over the country such as retailer Piccadilly, the famous restaurant chain Happy and pharmacy chain Sanita. Mall Varna, Grand Mall and Delta Planet Mall are the three largest shopping centres in Varna, turning the city into an attractive shopping destination. The city has many of the finest eateries in the nation and abounds in ethnic food places. There is a plethora of Internet cafes and many places, including parks, are covered by free public wireless internet service. Varna is connected to other Black Sea cities by the submarine Black Sea Fibre Optic Cable System.

In 2016 Varna won the vote of Darik Radio listeners and was awarded "Best city to live" and "Protector of History".

== Transport ==
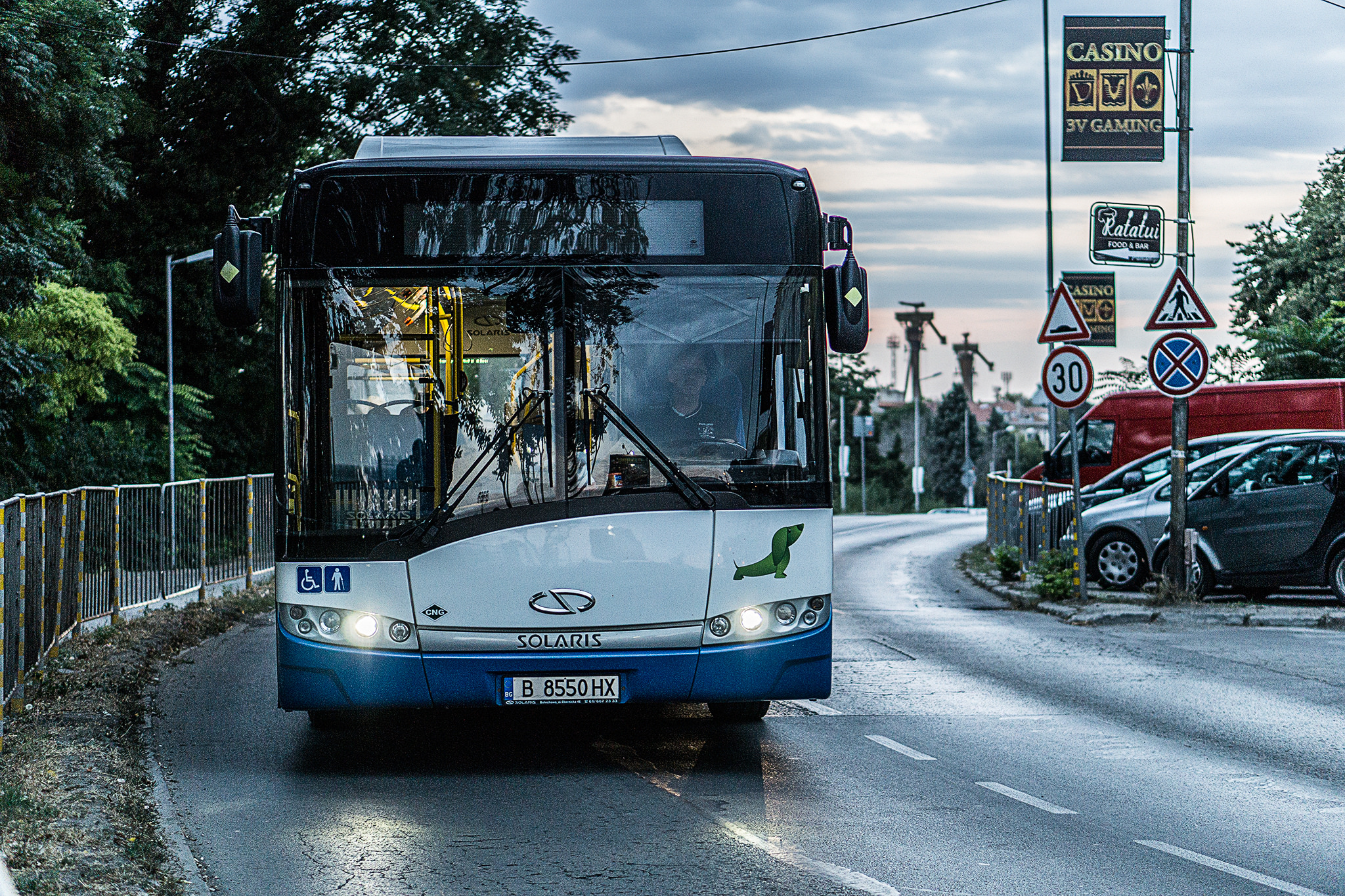
Local bus

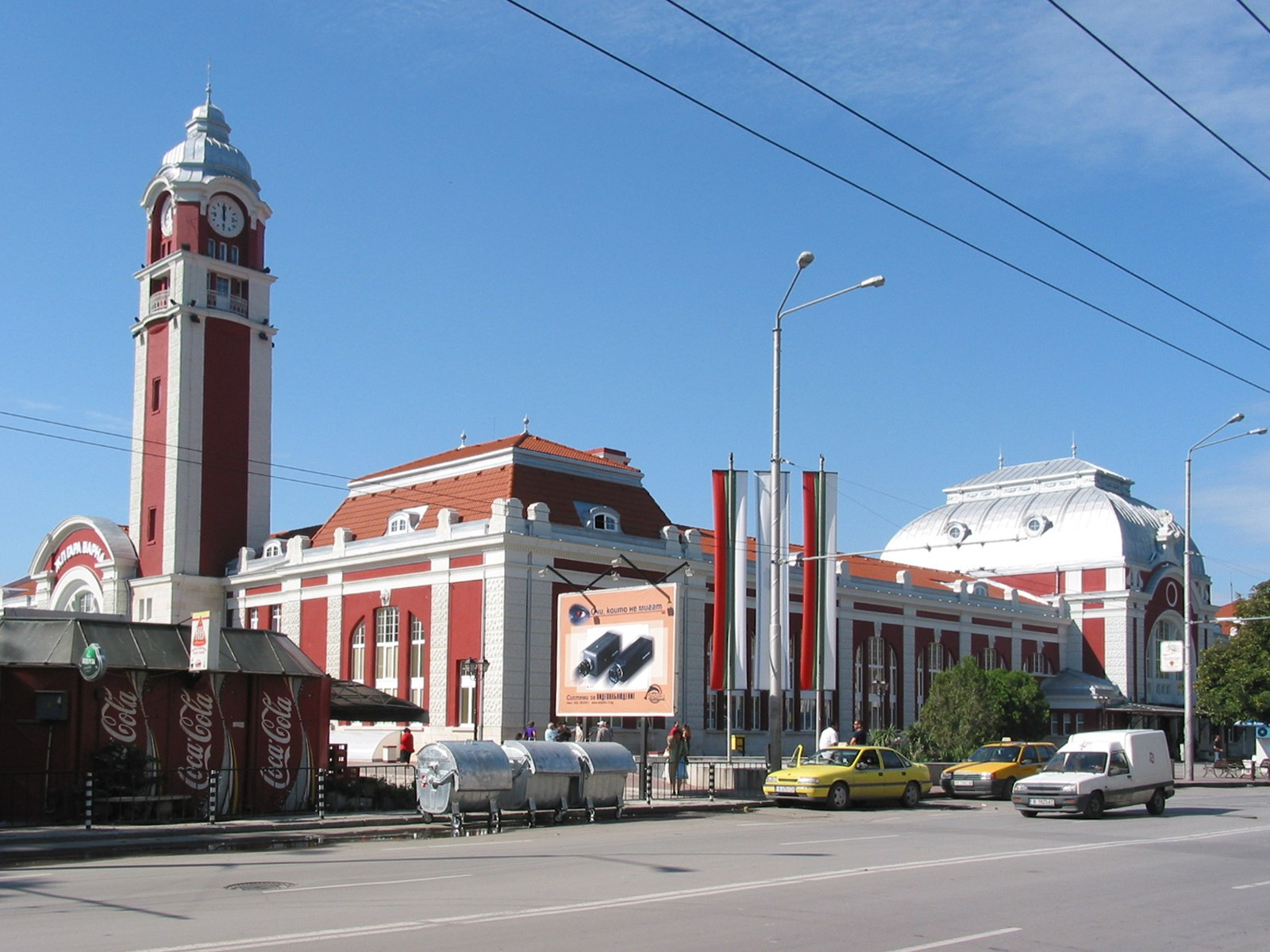
Central Railway Station

Varna is accessible by air (Varna International Airport), sea (Port of Varna Cruise Terminal), railway (Central railway station), bus, and road.

Major roads include European roads Varna – Bucharest E70, Varna – Istanbul E87 and Varna – Constanta, Romania; national motorways Varna – Sofia A2 (Hemus motorway) and Varna – Burgas A5 (Cherno More motorway). There are bus routes to many Bulgarian and international cities from two bus terminals. There are also train, ferry and roll-on/roll-off services to Odesa, Ukraine, Port Kavkaz, Russia, Poti and Batumi, Georgia.

The public transport system is managed by "City Transport Varna" and has been recently modernised. Ticket prices are reasonable: from 1lv (0.50€) for city zones to 3lv (1.50€) for routes Varna – Golden Sands. Along with local buses, trolleybuses, fixed-route minibus lines, there is also a large fleet of taxis.

In 2021, a light rail (LRT) system was proposed by the municipality. It is expected to connect the airport with the central part of the city, with several underground sections and stations. The funding will be provided by the EU programmes.

== Landmarks ==
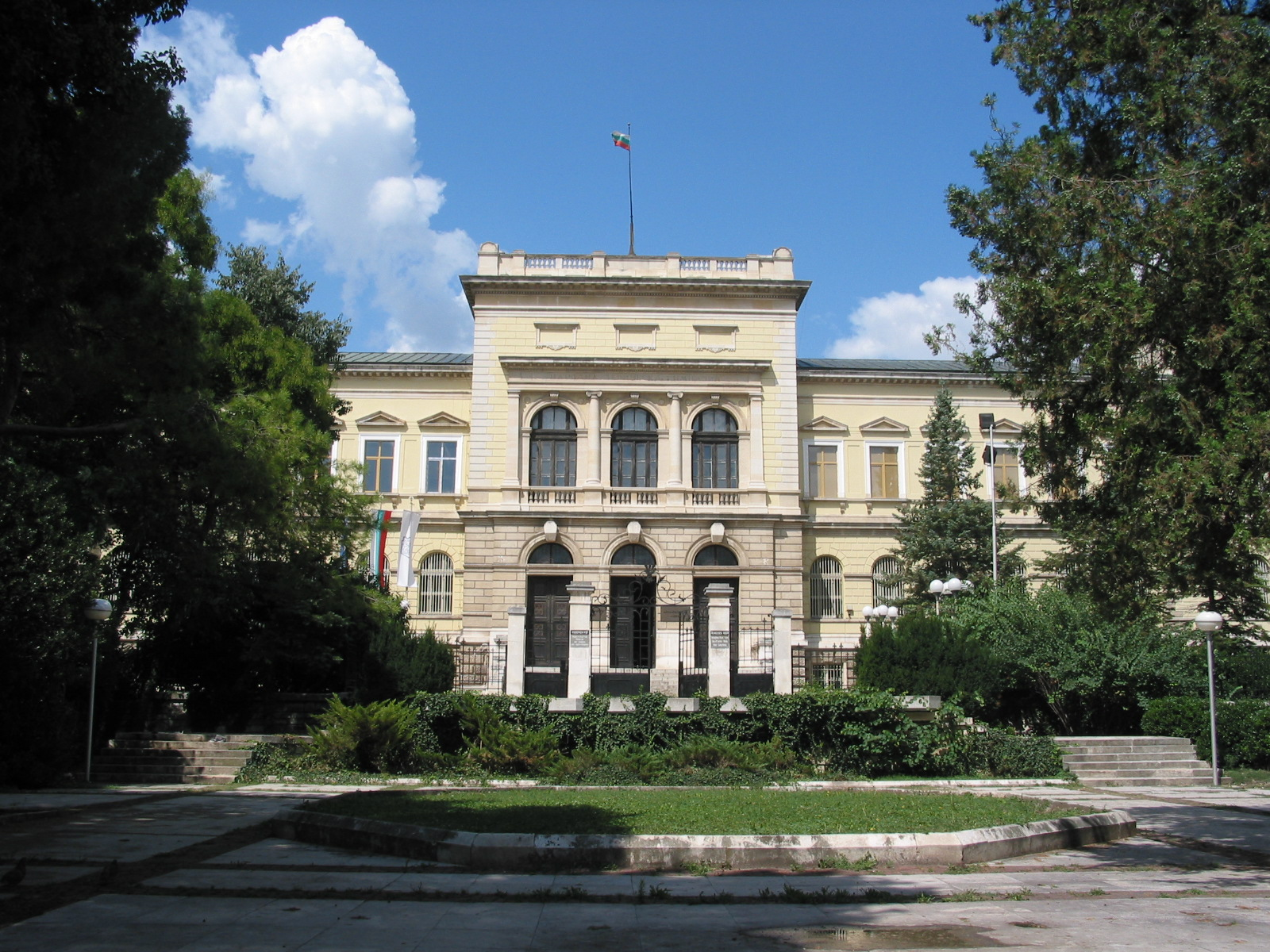
The Archaeological Museum occupies an ornate 19th-century former girls' school

City landmarks include the Varna Archaeological Museum, exhibiting the Gold of Varna, the Roman Baths, the Battle of Varna Park Museum, the Naval Museum in the Italianate Villa Assareto displaying the museum ship Drazki torpedo boat, the Museum of Ethnography in an Ottoman-period compound featuring the life of local urban dwellers, fisherfolk, and peasants in the late 19th and early 20th century.

Varna City Card can be used to see several landmarks of the city, including cultural locations. The card also offers some discounts to tourists at restaurants and bars.

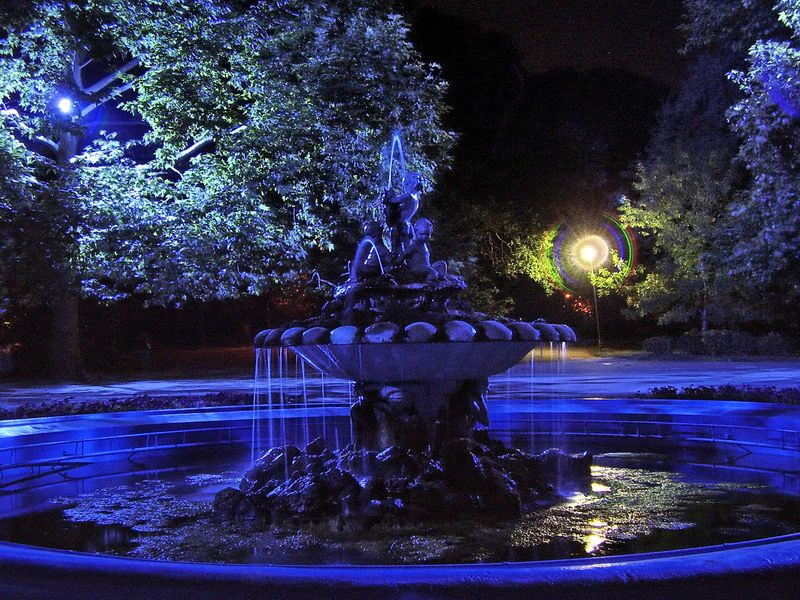
"Fountain of the Sirens" in the Sea Garden

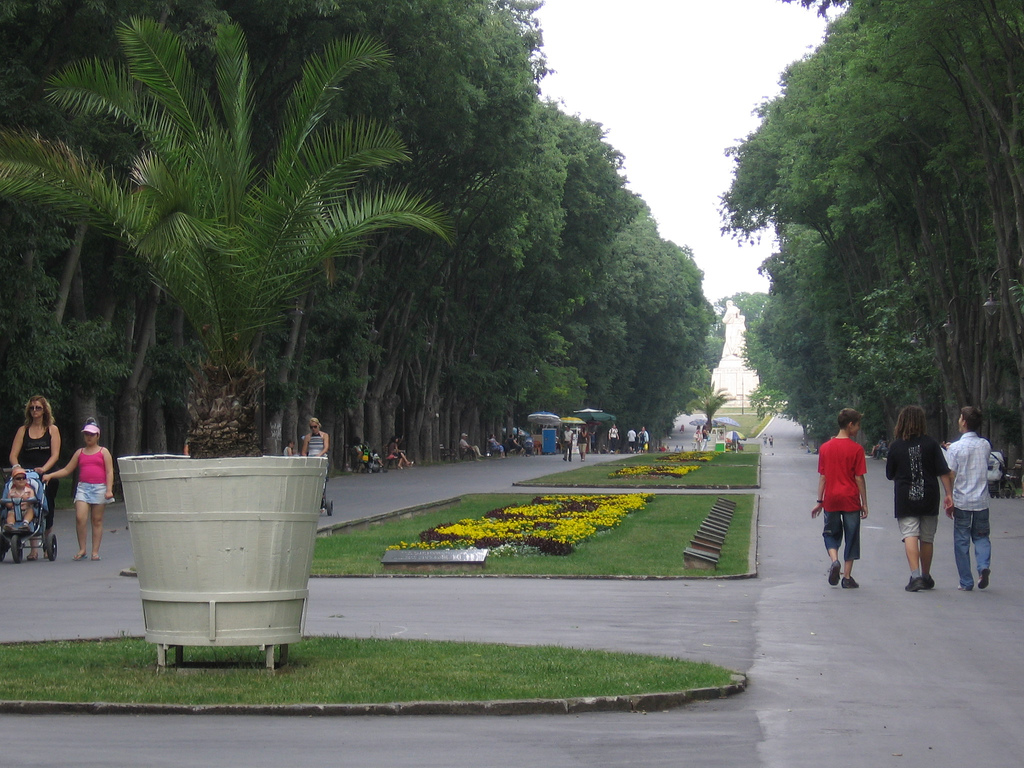
The Sea Garden

The 'Sea Garden' is the oldest and perhaps largest park in town containing an open-air theatre (venue of the International Ballet Competition, opera performances and concerts), Varna Aquarium (opened 1932), the Festa Dolphinarium (opened 1984), the Nicolaus Copernicus Observatory and Planetarium, the Museum of Natural History, a terrarium, a zoo, an alpineum, a children's amusement park with a pond, boathouse and ice-skating rink, and other attractions. The National Revival Alley is decorated with bronze monuments to prominent Bulgarians, and the Cosmonauts' Alley contains trees planted by Yuri Gagarin and other Soviet and Bulgarian cosmonauts. The Garden is a national monument of landscape architecture and is said to be the largest landscaped park in the Balkans.

The waterfront promenade is lined by a string of beach clubs offering a scene of rock, hip-hop, Bulgarian and American-style pop, techno, and chalga. In October 2006, The Independent dubbed Varna "Europe's new funky-town, the good-time capital of Bulgaria". The city has a nationwide reputation for its rock, hip-hop, world music, and other artists, clubs, and related events such as July Morning and international rock and hip-hop (including graffiti) venues.

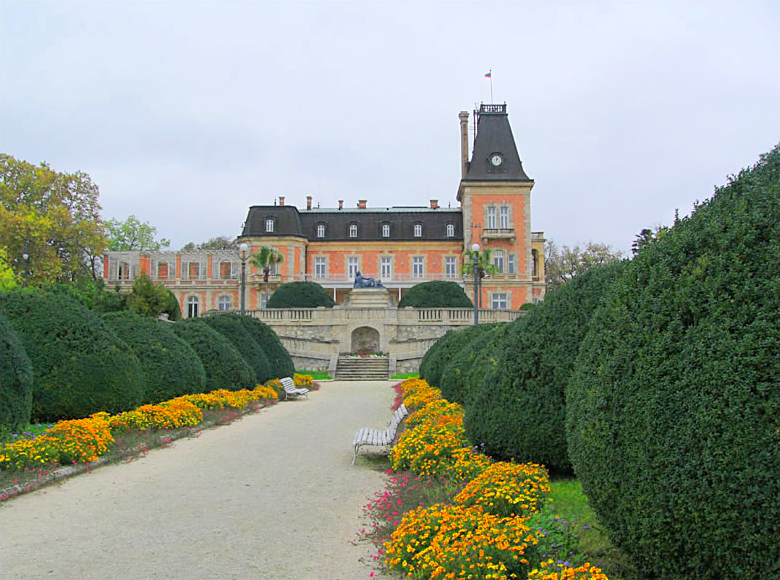
Euxinograd palace

The city beaches, also known as sea baths (морски бани, morski bani), are dotted with hot (up to 55°С/131 °F) sulphuric mineral water sources (used for spas, swimming pools and public showers) and punctured by small sheltered marinas. Additionally, the 2.05 km (1.27 mi) long, 52 m (171 ft) high Asparuhov most bridge is a popular spot for bungee jumping. Outside the city are the Euxinograd palace, park and winery, the University of Sofia Botanical Garden (Ecopark Varna), the Pobiti Kamani rock phenomenon, and the medieval cave monastery, Aladzha.

Tourist shopping areas include the boutique rows along Prince Boris Blvd (with retail rents rivalling Vitosha Blvd in Sofia) and adjacent pedestrian streets, as well as the large mall and big-box cluster in the Mladost district, suitable for motorists. Two other shopping plazas, Piccadilly Park and Central Plaza, are conveniently located to serve tourists in the resorts north of the city centre, both driving and riding the public transit. ATMs and 24/7 gas stations with convenience stores abound.

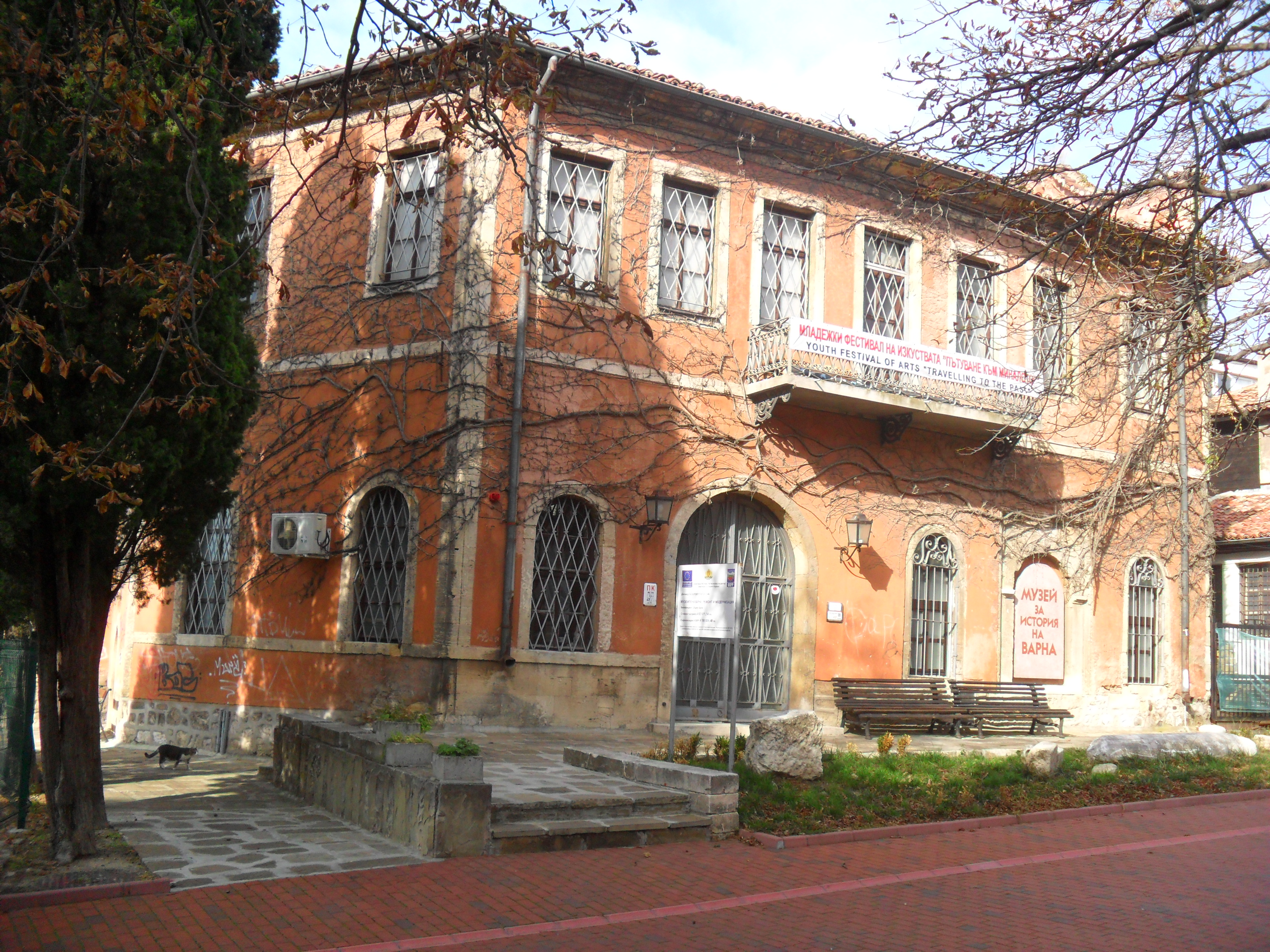
Varna History Museum

Food markets, among others, include supermarket chains Billa, Kaufland and Metro. In stores and restaurants, credit cards are normally accepted. There is a number of farmers markets offering fresh local produce; the Kolkhozen Pazar, the largest one, also has a fresh fish market but is located in a crowded area virtually inaccessible for cars.

Like other cities in the region, Varna has its share of stray dogs, calm and friendly, flashing orange clips on the ears showing they have been castrated and vaccinated. However, urban wildlife is dominated by the ubiquitous seagulls, while brown squirrels inhabit the Sea Garden. Cats are also everywhere in the city. In January and February, migrating swans winter on the sheltered beaches.

=== Churches ===
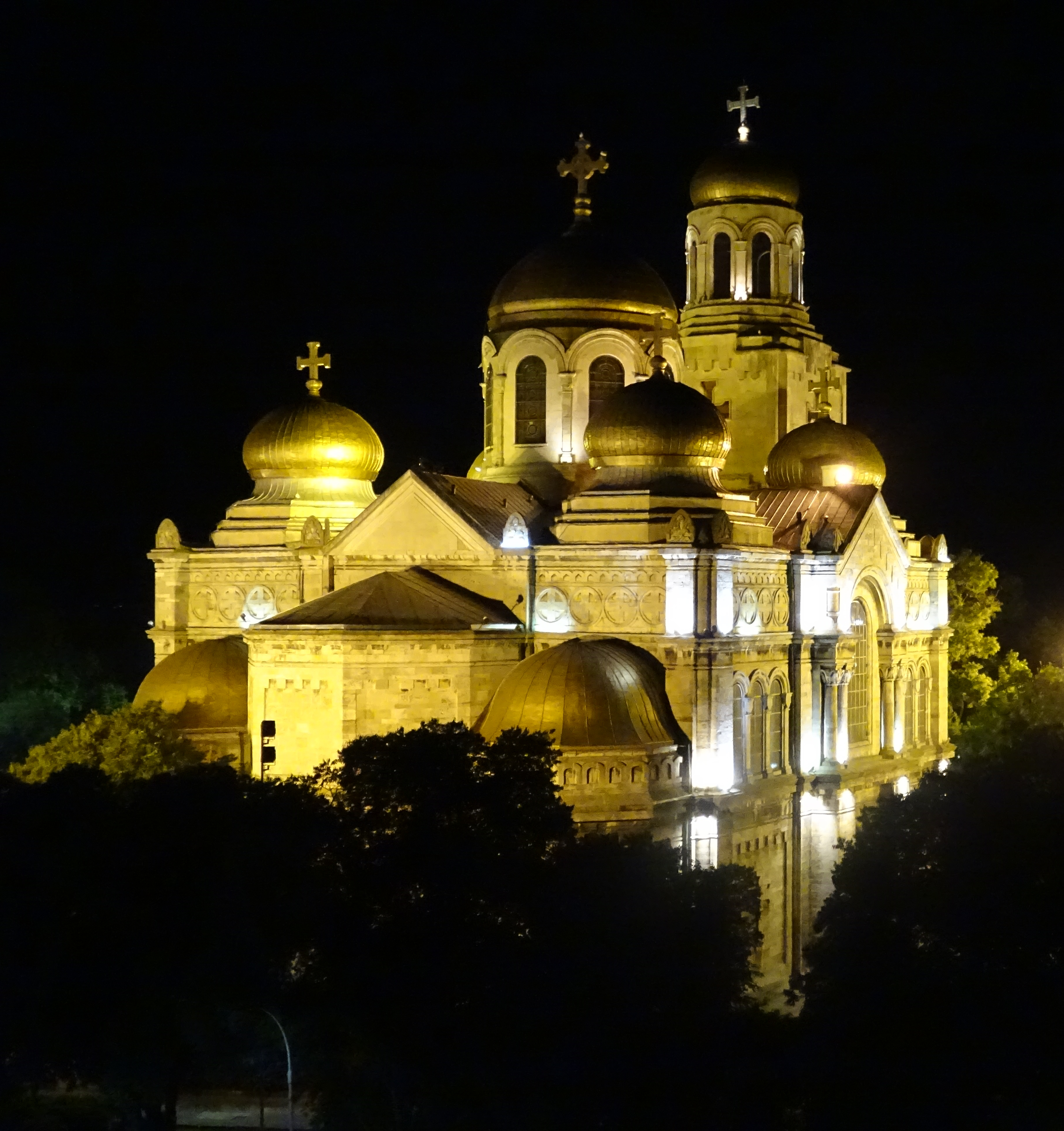
Dormition of the Theotokos Cathedral at night

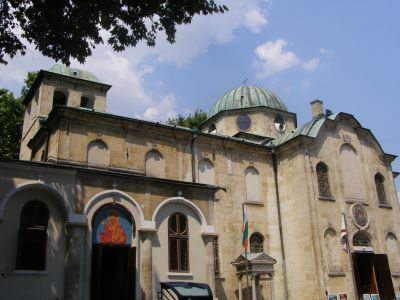
Saint Nicholas seamen's church

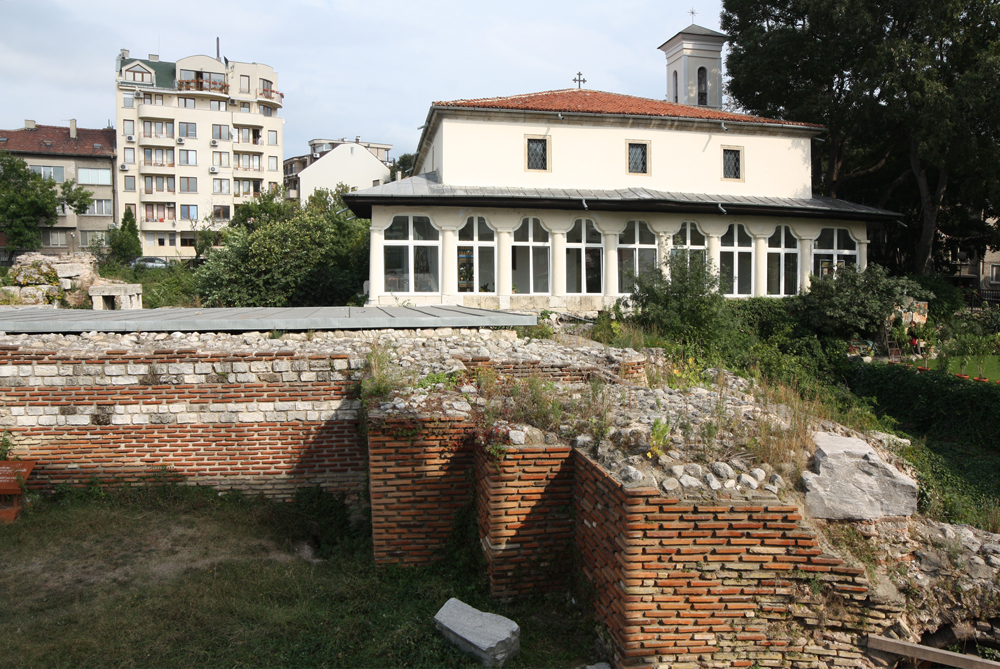
St. Athanasius church with ancient thermae in foreground

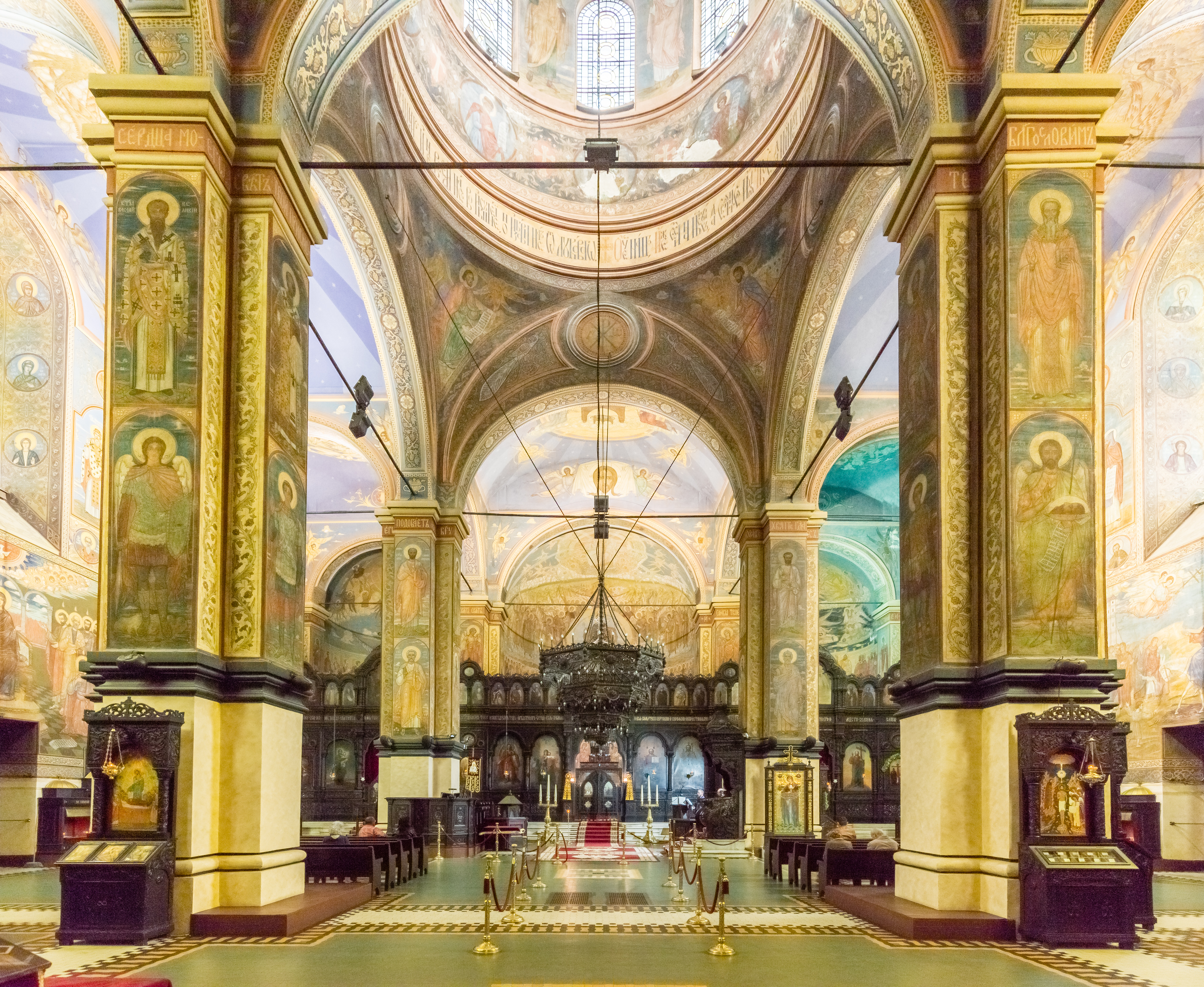
Interior of the Dormition of the Theotokos Cathedral

Notable old Bulgarian Orthodox temples include the metropolitan Dormition of the Theotokos Cathedral (of the diocese of Varna and Veliki Preslav); the early-17th-century Theotokos Panagia (built on the site of an earlier church where Ladislaus III was perhaps buried); the St. Athanasius (former Greek metropolitan cathedral) on the footprint of a razed 10th-century church; the 15th-century St. Petka Parashkeva chapel; the seamen's church of Saint Nicholas; the Archangel Michael chapel, site of the first Bulgarian secular school from the National Revival era; and the Sts. Constantine and Helena church of the 14th-century suburban monastery of the same name.

The remains of a large 4th- to 5th-century stronghold basilica in Dzhanavara Park just south of town are becoming a tourist destination with some exquisite mosaics displayed in situ. The remains of another massive 9th-century basilica adjacent to the scriptorium at Boris I's Theotokos Panagia monastery are being excavated and conserved. A 4th- to 5th-century episcopal basilica north of the Thermae is also being restored. There is also a number of newer Orthodox temples; two, dedicated to apostle Andrew and the local martyr St. Procopius of Varna, are currently under construction. Many smaller Orthodox chapels have mushroomed in the area. In early 2009, Vasil Danev, leader of the ethnic Organization of the United Roma Communities (FORO), said local Roma would also erect an Orthodox chapel.

There is an Armenian Apostolic church; two Roman Catholic churches, a thriving Evangelical Methodist episcopal church offering organ concerts, active Evangelical Pentecostal, Seventh-day Adventist, and two Baptist churches.

Two old mosques (one is open) have survived since Ottoman times, when there were 18 of them in town, as have two once stately but now dilapidated synagogues, a Sephardic and an Ashkenazic one, the latter in Gothic style (it is undergoing restoration). A new mosque was recently added in the southern Asparuhovo district serving the adjacent Muslim Roma neighbourhood.

There is also a Buddhist centre.

On a different note, spiritual master Peter Deunov started preaching his Esoteric Christianity doctrine in Varna in the late 1890s, and, in 1899–1908, the yearly meetings of his Synarchic Chain, later known as the Universal White Brotherhood, were convened there.

=== Architecture ===
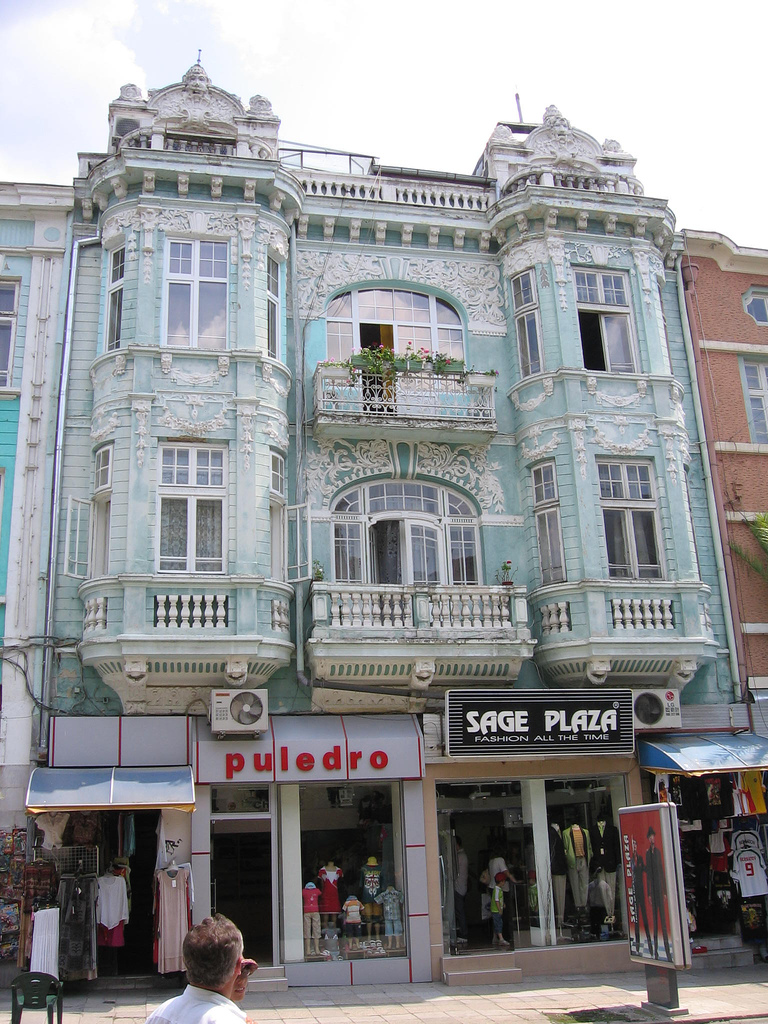
Art Nouveau mansion on Prince Boris I Boulevard

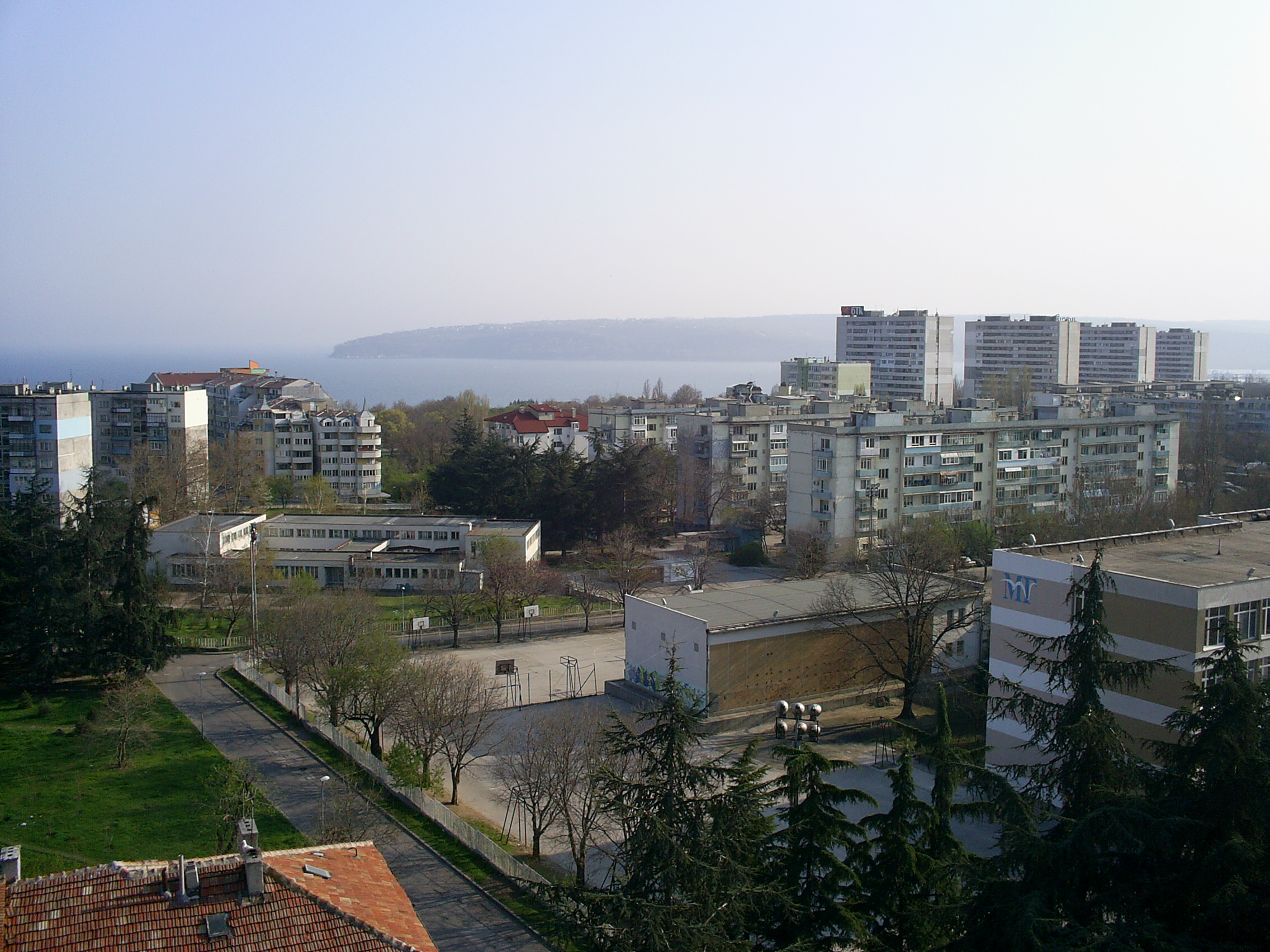
Chaika apartment complex, the socialist showcase for the 1972 World Congress of Architecture

By 1878, Varna was an Ottoman city of mostly wooden houses in a style characteristic of the Black Sea coast, densely packed along narrow, winding lanes. It was surrounded by a stone wall restored in the 1830s with a citadel, a moat, ornamented iron gates flanked by towers, and a vaulted stone bridge across the River Varna. The place abounded in pre-Ottoman relics, ancient ruins were widely used as stone quarries.

Today, very little of this legacy remains; the city centre was rebuilt by the nascent Bulgarian middle class in late 19th and early 20th centuries in Western style with local interpretations of Neo-Renaissance, Neo-Baroque, Neoclassicism, Art Nouveau and Art Deco (many of those buildings, whose ownership was restored after 1989, underwent renovations).

Stone masonry from demolished city walls was used for the cathedral, the two elite high schools, and for paving new boulevards. The middle class built practical townhouses and coop buildings. Elegant mansions were erected on main boulevards and in the vineyards north of town. A few industrial working-class suburbs (of one-family cottages with small green yards) emerged. Refugees from the 1910s wars also settled in similar poorer yet vibrant neighbourhoods along the city edges.

During the rapid urbanisation of the 1960s to the early 1980s, large apartment complexes sprawled onto land formerly covered by small private vineyards or agricultural cooperatives as the city population tripled. Beach resorts were designed mostly in a sleek modern style, which was somewhat lost in their recent more lavish renovations. Modern landmarks of the 1960s include the Palace of Culture and Sports, built in 1968.

With the country's return to capitalism since 1989, upscale apartment buildings mushroomed both downtown and on uptown terraces overlooking the sea and the lake. Varna's vineyards (лозя, lozya), dating back perhaps to antiquity and stretching for miles around, started turning from mostly rural grounds dotted with summer houses or villa into affluent suburbs sporting opulent villas and family hotels, epitomised by the researched postmodernist kitsch of the Villa Aqua.

With the new suburban construction far outpacing infrastructure growth, ancient landslides were activated, temporarily disrupting major highways. As the number of vehicles quadrupled since 1989, Varna became known for traffic jams; parking on the old town's leafy but narrow streets normally takes the sidewalks. At the same time, stretches of shanty towns, more befitting Rio de Janeiro, remain in Romani neighbourhoods on the western edge of town due to complexities of local politics.

The beach resorts were rebuilt and expanded, without being as heavily overdeveloped as were other tourist destinations on the Bulgarian Black Sea Coast, and their greenery was mostly preserved. New modern office buildings started reshaping the old centre and the city's surroundings.

== Education ==
In 2016, Varna was home to over 37,000 students.

=== Higher education ===
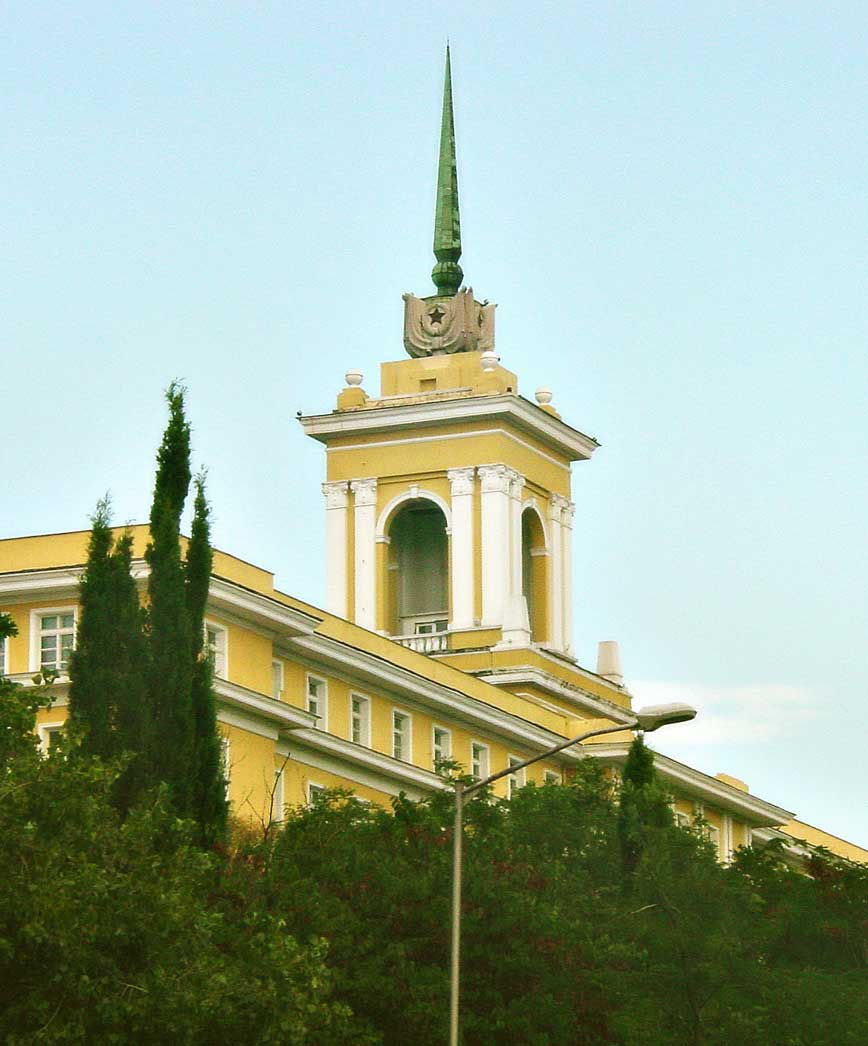
Nikola Vaptsarov Naval Academy

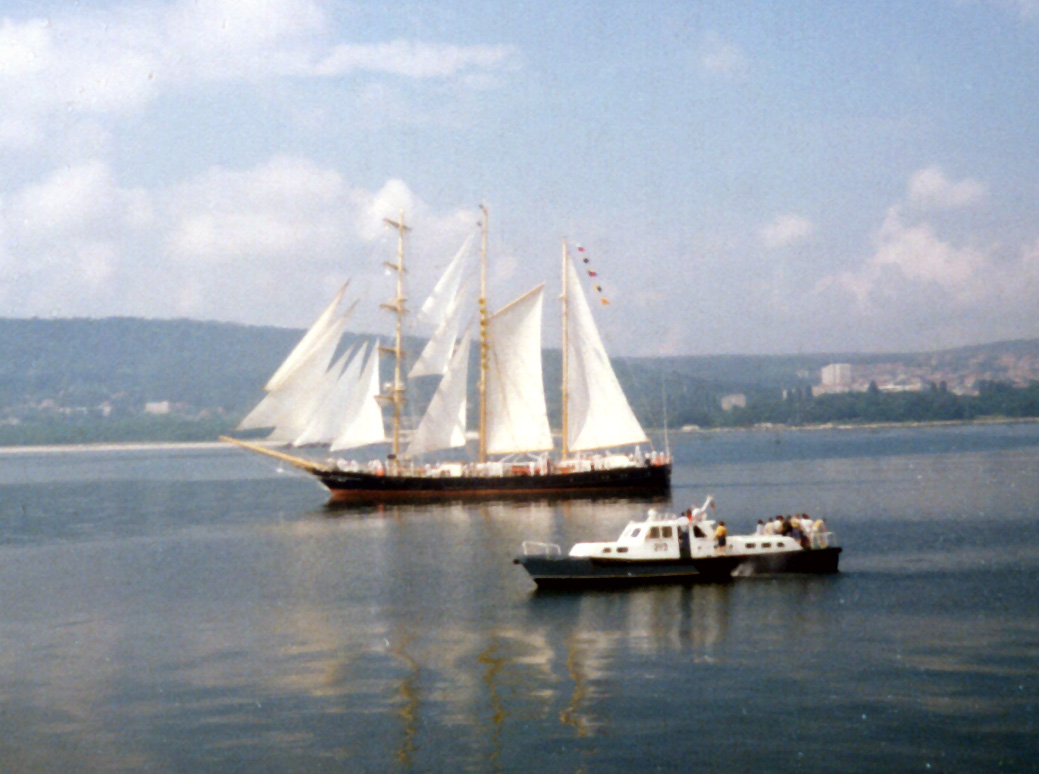
Kaliakra, the Naval Academy training barquentine, in Varna Bay

- University of Economics, founded on 14 May 1920 as the Higher School of Commerce, is the second oldest Bulgarian university after Sofia University. It is the first private one—underwritten by the Varna Chamber of Commerce and Industry. Prof. Tsani Kalyandzhiev, University of Zurich alumni and a research chemist in the United States, was university's first rector (principal).
- Nikola Vaptsarov Naval Academy is the oldest technical educational institution in Bulgaria. The institution started as a Maritime School, established in 1881 in Ruse. After 1900 the now called Engineering School to the Fleet was moved to Varna and subsequently named as His Majesty's Naval Academy in 1942. In 1949, the Naval School adopted as its patron Nikola Vaptsarov, a poet, who graduated the school in 1926, and received the name N. Y. Vaptsarov People's Naval School.
- Medical University Varna was established in 1961 and is a recognised abroad as a leading institution for quality medical education. The university has attracted students from 44 countries and is partnering with 85 foreign institutions across the globe.
- Technical University of Varna was founded in 1962 and was first established as Mechanical-Electrical Engineering Institute.
- Chernorizets Hrabar Varna Free University, founded in 1991, was the first private university after 1989. It specialises in International Economics and Administration, Law, and Architecture.

=== Institutes and colleges ===
There are four BAS research institutes: Oceanology, Fisheries, Aero and Hydrodynamics, Metallography. The Institute of Oceanology (IO-BAS) has been active in Black Sea deluge theory studies and deepwater archaeology in cooperation with Columbia University, MIT, UPenn, and National Geographic.

Colleges:

- College of Tourism, University of Economics
- Higher School of Management

Other universities' local branches:

- New Bulgarian University Local Centre Varna
- Constantine of Preslav University of Shumen Department of Information, Qualification and Continuing Education Varna

=== Secondary education ===
Some of the top high schools are:

- First Language School (English and German)
- Dr. Petar Beron Second High School of Mathematics
- Acad. Metodi Popov Third High School of Science and Mathematics
- Frédéric Joliot-Curie Fourth Language School (French, English, Spanish and Portuguese)
- John Exarch Fifth Language School (English, German, French and Russian)
- Alexander Pushkin Eighth Language School (English, Russian, Italian, German and French)
- Constantine of Preslav National High School for the Humanities and Arts
- Dobri Hristov National School of Arts (instrumental and vocal music, dance, and visual arts)
- Private Trade School (offering opportunities for international students and distance education)

=== Libraries ===
- Pencho Slaveikov Public Library

== Culture ==
Varna has some of the oldest museums, professional arts companies, and arts festivals in the nation and is known for its century-old traditions in visual arts, music, and book publishing, as well as for its bustling current hip hop and pop-culture scene. Over the past few decades, it developed as a festival centre of international standing. Varna was a front-runner for European Capital of Culture for 2019, planning to open several new high-profile facilities such as a new opera house and concert hall, a new exhibition centre, and a reconstruction of the Summer Theatre, the historic venue of the International Ballet Competition.

=== Museums ===
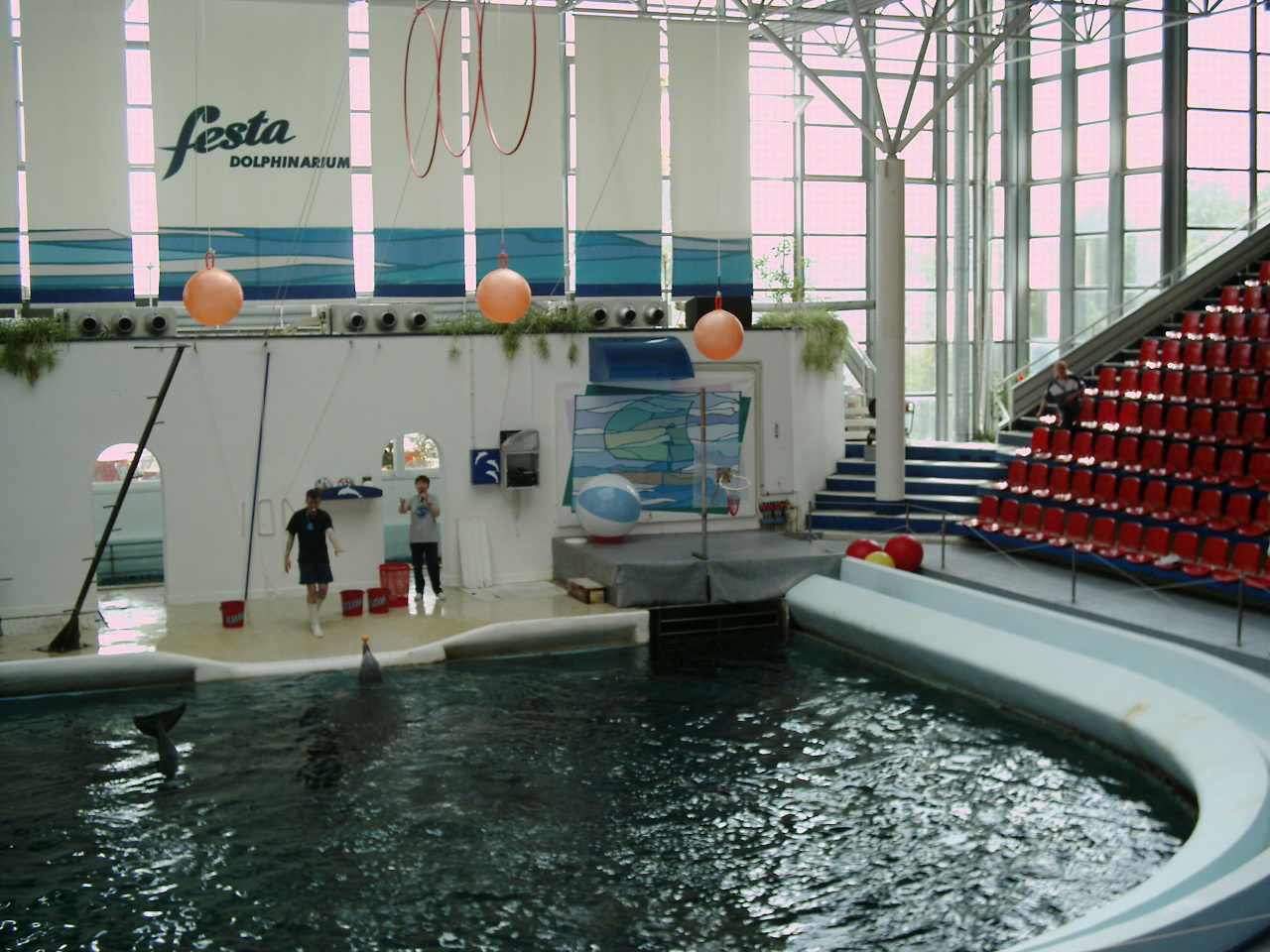
The Dolphinarium

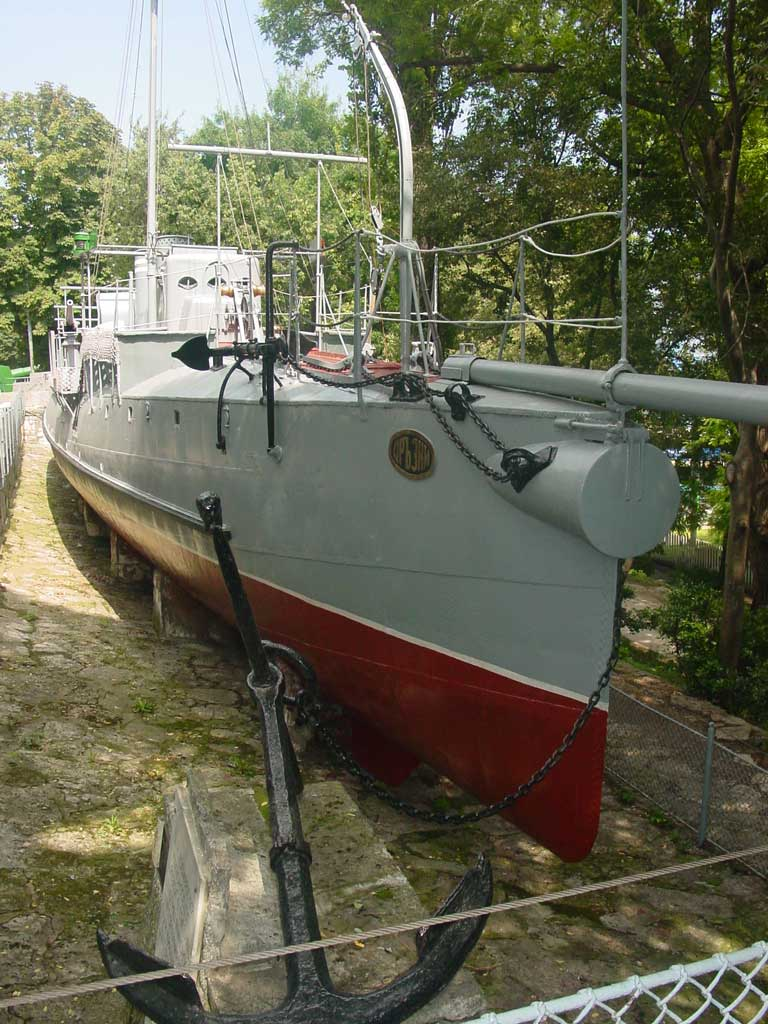
National Naval Museum, on display Drazki torpedo boat

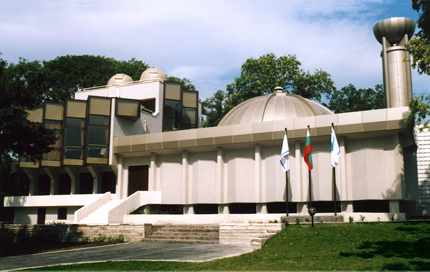
"Nicolaus Copernicus" Observatory and Planetarium

- Varna Archaeological Museum (founded 1888)
- Naval Museum (founded 1923)
- Roman Baths
- Aladzha Monastery
- Battle of Varna Park Museum (founded 1924)
- Museum of Ethnography
- National Revival Museum
- History of Varna Museum
- History of Medicine Museum
- Health Museum (children's)
- Puppet Museum (antique puppets from Puppet Theatre shows)
- Bulgar Settlement of Phanagoria ethnographical village (mockup, with historical reenactments)
- Aquarium (founded 1912)
- Nicolaus Copernicus Observatory and Planetarium
- Naval Academy Planetarium
- Museum of Natural History
- Terrarium
- Varna Zoo
- Dolphinarium (founded 1984)

=== Galleries ===
- Boris Georgiev City Art Gallery
- Georgi Velchev Gallery
- Modern Art Centre (Graffit Gallery Hotel)
- Print Gallery
- Numerous smaller fine and applied arts galleries

=== Performing arts professional companies ===
Stoyan Bachvarov Dramatic Theatre

- Opera and Philharmonic Society (opera, symphonic and chamber music, ballet, and operetta performances; earliest philharmonic society founded 1888)
- Stoyan Bachvarov Drama Theatre (founded 1921)
- State Puppet Theatre Varna (in Bulgarian, founded 1952; often cited as the finest one in the nation, performances for children and adults)
- Bulgarian Theatre
- Varna Ensemble (traditional folk music and dance)

=== Other performing arts groups ===
- Morski Zvutsi Choir School (academic choirs)
- Dobri Hristov Choir School (academic choir)

=== Notable bands and artists ===
- Deep Zone (tech house/electro)
- DJ Balthazar (house)
- Big Sha and the Gumeni glavi (Rubber Heads) (hip hop)
- 100 Kila (hip hop)
- Elitsa Todorova (ethnic & electro)
- Stephen Sacklarian (artist)
- Nelko Kolarov (composer, musician)
- Gery-Nikol Georgieva, Gery-Nikol (pop, R&B, club)
- Darina Yotova, Dara (pop, R&B)

=== Concert halls ===
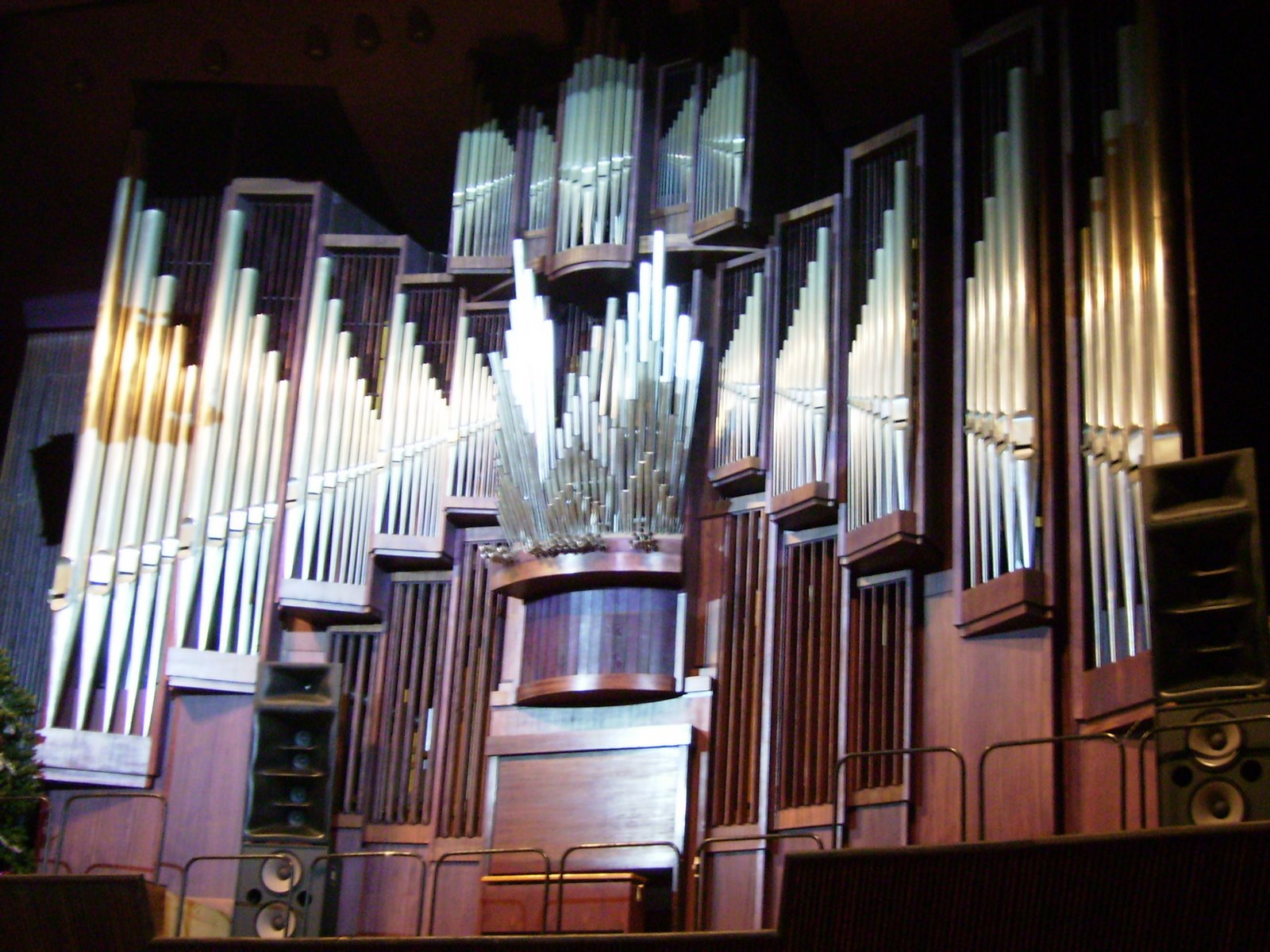
Festival Centre organ

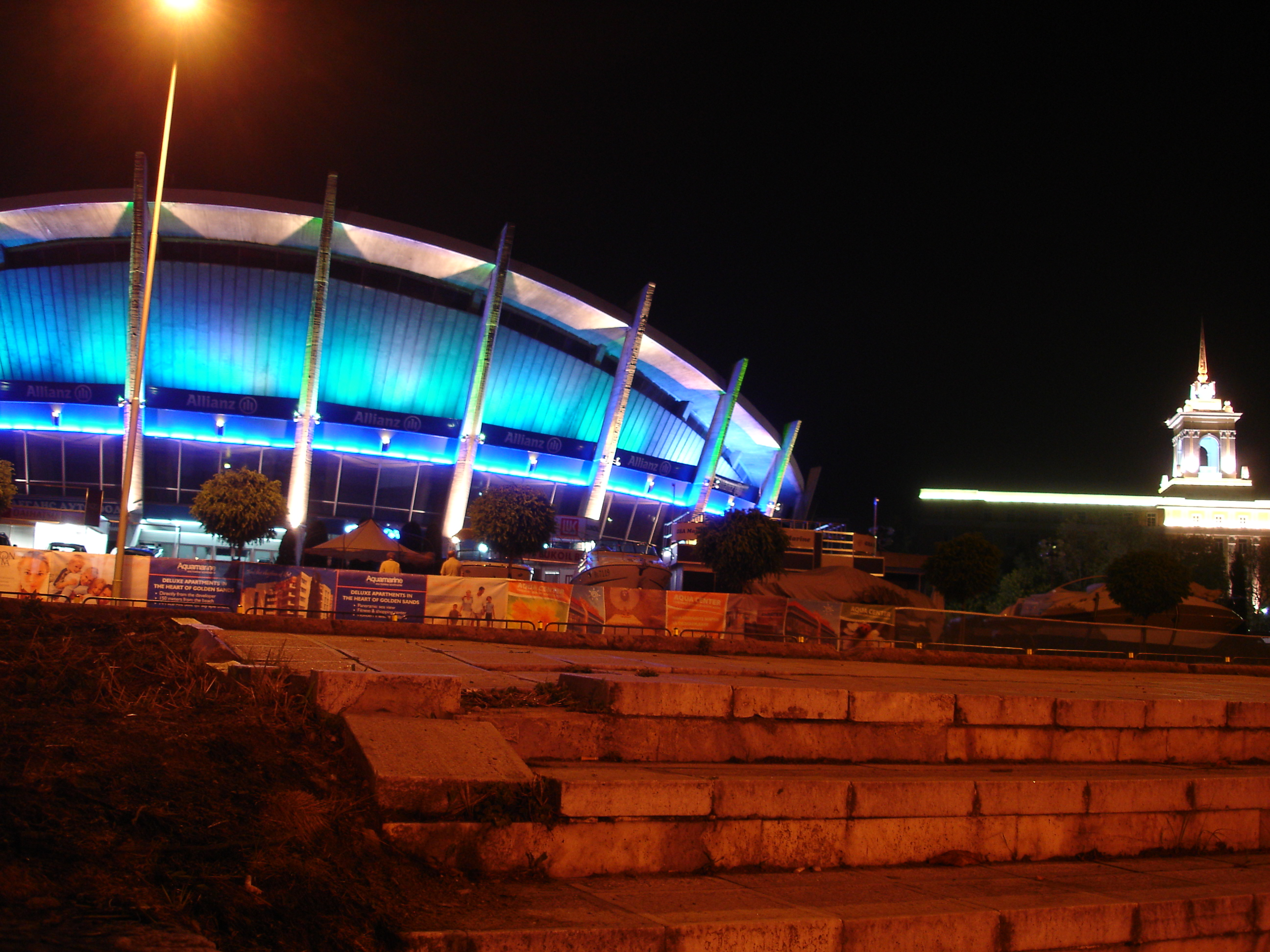
The Palace of Culture and Sports also hosts trade shows.

- Festival and Congress Centre (in Bulgarian, 1986; concerts, film, theatre and dance shows, exhibitions, trade shows)
- Palace of Culture and Sports (1968; sports events, concerts, film shows, exhibitions, trade shows, sports classes, fitness)

=== International arts festivals ===
- In the Palace International Short Film Festival, founded in 2003, annual
- Varna International Ballet Competition, founded 1964 (biennial)
- Varna Summer International Music Festival, founded 1926 (annual)
- RADAR Festival Beyond Music, founded 2014 (annual)
- Moving Body Festival, founded 2016 (annual)
- Without Borders International art forum and Festival – Varna, Albena, Balchik (biannual)
- Varna Summer International Jazz Festival (annual)
- International May Choir Competition (annual)
- European Music Festival (annual)
- Operosa Euxinograd opera festival (annual)
- Sea and Memories international music festival devoted to popular sea songs (annual)
- International Folk Festival, (annual)
- Discovery International Pop Festival (annual)
- Song on Three Seas pop and rock competition (annual)
- Brazilian Culture Festival (annual)
- Varna Summer International Theatre Festival (annual)
- Golden Dolphin Intenrtional puppet festival (triennial)
- Under the Stars arts festival (annual, theatre and opera)
- Zvezdna daga children's competition (annual)
- Love is Folly film festival (annual)
- International Festival of Red Cross & Health Films (biennial, founded in 1965) International Red Cross Films Festival
- World Animation Festival (founded 1979, to resume in 2009)
- International Print Biennial (founded 1981)
- August in Art festival of visual arts (triennial) (in Bulgarian)
- Videoholica international art festival (annual)
- product Festival of Contemporary Art (annual)
- Slavic Embrace Slav poetry readings (annual)
- Fotosalon (annual)

=== National events ===
- Golden Rose Bulgarian Feature Film Festival
- Got Flow National Hip-Hop Dance Festival (annual)
- May Arts Saloon at Radio Varna
- Bulgaria for All National Ethnic Festival (annual, minority authentic folklore)
- Dinyo Marinov National Children's Authentic Folklore Music Festival
- Morsko konche (Seahorse) children's vocal competition (annual, pop)
- Navy Day (second Sunday of August)
- Urban Folk Song Festival
- Christmas Folk Dance Competition

=== Local events ===
- Easter music festival
- Classical guitar festival
- Golden Fish fairy tale festival
- Kinohit movie marathon
- Crafts fair (August 2012)
- Dormition of the Theotokos festival, cathedral patron, Varna Day (15 August)
- Beer Fest
- Saint Nicholas Day (6 December)
- Christmas festival
- New Year's Eve concert and fireworks (Independence Square)
- Operosa Opera Festival
- Anifest (Anime, Manga and Japanese culture Festival)

=== Varna in fiction ===
- In Bram Stoker's 1897 novel Dracula Varna was Count Dracula's "transportation hub" — the point of origin of the ship Demeter, the initial destination of the Czarina Catherine, and the place where the vampire's annihilation was planned to be carried out.
- In the Mechanic: Resurrection film, Tommy Lee Jones's character Max Adams lives in Varna and the headquarters of his criminal organisation is based there.
- In Andrei Gulyashki's novel Avakoum Zahov versus 07 British spy 07 kidnapped Soviet physicist Konstantin Trofimov from a villa in Varna.
- In Geoffrey Trease's novel The Hills of Varna "the monastery at Varna" is a fictional place in the Balkans, not related to the real city.
- In All the Year Round (Vol. 30), 1873 Charles Dickens mentioned modern Varna when he visited the city as a war correspondent during the Crimean War in 1854.
- In Garth Greenwell's 2016 novel What Belongs to You Varna is the hometown of Mitko, the narrator's love interest, and a pivotal scene takes place in a hotel there.
- In Hungarian historical series Rise of the Raven the Battle of Varna is depicted as part of Hunyadi's crusade.

== Media ==
As early as the 1880s, numerous daily and weekly newspapers were published in Bulgarian and several minority languages. Local newspapers include: Cherno More, Chernomorie, Dialog, Narodno Delo, Pozvanete, Varna (weekly), Vlastta (e-newspaper), Varna Utre. The national newspapers' local editions are 24 Chasa More, Morski Dnevnik, Morski Trud. Morski Sviat and Prostori are the two major magazines published in Varna.

Local radio stations are Radio Varna opened in 1934, DarikNews (Varna), FM+ Varna, Radio Bravo, Alpha Radio (online radio). Local TV stations: BNT More, TV Cherno more, TV Varna.

Galaktika book publishing house occupied a prominent place nationally in the 1970–1990s, focusing on international sci-fi and marine fiction, contemporary non-fiction and poetry. Publishing houses in Varna include: Alfiola (New Age), Alpha Print (advertising), Atlantis, Kompas, Liternet (poetry, fiction, non-fiction: electronic and print), Naroden Buditel (history), Slavena (history, children's books, travel, multimedia, advertising).

Web portals include: Varna Info (general info, English), Moreto.net (general info, news), Chernomore.bg (news), Ida.bg (general info, news), Varnaeye (tourism, history, events and business), Varna-guide (travel guide), Programata (cultural guide), Varna-sport.com (sports), Varna na mladite (youth), Zdravochnik.bg (health guide).

== Sports ==
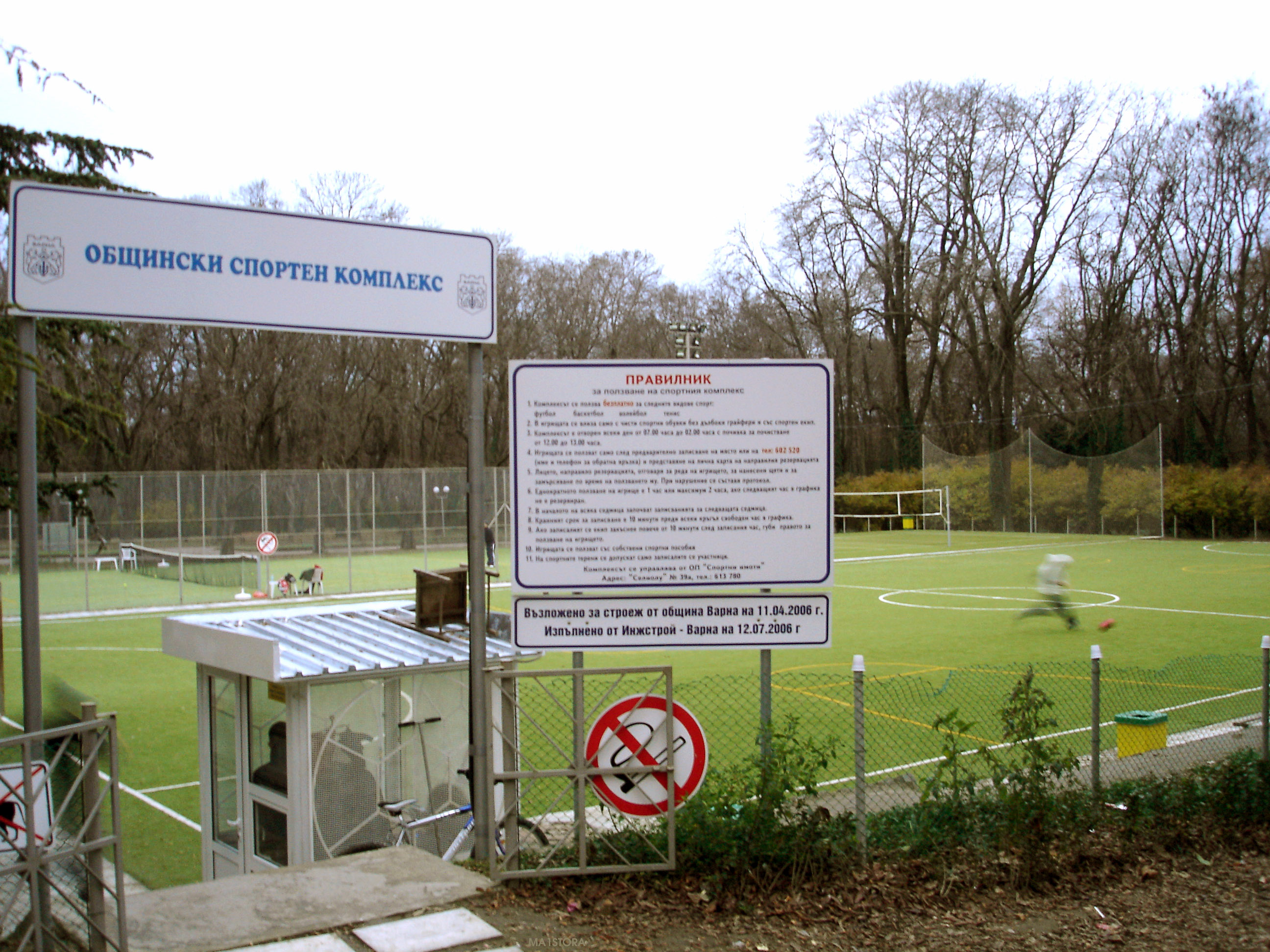
Sea Garden leisure centre

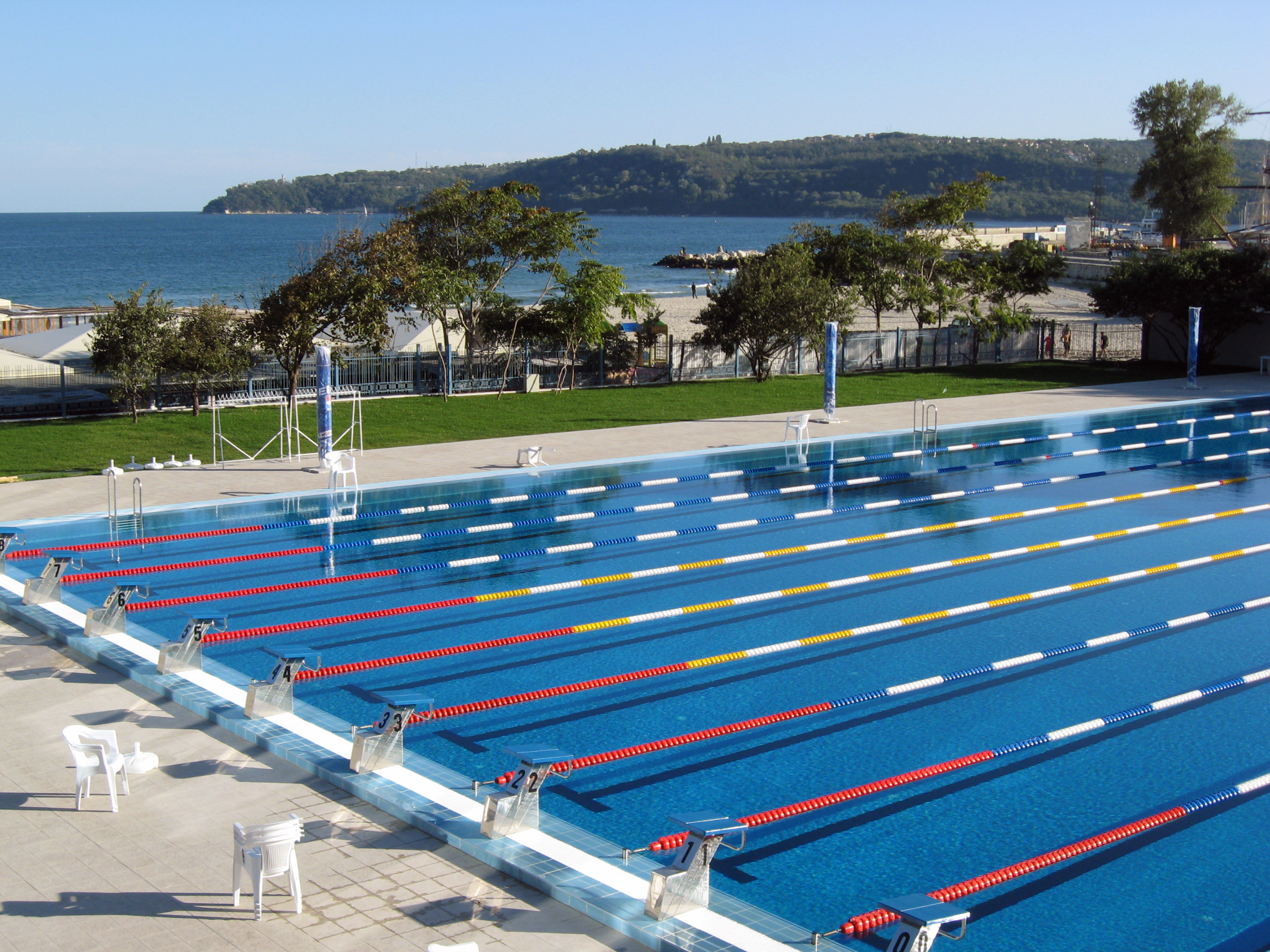
"Julian Rusev" swimming pool

=== Football ===
In the late 19th century, Varna was considered the birthplace of Bulgarian football with a Swiss gym teacher, Georges de Regibus, coaching the first varsity team at the men's high school. Association football is the biggest spectator sport with two rival clubs in the nation's top professional league, Cherno More (the Sailors), founded in 1913 and four times national champion, including the first championship in 1925, and Spartak (the Falcons), founded in 1918, one time champion and participant in the European Cup Winners' Cup in 1983, when it reached the second knockout round and played Manchester United. In 2021, Fratria was established. Few other football academies exist.

From 1993 to 2003, Grand Hotel Varna was a hegemon in the women football league, winning 10 consecutive titles.

By 2024, Spartak Stadium and Ticha Stadium are the biggest stadiums in town, since Yuri Gagarin Stadium demolition. New Varna Stadium is currently in construction on the place of Gagarin Stadium and is expected to become the biggest stadium in the city.

=== Swimming ===
Modern Bulgarian swimming dates to 18 May 1923 when the Bulgarian Public Marine Union was established in Varna. The organisation was the first to manage and administer swimming as a sport in Bulgaria. Famous Bulgarian swimmers from Varna are Aleksi Aleksiev (aka the Pope), Milko Rachev (aka Brother Milko), Maria Nikolova, Julian Rusev. Some of the leading swimming clubs are PSK Cherno More, KPS Asteri, KPS Torpedo, SKPS Albatros and KPS Cherno More.

Julian Rusev pool is the second oldest 50 m Olympic-size pool in the country, built in 1964 and located on the South beach in Varna. After a major redevelopment in 2008 council owned entity was established named Swimming Complex "Primorski". The 50m pool, now in line with FINA pool criteria, was adjacent to the water polo and diving pool "Aleksi Aleksiev". Subsequently, a third 25 m covered pool was built next to the diving pool along with a SPA & gym centre. There are three other swimming pools in the city.

On the first Sunday of August the marathon "Galata – Varna" takes place, the oldest Bulgarian swimming marathon. It dates back to 1939 and it attracts nearly 300 national and foreign swimmers. Bulgaria greatest swimmer Petar Stoychev holds the all-time record of 46 min for swimming the 4.5 km open water distance, crossing the Varna Bay.

=== Other sports ===
Men's basketball (Euroins Cherno More), women's volleyball, gymnastics, boxing, martial arts, sailing and tennis are also vibrant. A karting racing and a go kart track and a hippodrome with a horseback riding school is located in the Vinitsa neighborhood. Varna karting track is biggest track in Bulgaria .It has more than 30pcs rental go kart and 10 buggies. Another horse club is located just 10 minutes' drive away from Varna in the nearby village of Kichevo. Asparuhov bridge is a major Bulgarian bungee jumping site managed by Club Adrenalin. Cricket has been most recently introduced by ex-pats from cricket playing nations to the city's sport scene.

In August 2007 a new public leisure centre was opened in Mladost district. The track-field stadium consists of football, basketball and volleyball fields and is part of a larger complex of sports facilities for mini-golf, tennis, biking, mini-lakes and ice-skating. Other public leisure centres opened in the Sea Garden, Asparuhov Park and elsewhere. The number and range of gym and recreation clubs in Varna have increased in recent years, which reflects the healthy lifestyle of the average Varna citizens.

In the region, there are three golf courses—Lighthouse Golf Club, BlackSeaRama Golf & Villas and Thracian Cliffs Golf & Beach Resort. The three 18-hole golf courses are of professional quality, constructed in the region to the north of the city in the vicinity of Balchik and Kavarna.

Varna also hosts international competitions, including world championships, and national events in several sports on a regular basis, including auto racing and motocross, karting, open water swimming marathons. Bulgarian national basketball and volleyball teams host their games, including FIVB Volleyball World League games, at the Palace of Culture and Sports.

Varna athletes won one of the three medals for Bulgaria at the 2016 Summer Olympics and four of the 12 medals at the 2004 Summer Olympics.

=== Legacy: Other places named Varna ===
Varna Peninsula on Livingston Island in the South Shetland Islands, Antarctica, is named after Varna.

Varna, Illinois, a small town of 400 people, was named in this city's honour. The War of Varna was going on at the time.

Varnensky District and its administrative centre in the Chelyabinsk Oblast, Russia are named in commemoration of the taking of Varna by the Russian army during the 1828–1829 Russo-Turkish War.

Varna Drive, in Toronto, Canada, is named after this city. There is also a hamlet in southern Ontario (Huron County) named Varna.

Varna, an area just outside of Aarhus, Denmark. This was named after the Bulgarian city, because Baron Christian C. N. Gersdorff, a former owner of Marselisborg estate, had participated in Russian war service on the Black Sea coast.

Odesa, Ukraine, is named after the Greek name of Varna.

== See also ==
- Disappearance of Lars Mittank
- List of airports in Bulgaria
- List of cities and towns in Bulgaria
- List of mayors of Varna
- St. Nikolai, Varna
