= Katherine Haataja =

Finnish opera singer

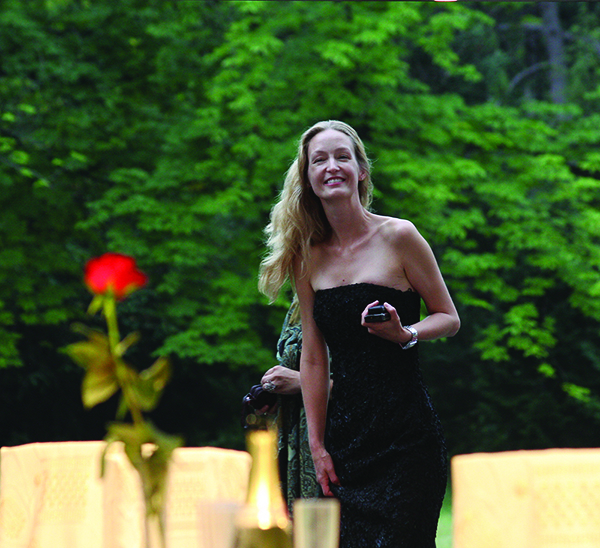
Haataja in 2010

Katherine Elina Haataja (née Hannikainen; February 16, 1969) is a Finnish-Swedish mezzo-soprano and entrepreneur, known for her work advocating for young opera artists. She is a descendant of the Hannikainen family of composers and writers, Pietari Hannikainen was her third great grandfather.

== Life and career ==
Haataja was born in Olofström in Sweden to a Swedish mother and Finnish father. She grew up in Helsinki in Finland and then studied vocal performance at the Paris conservatory and at Trinity College London. She started her career as opera singer but stopped when she became ill with breast cancer.

Haataja performed in different opera houses in Europe and her roles included Cherubino in Le Nozze di Figaro, Zerlina in Don Giovanni, Annius in La clemenza di Tito by W.A. Mozart, Angelina in La Cenerentola by G. Rossini, Tigrinda in Orlando finto pazzo by A. Vivaldi and Carlotta in Die schweigsame Frau by Richard Strauss. She has worked with conductors and directors Steven Devine, Steuart Bedford, Elgar Howarth, Stephen Unwin and David Fielding.

Haataja, her husband and their two children lived in the Balkan region for many years and following a guest performance in Le Nozze di Figaro at the Sofia National Opera, Haataja initiated the Operosa foundation in 2006. In her opinion the local opera houses did not offer enough opportunities for young singers and that the repertoire was to the most part too heavy and did not support the appropriate development of young opera voices. The foundation champions all opera talent in their studies and early career. Haataja is a frequent speaker at international opera conferences advocating the importance of rekindling opera to young audiences. She also teaches privately, coaches at master classes and contributes as jury member at international singing competitions.

== Operosa ==
Since 2006 Haataja's work with Operosa has spanned from Bulgaria to Serbia and to Montenegro. The inaugural festival was held in 2007 with fully staged performances of Don Giovanni by Mozart at the Euxinograd castle in Varna on the Black Sea coast of Bulgaria. In 2011 she set up Operosa offices in Belgrade in Serbia where the Operosa Academia activities were initiated. In 2013 she launched the first annual opera event in Montenegro. The Operosa Montenegro Opera Festival continues to promote young opera talent and takes place every summer in the Kanli Kula and Forte Mare Fortresses in the Old Town of Herceg Novi on the Adriatic coast of Montenegro.

== Recordings ==
- Perle - an album of opera arias with Sofia Symphonic Orchestra conducted by Nayden Todorov; 2007
