= Haataja =

Haataja is a Finnish surname. Notable people with the surname include:

- Juha-Pekka Haataja (born 1982), Finnish ice hockey player
- Katherine Haataja (born 1969), Finnish-Swedish mezzo-soprano
- Kyösti Haataja (1881–1956), Finnish politician
