= Varna Aquarium =

Aquarium in Varna, Bulgaria

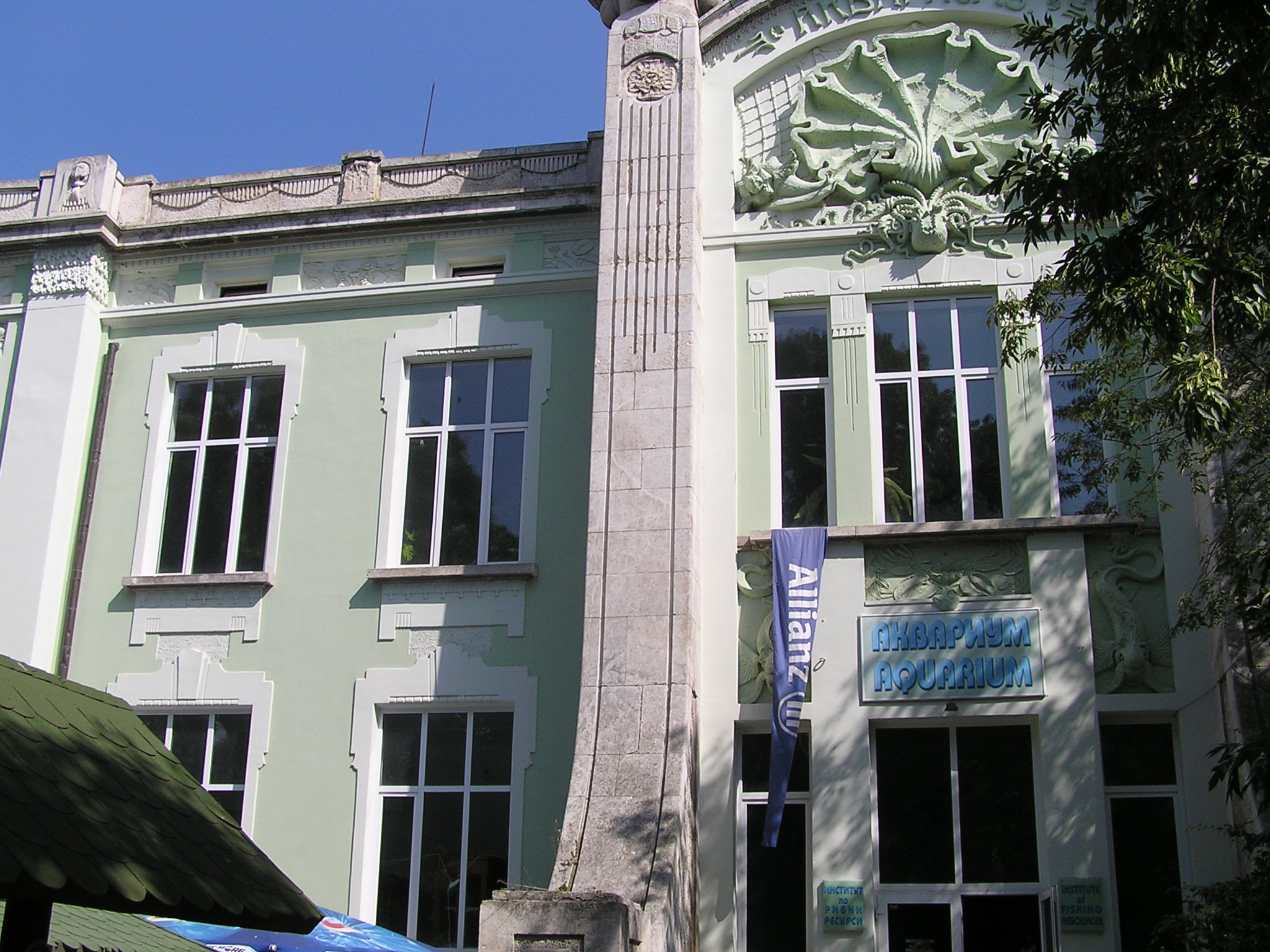
- Varna Aquarium
- Interactive map of Varna Aquarium
- 43°12′05″N 27°55′21″E
- Date opened: 1932
- Location: Varna, Bulgaria
- Website: www.ifrvarna.com

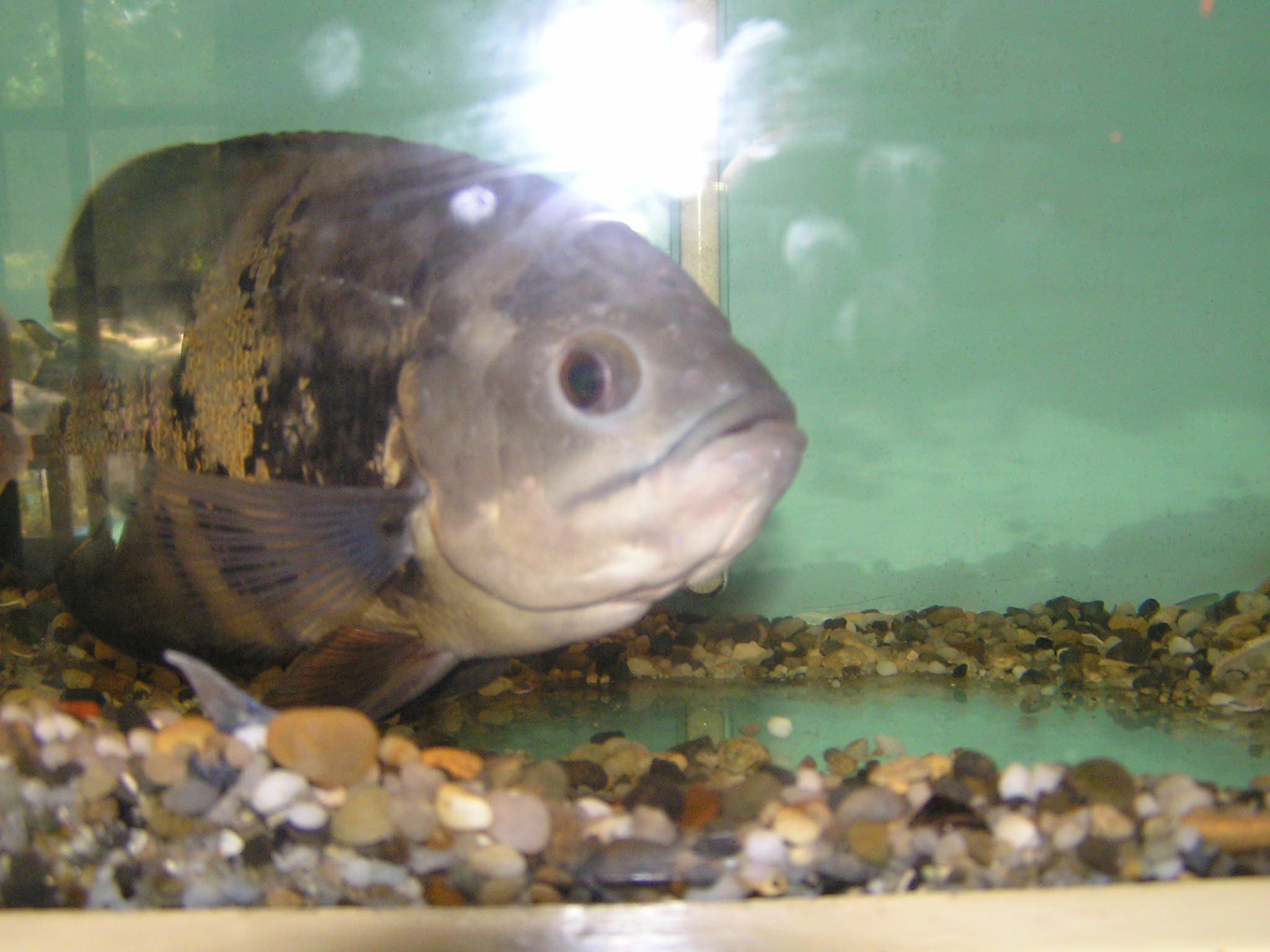
Live fish in the aquarium's exhibition

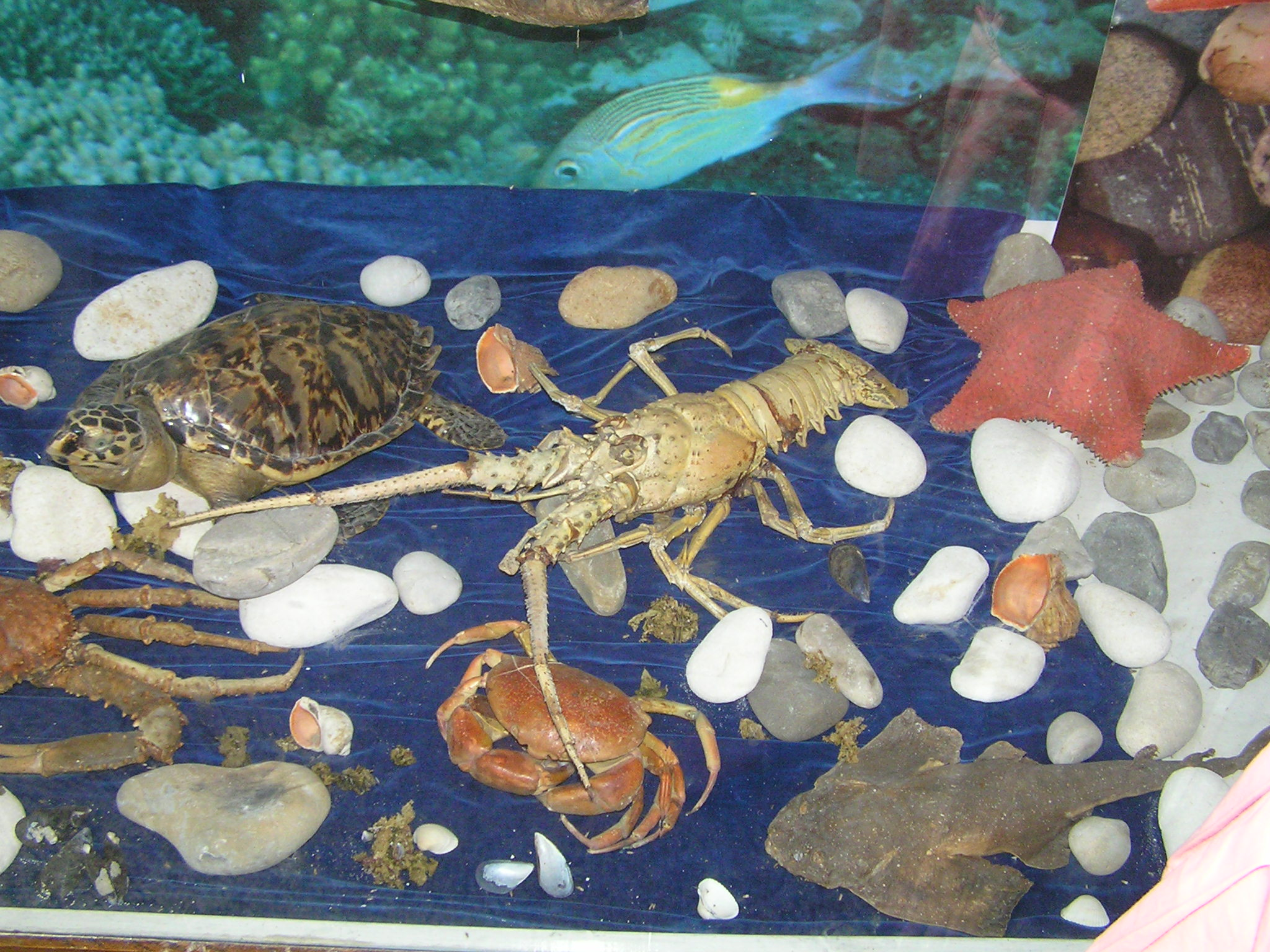
Stuffed exhibits in the aquarium

The Varna Aquarium (Bulgarian: Варненски аквариум, Varnenski akvarium) or Aquarium Varna (Аквариум Варна) is a public aquarium in Varna, Bulgaria's largest city on the Black Sea coast.

The aquarium's exhibition focuses on the Black Sea's flora and fauna which includes over 140 fish species, but also features freshwater fish, Mediterranean fish, exotic species from faraway areas of the World Ocean, mussels and algae.

The foundation of the aquarium was initiated by Prince Ferdinand I on 6 January 1906 in the Euxinograd palace. Ferdinand entrusted Doctor Parashkev Stoyanov with the establishment of a maritime biological station. The monarch also requested assistance from the prominent German biologist Anton Dohrn, founder of the Stazione Zoologica in Naples, who provided Ferdinand with blueprints and photographs of the Naples station. On 25 January 1906, the Varna Municipal Council allotted money for the aquarium's construction and appointed a commission in order to select a suitable location for the building. The foundation stone was laid on 22 October the same year in Varna's Sea Garden in the presence of Prince Ferdinand and the Bulgarian royal family, as well as many important statesmen and intellectuals. The aquarium's edifice was constructed to the design of Munich-educated Varna architect Dabko Dabkov. The building's facade is decorated with a sizable bas-relief of a clam and smaller reliefs of popular Black Sea species.

The edifice was completed by 1911. However, the outbreak of the Balkan Wars in 1912 delayed the opening of the aquarium. In 1913, Ferdinand made the building property of Sofia University. World War I and the severe sanctions imposed on Bulgaria with the Treaty of Neuilly did not permit the unveiling of the aquarium until 1932, when the maritime biological station was inaugurated by Tsar Boris III. Until 1932, the building had accommodated army units, Bulgarian refugees from Thrace, the School of Mechanics and the School of Fishing.

Today, the aquarium's research unit, the adjoined Institute for Fish Resources, includes 12 scientists who conduct research related to hydrobiology, hydrochemistry, marine microbiology, ichthyology, plankton and benthos. The Varna Aquarium's library houses 30,000 volumes of specialized literature, including rare 19th-century books and maps.
