= Sea Garden (Varna) =

Public Park

Coordinates: 43°12′41″N 27°56′22″E

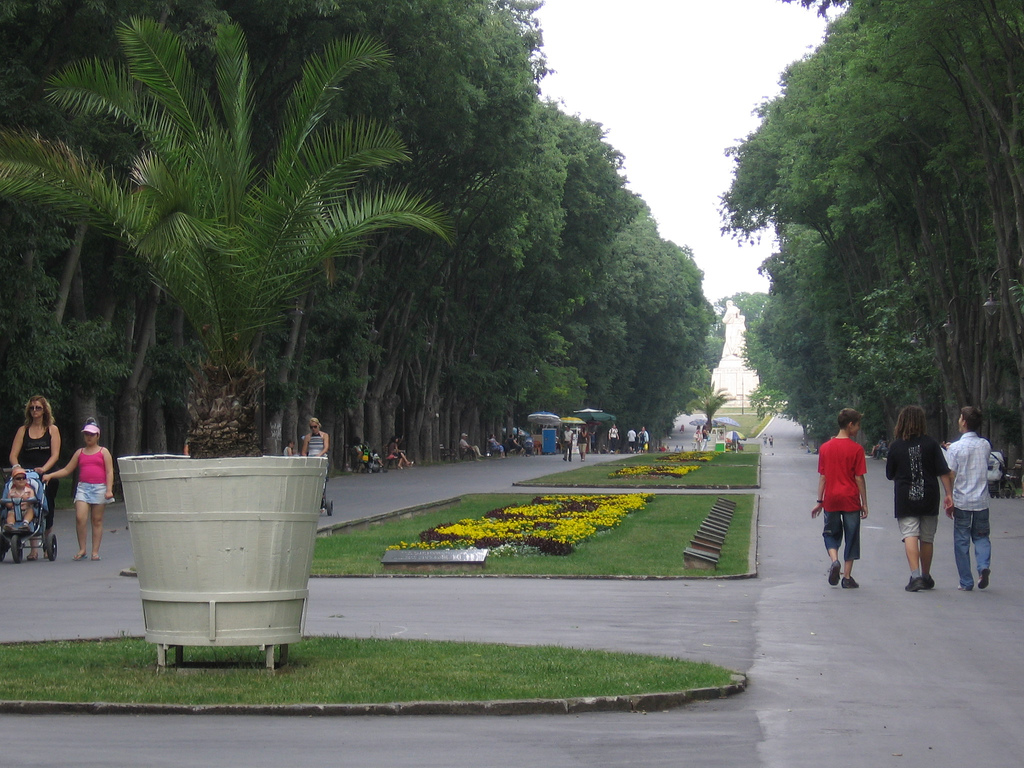
An alley in the Sea Garden in Varna, Bulgaria

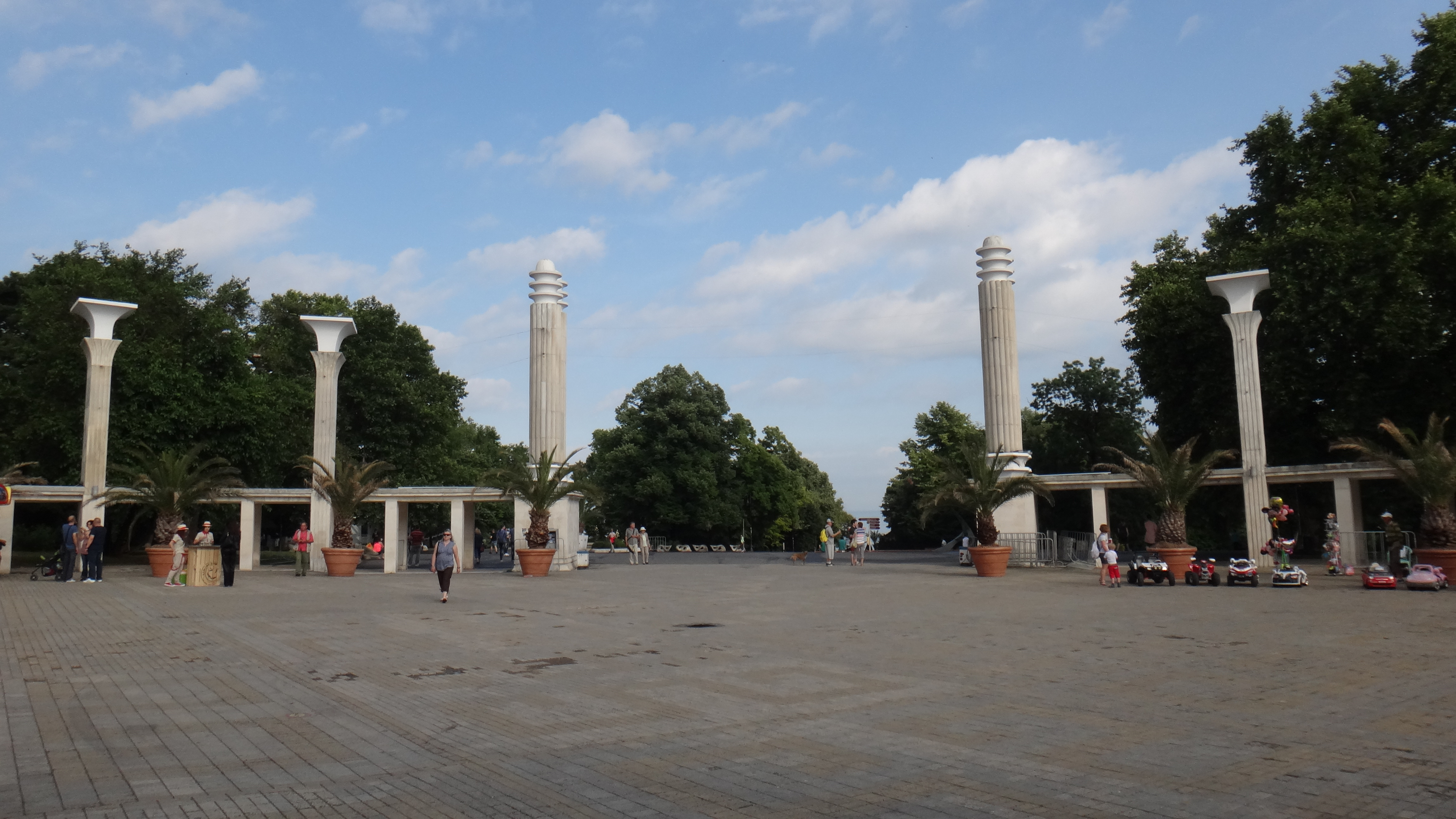
Main entrance gateway of the Sea Garden

The Sea Garden (Bulgarian: Морска градина, romanized: Morska gradina), or formally the Seaside Park (Bulgarian: Приморски парк, romanized: Primorski park) is the Bulgarian port city of Varna's largest, oldest and best known public park, also said to be the largest landscaped park in the Balkans. Located along the city's coast on the Black Sea, it is an important tourist attraction and a national monument of landscape architecture.

== History ==
The site where today the Sea Garden is located was until the middle of the 19th century a bare field outside the city walls. In 1862 a small garden was arranged on the orders of the city's Ottoman mayor. After the Liberation of Bulgaria in 1878 mayor Mihail Koloni suggested the arrangement of a city garden and a seaside park in 1881, and despite suspicions a small sum was granted. As a result, the Sea Garden was expanded to 26,000 m^{2} and further developed according to the plan of French engineer Martinice.

The person primarily associated and regarded as having done most for the garden's modern appearance is the Czech gardener Anton Novák, who had specialized at the Schönbrunn and Belvedere palaces in Vienna, Austria-Hungary. He was invited to work in Varna by his compatriot Karel Škorpil at the request of the municipality in 1894 and arrived in 1895, at the age of 35. One of Varna's best known buildings, the Varna Aquarium, was constructed in the garden in 1906–1911.

During his time in Varna Novák did an immense work: he radically rearranged the garden and ordered the planting of valued plants from the Black Sea and the Mediterranean. His contract with the municipality was extended in 1899, when he was built a house still standing next to the entrance to the garden. The garden gradually grew to reach 90,000 m^{2} in 1905. Several fountains were added in 1912–1913, as well as partially electric lighting. The central alley was decorated with monuments of prominent Bulgarians by a special committee. The seaside casino was built in the 1930s and acquired its modern appearance after a reconstruction in 1960–1961.

The 1930s saw the planting of species from the Netherlands, Germany, the Czech Republic and France, as well as the construction of nursery gardens. The garden was expanded to the south to reach the house of the Italian consul Assaretto, today the Varna Naval Museum. The garden reached its present borders in the 1950s and the trees in the centre of the central alley were substituted with flower beds in the 1960s, which thus reached 20,000 m^{2} in the entire Sea Garden. In 1939, the architect Georgi Popov designed the garden's modern central entrance with a wide plaza and tall columns.

An Alley of Cosmonauts was arranged in the 1960s, with the first cosmonaut Yuri Gagarin planting the first plant, a silver fir, on 26 May 1961 before a large crowd. The Pantheon of the Perished in the Fight Against Fascism was erected in the same year. The Observatory and Planetarium were opened in 1968 on the site of the old open-air theatre and the Varna Zoo was inaugurated in 1961. A swan-shaped sundial was installed in front of the main entrance. The present open-air theatre, flanked by the Alpineum and the children's amusement park, is the venue of the Varna International Ballet Competition since its inception in 1964, and the dolphinarium was erected in 1984. Recently, the Exotic Zoo terrarium was added, and plans for expansion of the Natural History Museum and the Aquarium were announced. In the park you could also visit the Naval Museum where you could find an interesting display of historic naval objects such as the famous Bulgarian Drazki torpedo boat.

The park is the favourite place for recreation and fun of the citizens of Varna. Apart from the long alleys for promenades, the sea coast with the beach and numerous restaurants, bars and clubs, one could also enjoy a swimming pool complex and a children's playing ground with mini-entertainment park and a small pond with boats. Just before the main alley of the garden is situated the so-called "bridge of wishes"- a small bridge which is believed to fulfil wishes if you cross it walking backwards and with your eyes closed.

== Gallery ==
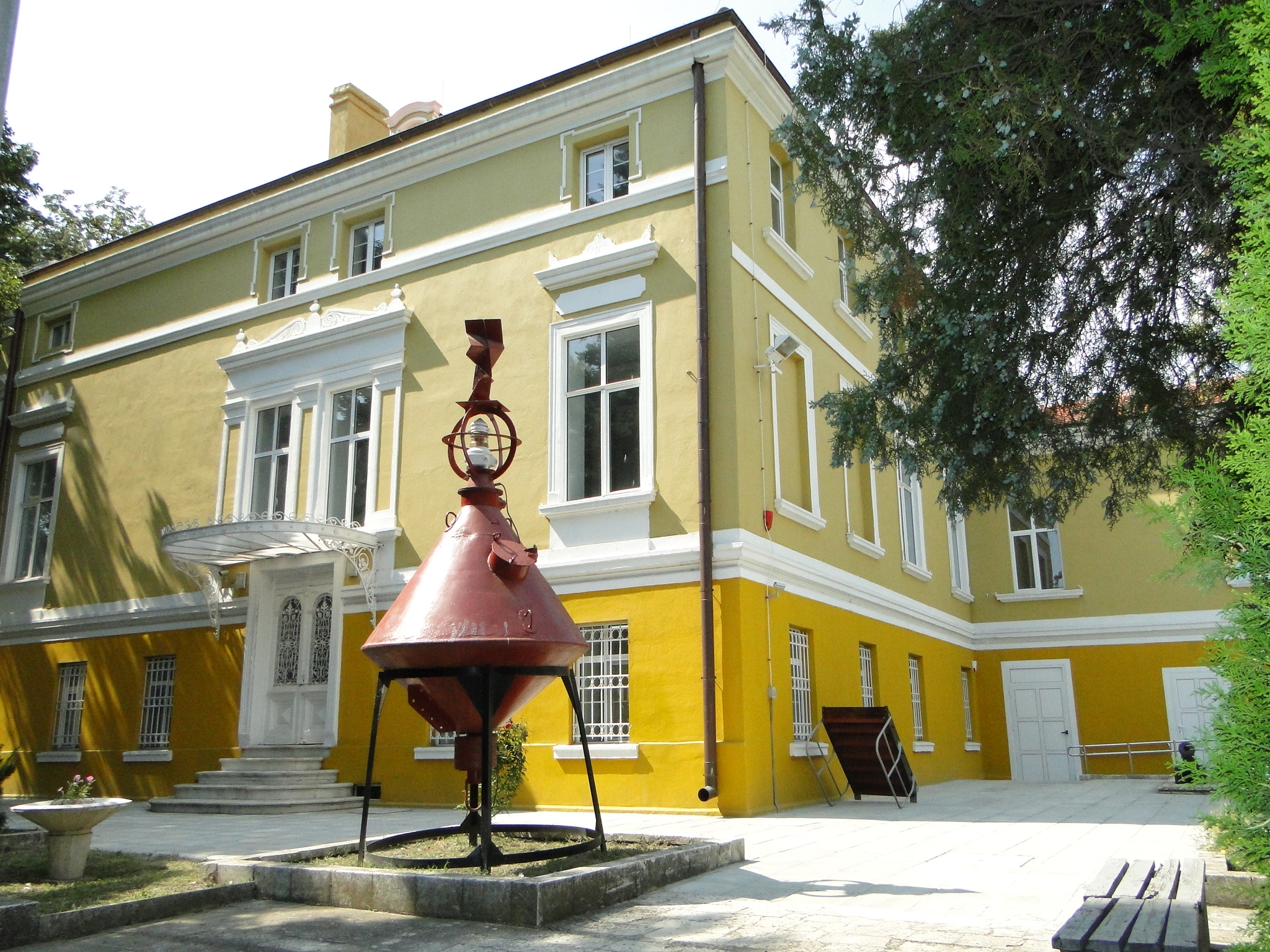
Building of the Naval Museum

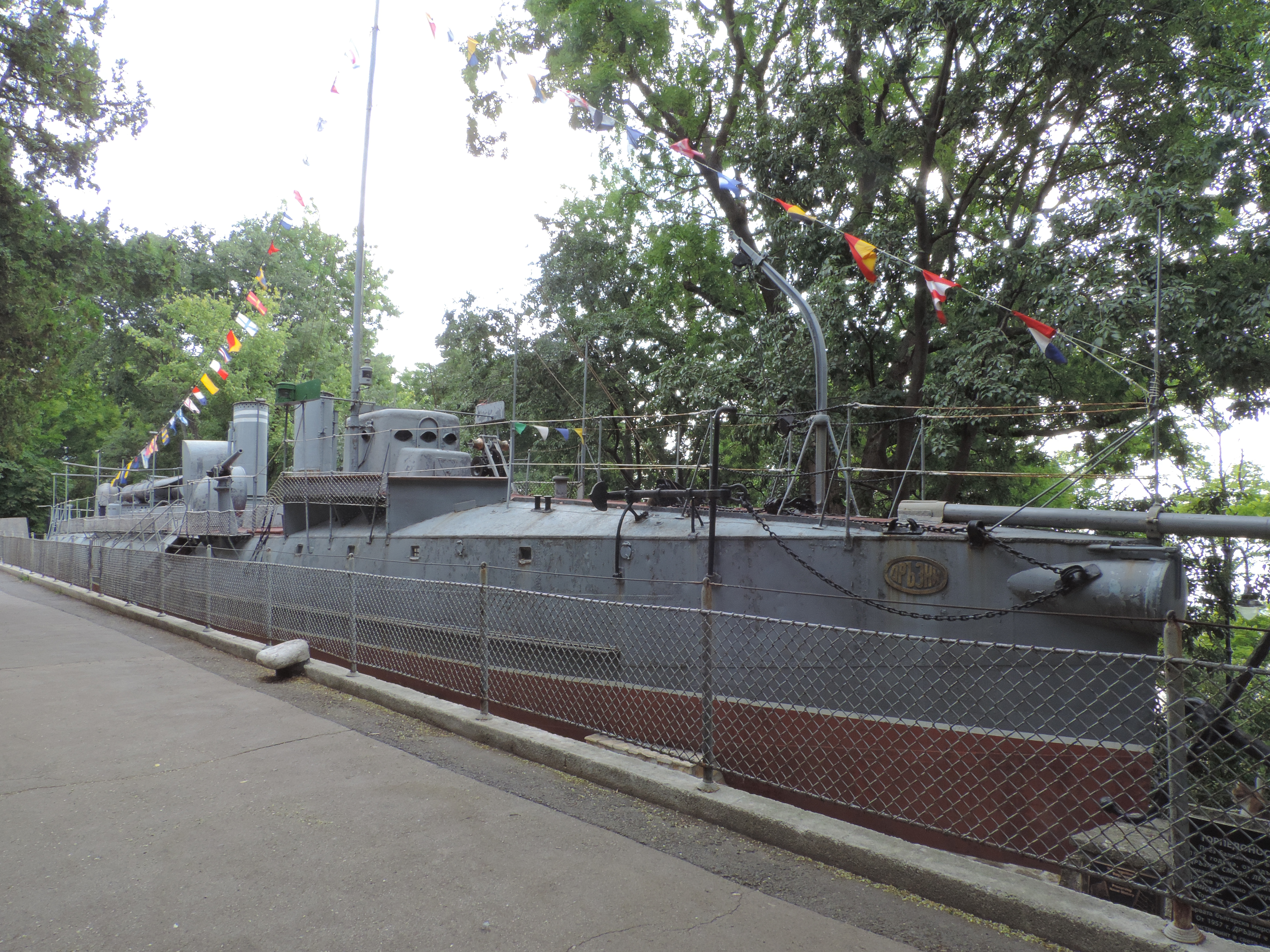
Bulgarian torpedo boat Drazki outside the Naval Museum

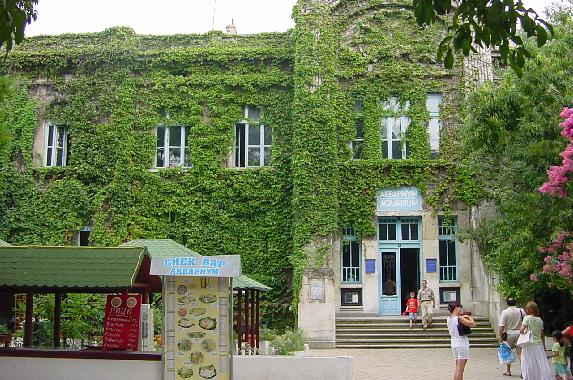
Exterior of the Aquarium

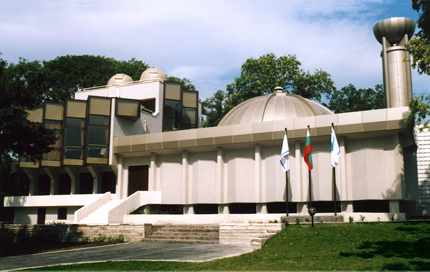
The Planetarium-Observatory

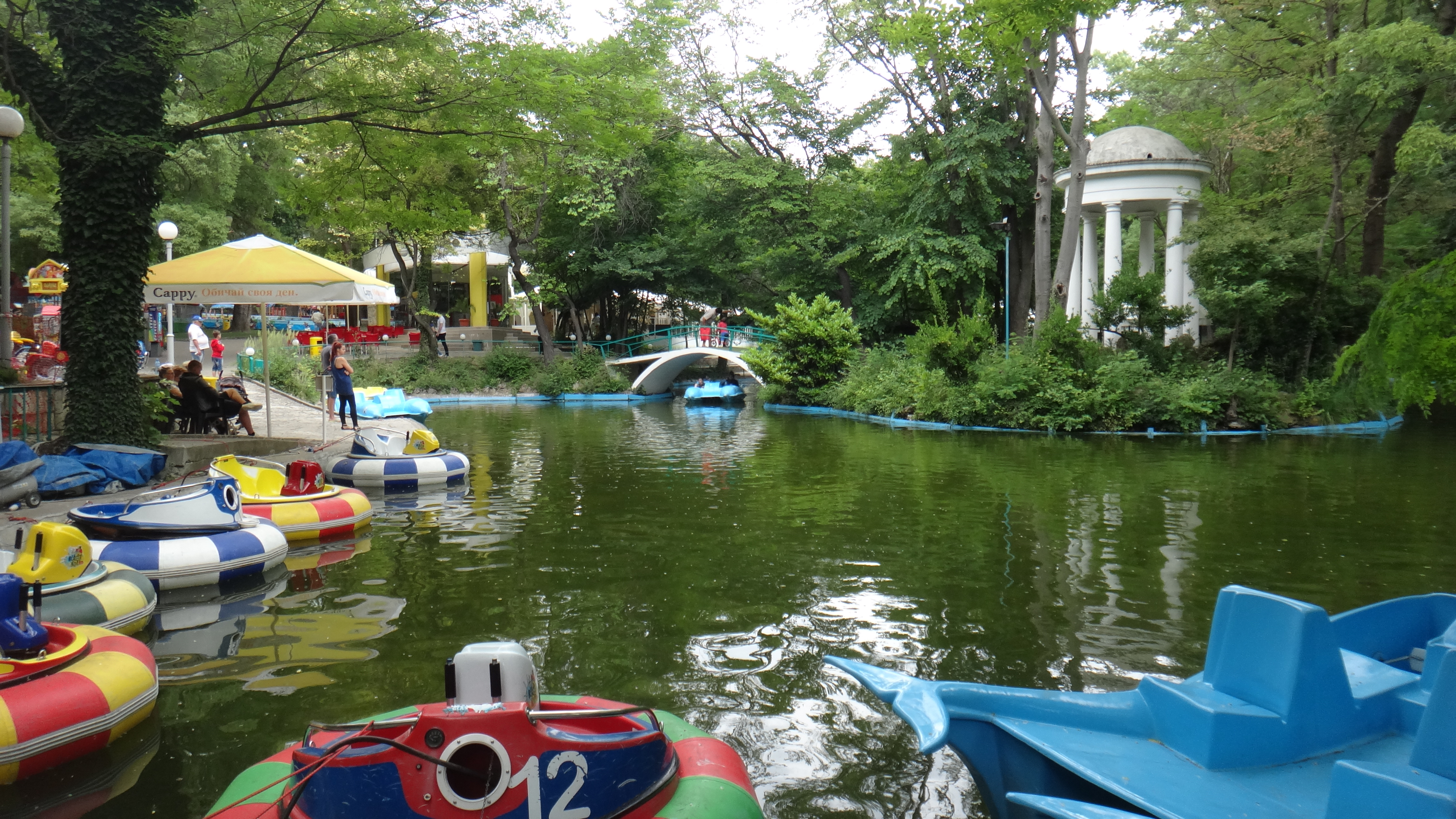
Bumper boats pond in the children's corner

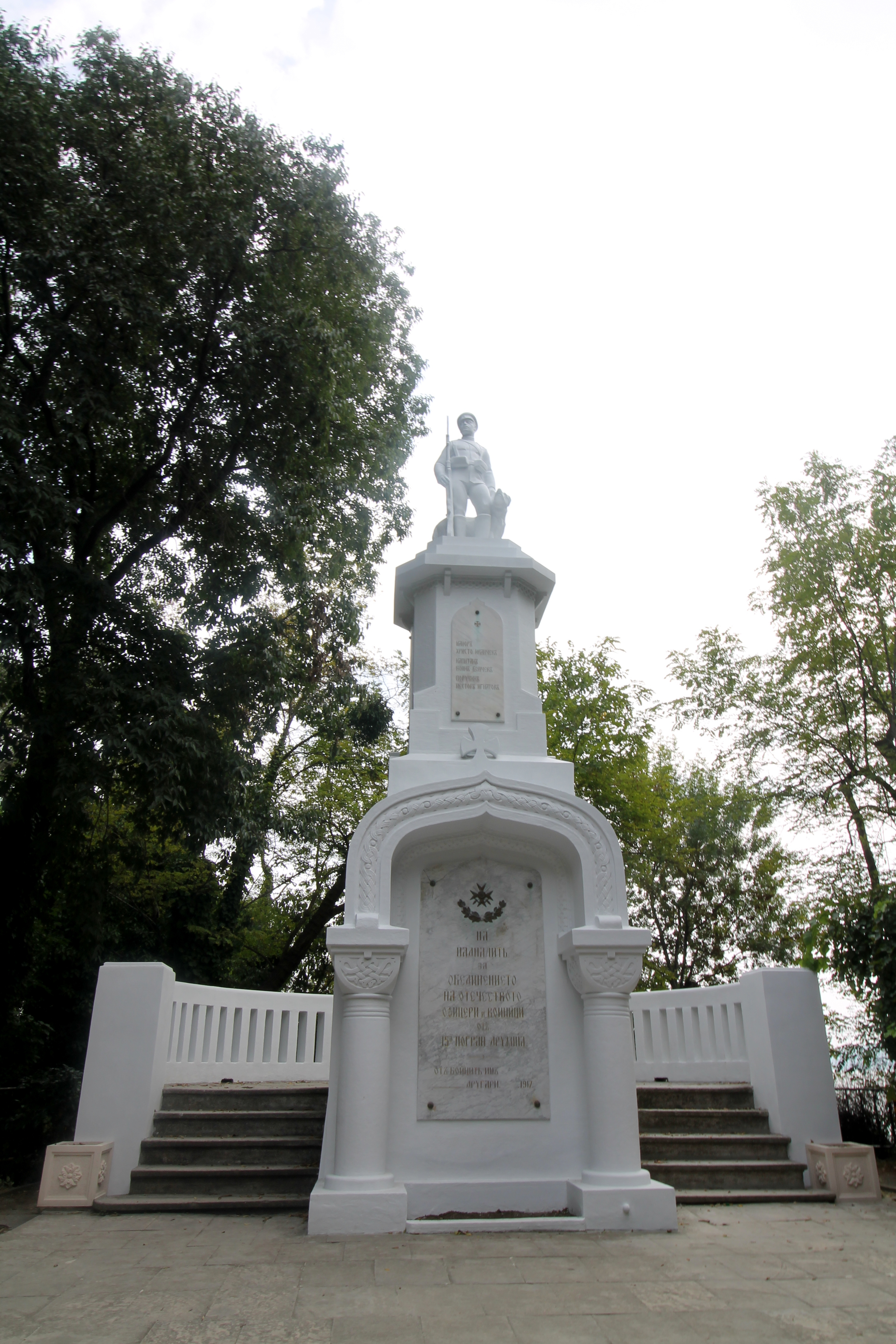
Border Guards Monument, built 1917–1922

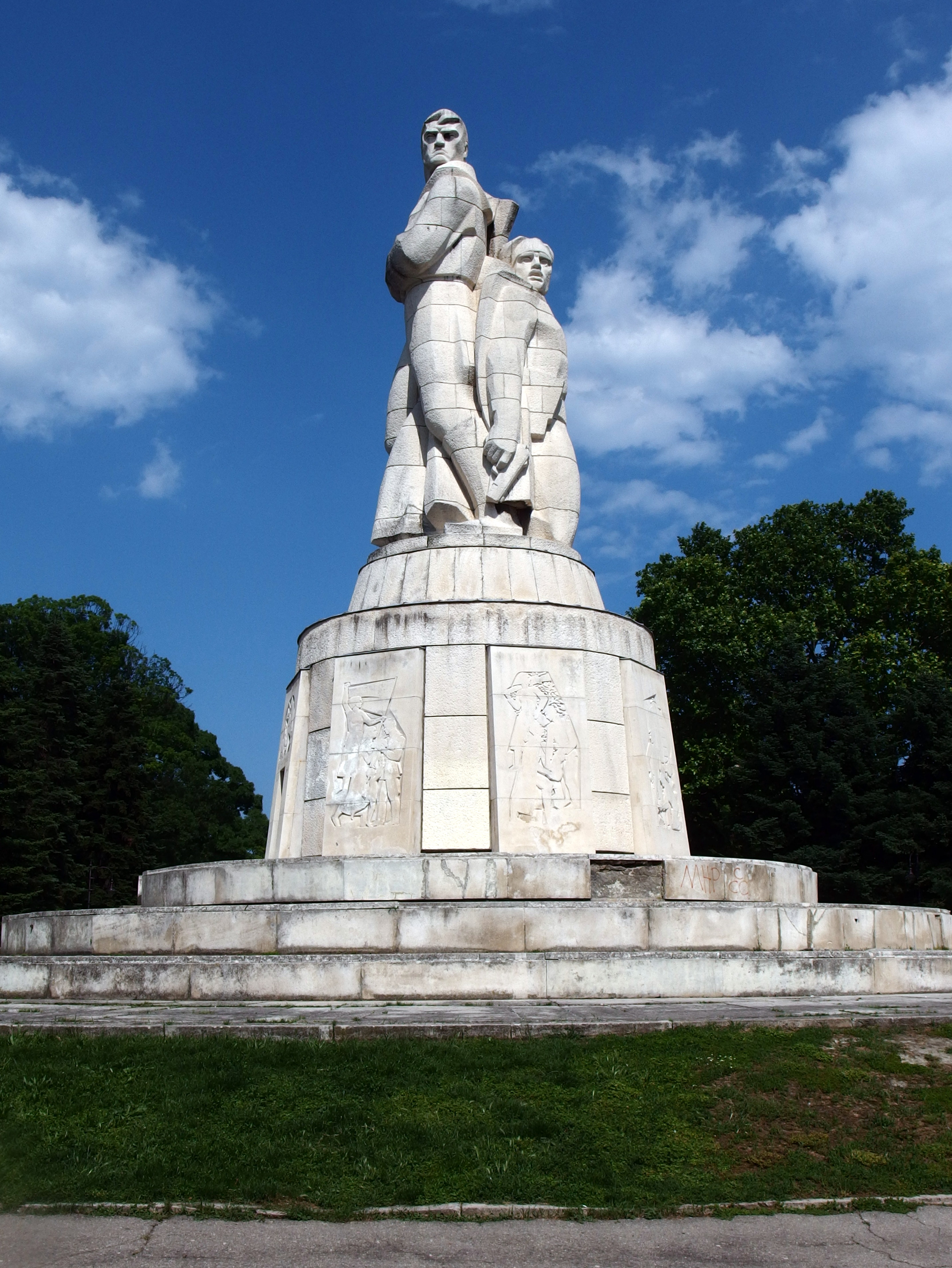
The Pantheon, commemorating Bulgarian anti-fascist (Communist) fighters who died between 1923 and 1944
