= Viktor Rumpelmayer =

Austro-Hungarian architect

Viktor Rumpelmayer (7 November 1830 – 14 June 1885) was a 19th-century Austro-Hungarian architect, whose style was a combination of French and Italian influences and the Viennese trends characteristic for the period. He is regarded as one of the most eminent Central European architects of his time.

== Life ==
Born in Pozsony, Kingdom of Hungary (today Bratislava, Slovakia), Rumpelmayer worked not only in his home country, but also in Bulgaria, where he designed and constructed the Neo-Baroque royal palace of Bulgaria (today the National Art Gallery) and Knyaz Alexander Battenberg's summer palace Euxinograd, on the Black Sea coast. Among his other works are a number of palaces for well-known members of the nobility, the Embassy of the United Kingdom in Vienna with Christ Church, the German embassy in Vienna the Portuguese pavilion at the Paris Exposition Universelle (1900), among other prominent commissions Rumpelmayer also redesigned the Festetics Palace in Keszthely, Hungary.

Rumpelmayer died on 14 June 1885 in Vienna.

== Gallery ==
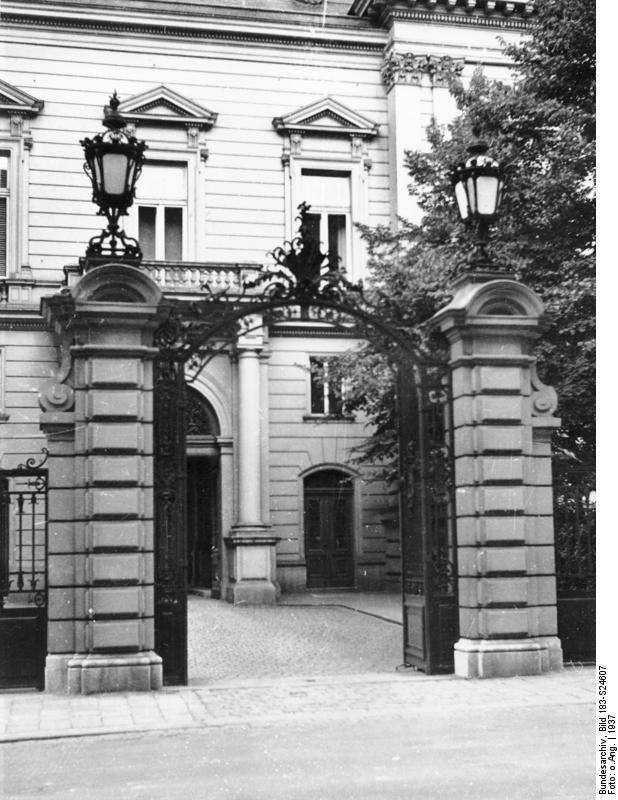
German Embassy of Vienna, Landstraße

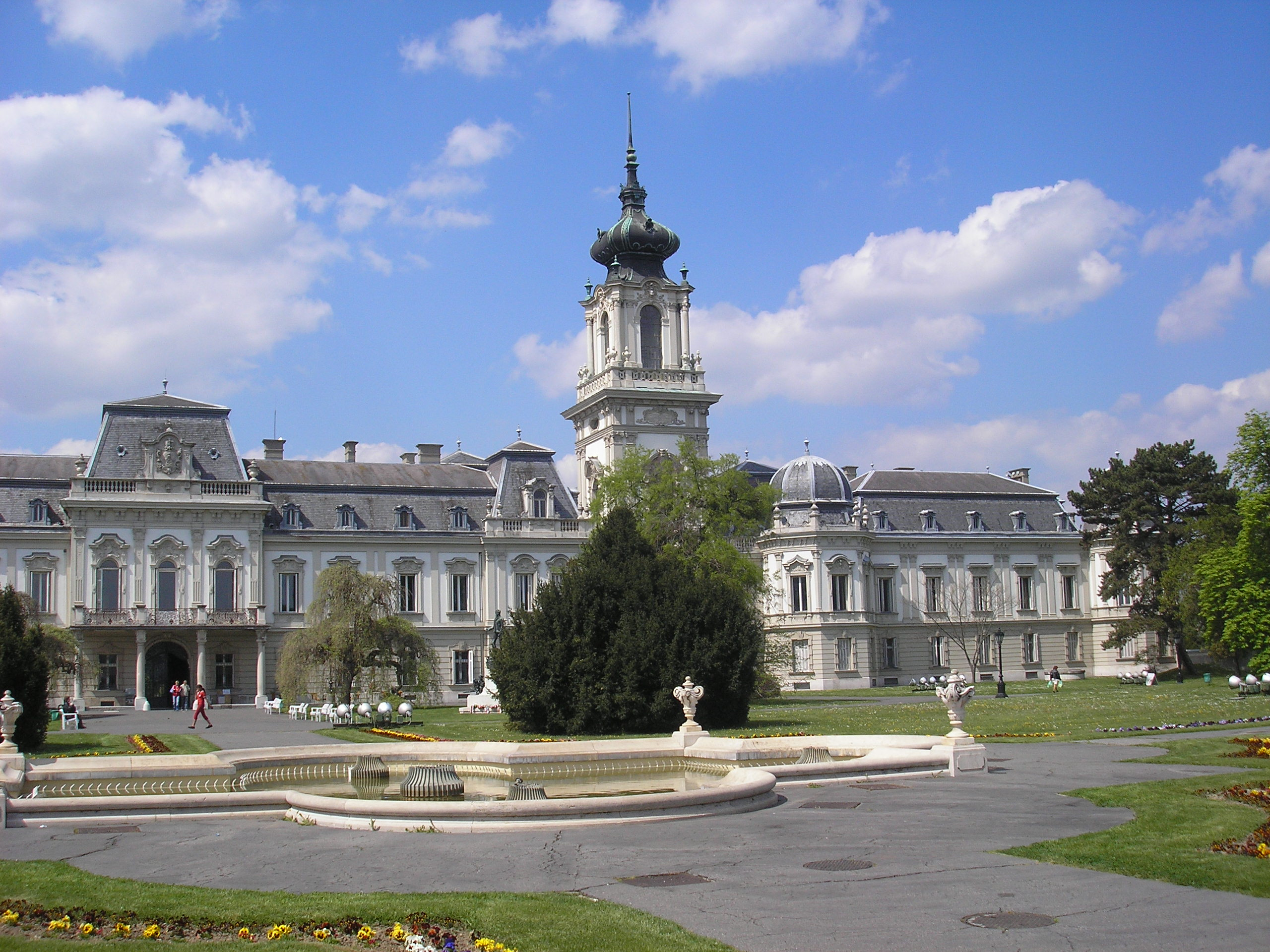
Festetics Castle

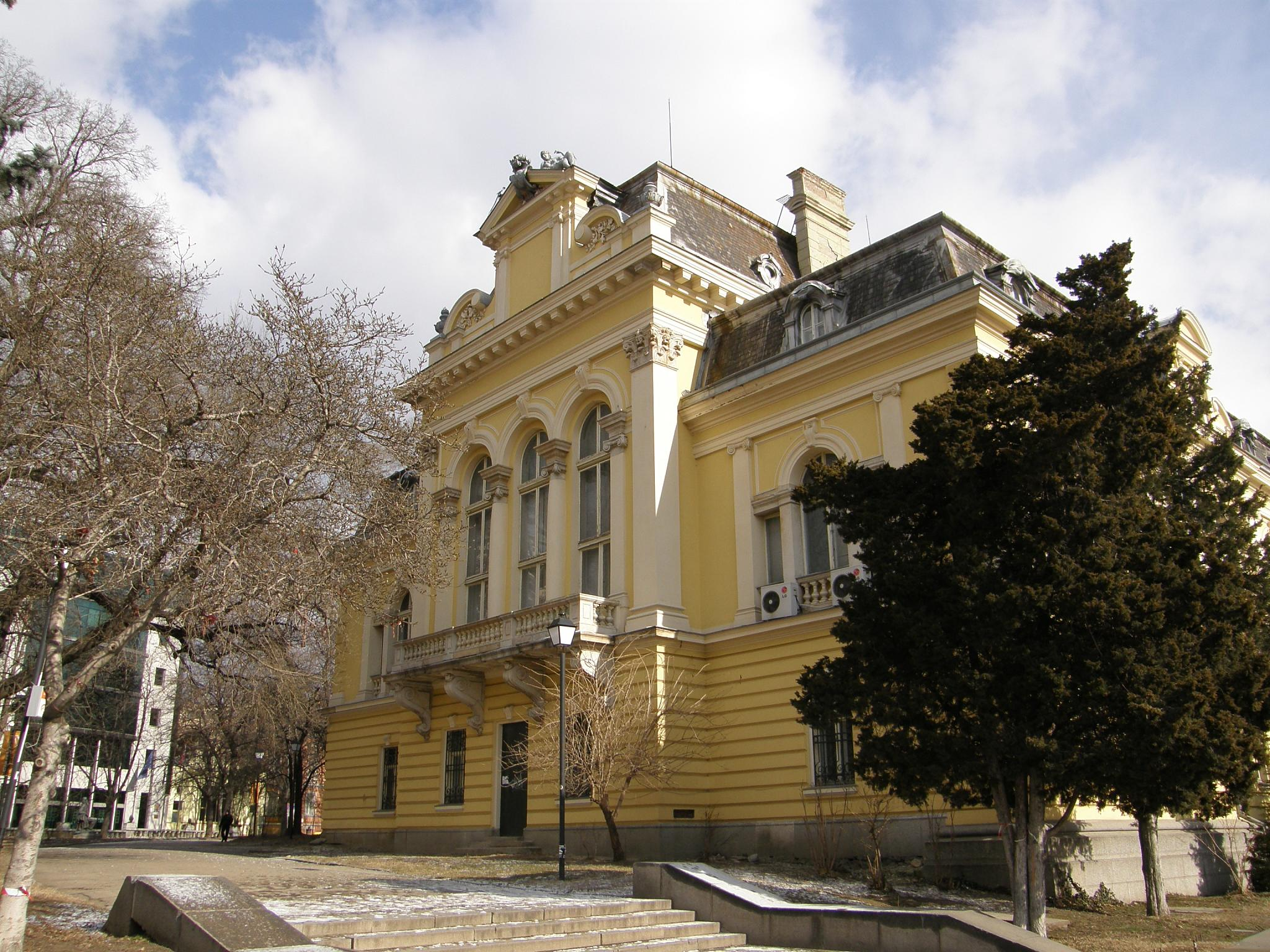
Former Bulgarian royal palace, Sofia

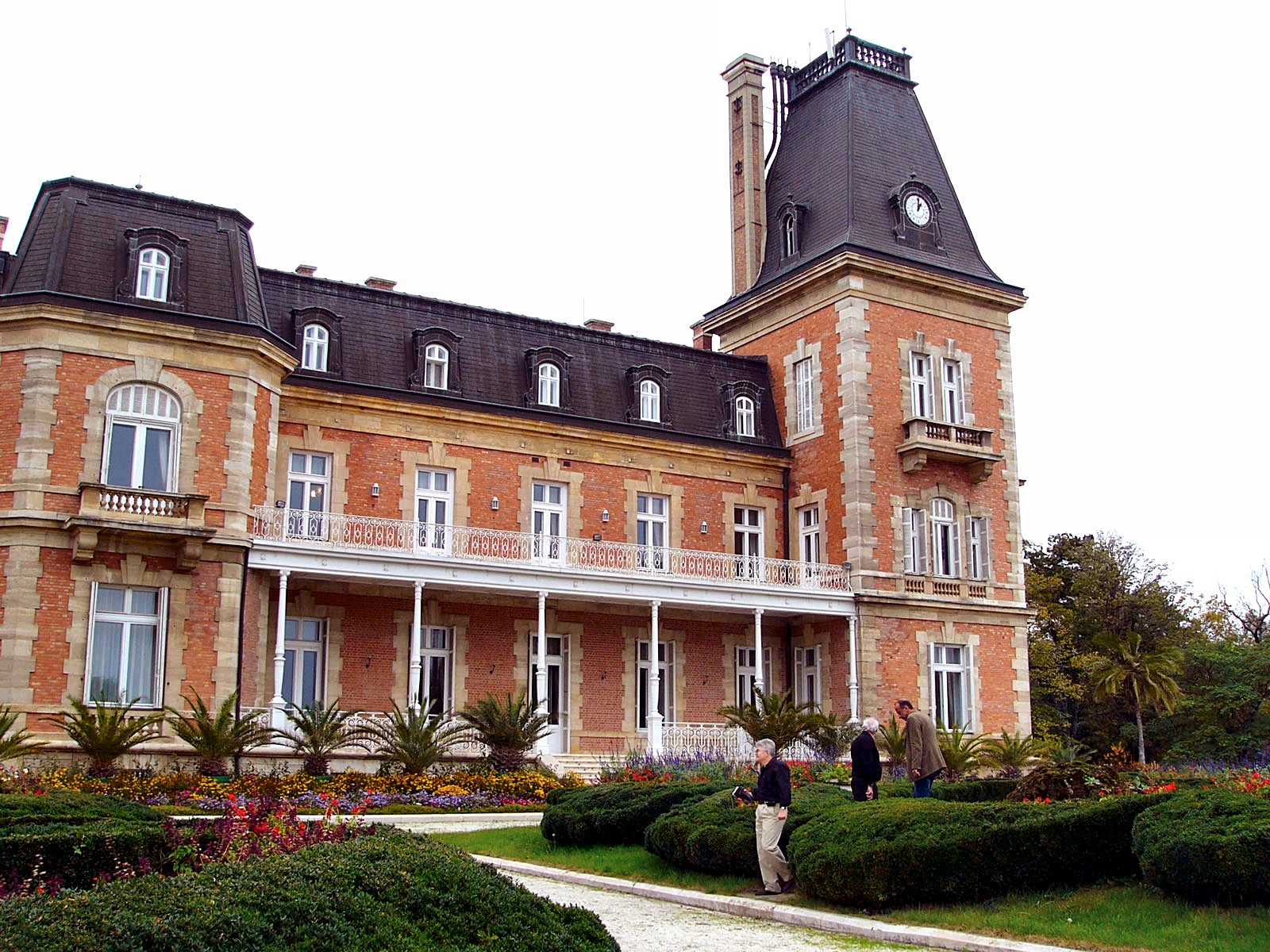
Euxinograd

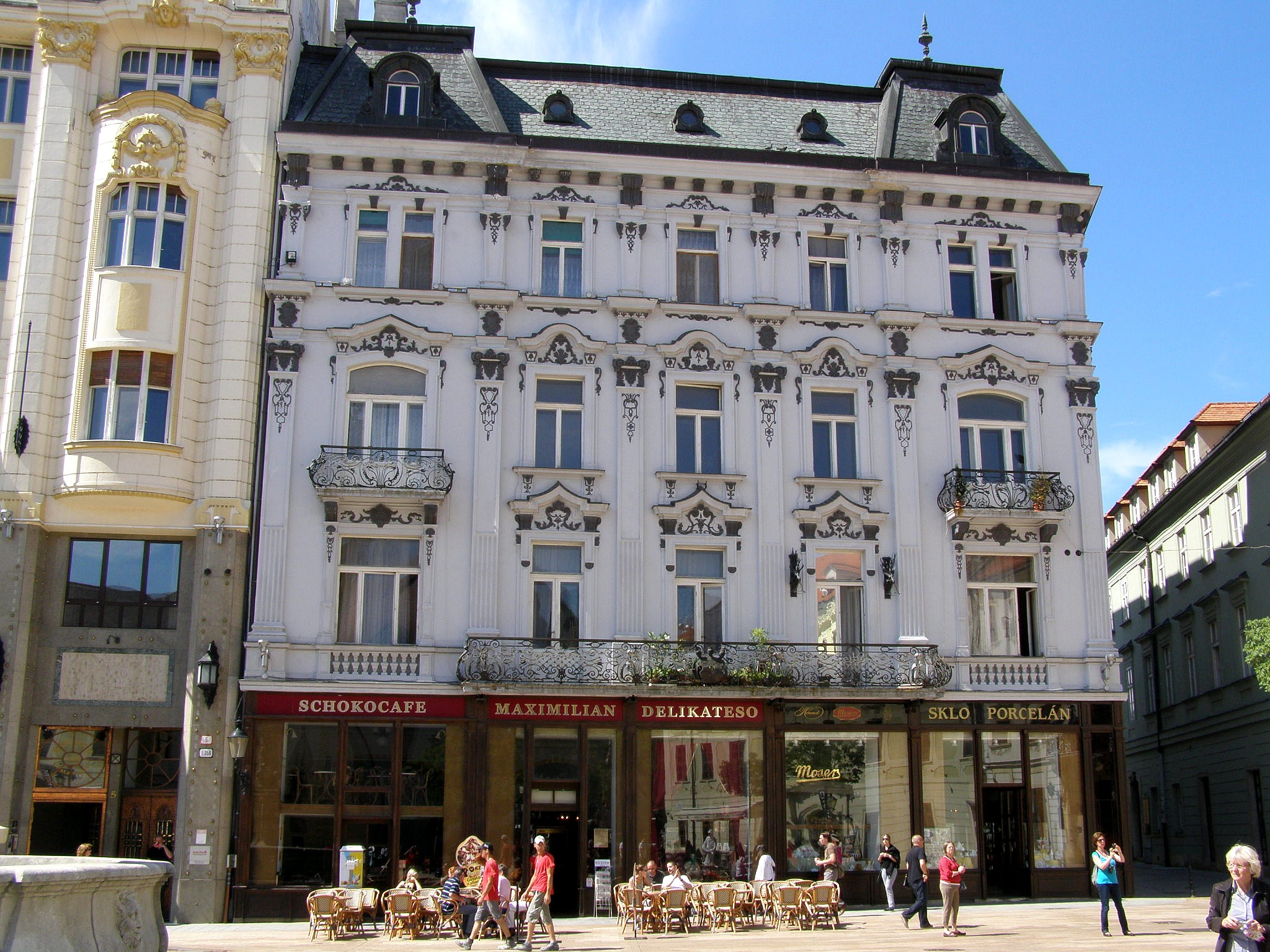
Palugyay Palace, Hlavné námestie (Bratislava), 1882–1883
