= Varna Zoo =

- Interactive map of Varna Zoo
- 43.2106420°N 27.9371434°E
- Date opened: 30 April 1961; 65 years ago
- Location: Sea Garden (Varna); Varna, Bulgaria
- Land area: 6 acres
- No. of animals: 300
- No. of species: 60
- Annual visitors: 100,000
- Major exhibits: Birds, Herbivore animals, Carnivore animals, Primates
- Website: Varna Zoo

Varna Zoo is located within the Sea Garden in Varna, Bulgaria. It is neighbouring the Dolphinarium and the Museum of Natural History. The first animals in the zoo were the bear 'Maxim', a gift from sailors of the minesweeper "G. Dimitrov" in 1956, and the red deer 'Longos'. Today the zoo houses 60 species of animals, with more than 300 individuals, of which 17 protected species of animals, written in the Red Book of Bulgaria for protected species.

== History ==
Varna Zoo was built between 1958-1961 and opened on 30 April 1961. Architect Bistra Markova laid out the animal houses together with K. Karakashev and with the support from the major at that time, Nikolay Boyadzhiev.

Until the bear house was built in 1958, the bear Maxim had been tied to a tree. The lakes were populated with Rose pelicans. By 1974, the zoo received animals from the Sofia Zoo and foreign zoos, including kangaroos, lamas, panthers, penguins, swans from Berlin and other. By 1994 there were around 50 animal species. The oldest animals were Martin, a 24-years old camel, and the bears Martin and Marga, born in 1972.

== Recent development ==
Since 2007 the zoo is acting as an animal rescue centre and by 2013 more than 100 protected birds had been cured and returned to their natural habitat with the support of other local institutions.
