= Operosa =

Annual music festival

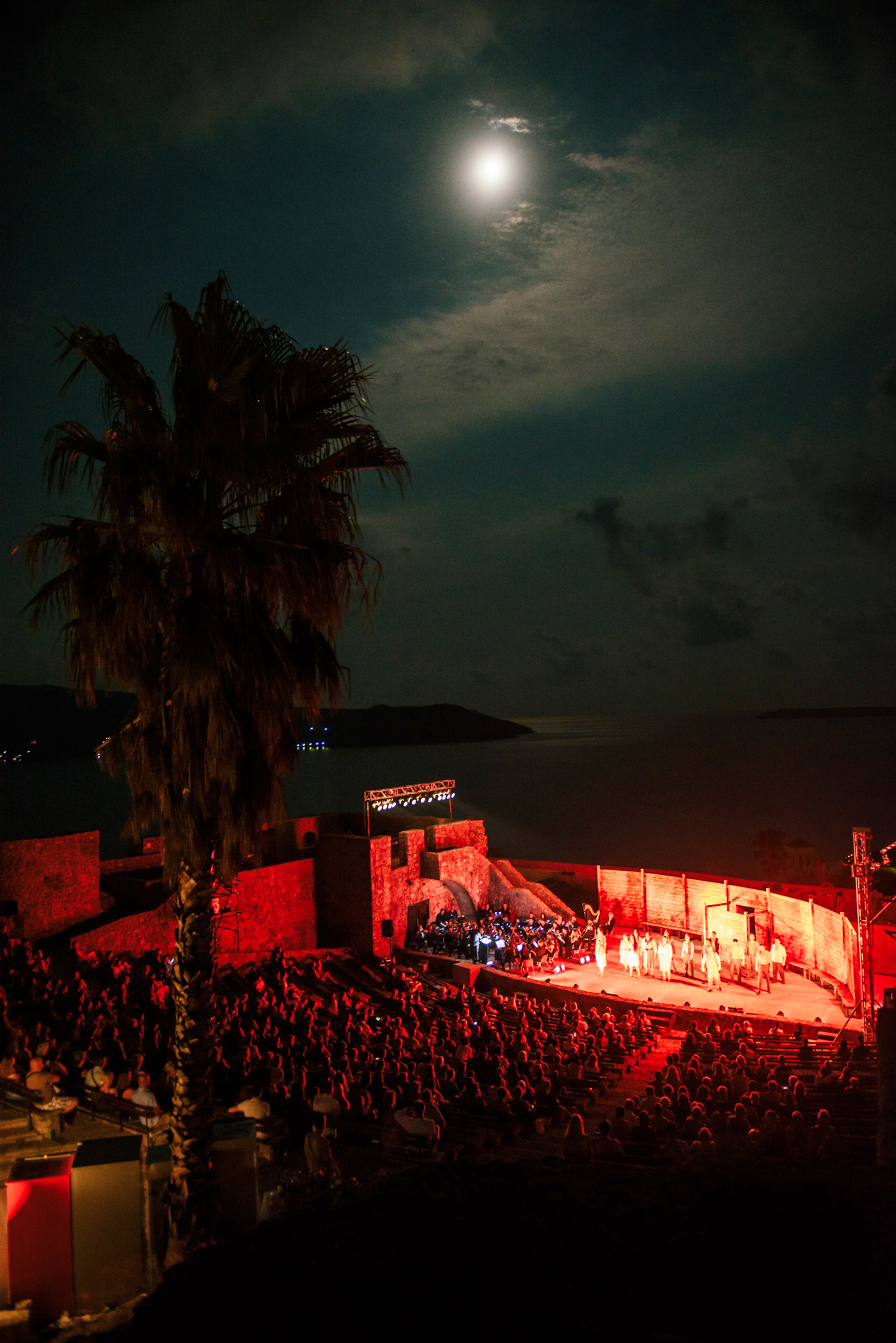
Operosa Montenegro Opera Festival in Fortress Kanli Kula, Herceg Novi, Montenegro

Operosa is an annual classical music and opera festival, and opera academy Devoted mainly to opera, it also features orchestral, chamber, vocal and solo instrumental music. Operosa has been active in the Balkan region with the main festival event in Herceg Novi and the opera academy in Cetinje in Montenegro.

== History ==
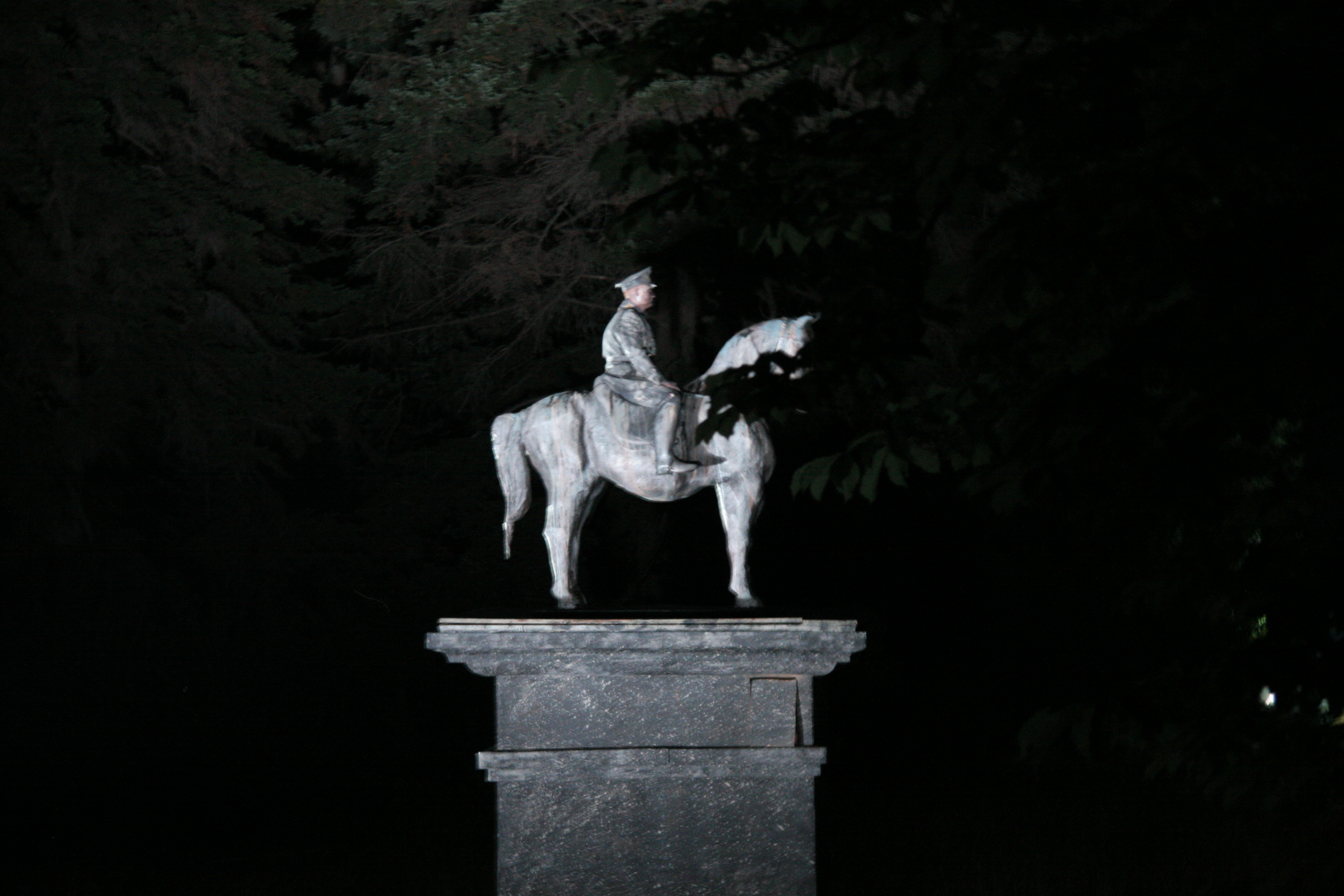
Photograph of the background sets at Operosa Evxinograd 2007 Don Giovanni performance.

Operosa was founded by Finnish mezzo-soprano Katherine Haataja in 2006. It was founded with the purpose of supporting and promoting young opera and classical music talent and actively providing accredited vocational training and production work opportunities to young artists. The first open air opera festival was launched in June 2007 in Varna, Bulgaria in the open air of the Euxinograd castle garden with the opera Don Giovanni by W.A. Mozart. The following year festival performances were held in Sofia at the Ivan Vazov National Theatre. Operosa returned to Euxinograd in 2009 and 2010 with performances of La Voix Humaine by Francis Poulenc, and Roméo et Juliette by Charles Gounod.

In 2011 Operosa produced opera performances in Belgrade in Serbia at the Belgrade Youth Center. It was the first time an opera was performed at the center. 2012 was dedicated to baroque opera with workshops, master classes and performances of Pimpinone opera by Georg Philipp Telemann at the Ilija M. Kolarac Endowment in Belgrade in Serbia as well as at Betahaus in Sofia, Bulgaria. In 2013 Operosa participated at the Night of Culture event in Herceg Novi in Montenegro for the first time with a staged performance of La Voix Humaine by Francis Poulenc. The following year in September 2014 Operosa produced an international full-scale opera performance of Roméo et Juliette by Charles Gounod. Since, the Operosa Montenegro Opera Festival has taken place in the Old Town, the Forte Mare and the Kanli Kula Fortress open air amphitheater in Herceg Novi, as well as Mamula Island in Montenegro.

A dedicated educational program (Operosa Academia) was initiated in 2012 and has been active in Bulgaria, Serbia and Montenegro. Since 2024 the Operosa Opera Academy is active in Cetinje in Montenegro. In cooperation with the University of Montenegro Music Academy, it provides training for young opera and classical music artists with master classes and workshops, and since 2026 vocational opera performance courses in cooperation with Music Academies around the world for undergraduate and post-graduate students. Operosa also supports young artists with awards and stipends.

Operosa has collaboration and exchange schemes with international opera establishments such as Aix-en-Provence Festival, Queen Elisabeth Music Chapel, Aldeburgh Music Helsinki Festival, La Monnaie, Dutch National Opera and Calouste Gulbenkian Foundation through institutions such as ENOA network of European opera academies.

In 2017 Operosa was selected for co-funding by the European Union programme for culture Creative Europe. The project YOUNG@OPERA was created by Operosa in cooperation with partners Herceg Novi municipality and Ilija M. Kolarac Endowment with performances across Montenegro, Serbia and Bulgaria.

== Artists ==
Artists who have performed and worked at Operosa include mezzo-soprano Jennifer Larmore, soprano Darina Takova, alto Marijana Mijanovic, mezzo-soprano Katherine Haataja, set designer Jamie Vartan, stage director John La Bouchardiere, stage director Martin Lloyd-Evans, stage director and designer Tim Hopkins, stage director Seth Yorra, stage director Ashley Dean, lighting and set designer Simon Corder, costume and set designer Domenico Franchi, set designer Cordelia Chisholm, lighting designer Kevin Treacy, organist and harpsichordist Jeremy Joseph, conductor Eraldo Salmieri, conductor Predrag Gosta, Sofia Symphonic Orchestra, Varna Philharmonic Society Chamber Orchestra and Montenegrin Symphony Orchestra

== Past productions ==
Operosa events take place every year around Montenegro as well as guest performances around the Balkan region. Since its inauguration performances have included the following productions:

- 2007: Don Giovanni by W.A. Mozart (Euxinograd, Varna, Bulgaria)
- 2008: Opera & Arabesque Ballet (Ivan Vazov National Theatre, Sofia, Bulgaria)
- 2009: La Voix Humaine by Francis Poulenc (Euxinograd, Varna, Bulgaria)
- 2010: Roméo et Juliette by Charles Gounod (Euxinograd, Varna, Bulgaria)
- 2011: La Voix Humaine by Francis Poulenc (Belgrade Youth Center, Belgrade, Serbia)
- 2012: Pimpinone by Georg Philipp Telemann (Ilija M. Kolarac Endowment, Belgrade, Serbia)
- 2012: Pimpinone by Georg Philipp Telemann (Betahaus, Sofia, Bulgaria)
- 2013: La Voix Humaine by Francis Poulenc (Night of Culture, Herceg Novi, Montenegro)
- 2014: Roméo et Juliette by Charles Gounod, Tivat, Montenegro)
- 2015: Cosi Fan Tutte by W.A. Mozart (Kanli Kula, Herceg Novi, Montenegro)
- 2015: Lo Speziale by Joseph Haydn (Studentski kulturni centar, Belgrade, Serbia)
- 2016: La Cenerentola by Gioachino Rossini (Kanli Kula, Herceg Novi, Montenegro)
- 2017: La Serva Padrona by Giovanni Battista Pergolesi (Studentski kulturni centar, Belgrade, Serbia)
- 2017: Iolanta by Pyotr Ilyich Tchaikovsky (Kanli Kula, Herceg Novi, Montenegro)
- 2018: La Serva Padrona by Giovanni Paisiello (Bansko, Sofia, Gabrovo and Pleven in Bulgaria)
- 2018: La Serva Padrona by Giovanni Paisiello (Herceg Novi, Kotor, Bar and Podgorica in Montenegro)
- 2018: Carmen by Georges Bizet (Kanli Kula, Herceg Novi, Montenegro)
- 2018: La Serva Padrona by Giovanni Paisiello (Pančevo, Šabac, Sombor and Belgrade in Serbia)
- 2019: Džumbus by Milica Ilić (Berkovica, Sofia, Chavdar and Montana in Bulgaria)
- 2019: Be My Superstar - A Contemporary Tragedy by Šimon Voseček and Alexandra Lacroix based on text by Yann Verburgh (Dvorana Park, Herceg Novi, Montenegro)
- 2019: A Midsummer Night's Dream (Mendelssohn) by Felix Mendelssohn (Kanli Kula, Herceg Novi, Montenegro)
- 2019: Džumbus Music by Milica Ilić, Text Jovan Stamatović-Karić (Herceg Novi, Bijelo polje and Berane in Montenegro)

== Other media ==
In 2007 Operosa released a recording named “Perle” under the label Orpheus Music. It features works by W.A. Mozart, G. Rossini, G.F. Handel, A. Vivaldi and Giulio Caccini performed by the Sofia Symphonic Orchestra together with conductor Nayden Todorov, mezzo-soprano Katherine Haataja, guitar by Rosen Balkanski and harpsichord by Magdalena Vasileva.

== See also ==
- List of opera festivals
- Euxinograd
- Varna
- Herceg Novi
- Kanli Kula
