= Martin Lloyd-Evans =

British opera stage director (born 1963)

Martin Lloyd-Evans (born 14 April 1963) is a British opera stage director. He grew up in Stratford Upon Avon and later moved and studied physics at Manchester University and theatre arts at Bretton Hall College.

== Work ==
Lloyd-Evans has directed operas including I gioielli della Madonna, Un Ballo in Maschera, La Gioconda, The Queen of Spades, Andrea Chenier, Gianni Schicchi, Le Nozze di Figaro, Stiffelio, L'amore dei tre re, Don Giovanni, Mitridate, Re di Ponto, Cosi fan tutte, A Midsummer Night's Dream, The Rape of Lucretia, Postcard from Morocco, The Beggar's Opera, La Bohème, Cenerentola, Carmen, The Barber of Seville, Cosi fan tutte and Romeo et Juliettefor opera companies such as Opera Holland Park, Buxton Festival, Essential Scottish Opera, Mid Wales Opera, Operosa and Classical Opera Company at Sadler's Wells Theatre. Together with fellow artists composer Jonny Pilcher and performer Andrew Dawson, Lloyd-Evans also developed the piece The Articulate Hand, which was featured on TEDMED. Along with his work as stage director, he is a resident producer at the Guildhall School of Music and Drama.
