= Dabko Dabkov =

Bulgarian architect

- Дабко Дабков
- Born: January 21, 1875; Tryavna, Ottoman Empire (now Bulgaria)
- Died: April 8, 1945 (aged 70); Varna, Kingdom of Bulgaria
- Citizenship: Bulgarian
- Education: Technical University of Munich
- Occupation: architect
- Years active: 1899–1941

Dabko Petrov Dabkov (Bulgarian: Дабко Петров Дабков; 21 January 1875–8 April 1945) was a Bulgarian architect who designed more than 350 buildings in the Black Sea port city of Varna between 1899 and 1941.

Dabkov was born in Tryavna. His family moved to Varna when he was a child and he finished a men's high school there. He graduated in architecture from the Technical University of Munich in 1899 and returned to Varna to start his practice as an architect.

Dabkov married Anna Yordanova, the daughter of a famous doctor, in 1906. He fought in the Balkan Wars and World War I and was twice elected to Varna's Municipal Council. After the 1944 Bulgarian coup d'état, he was declared a public enemy and his property was confiscated by the communist authorities. In 2016, a monument to the architect was raised in front of Hotel Musala.

Dabko Dabkov employed a wide variety of architectural styles. His earliest work, the Hristo Botev Cotton Factory of 1899, is an eclectic brick structure with a significant German influence. The Varna Aquarium is a notable example of Vienna Secession or Art Nouveau, whereas Grand Hotel London and Hotel Royal bear Neo-Baroque features. The Roman Catholic Church of Saint Archangel Michael is a mostly Neo-Gothic design. During his work on Grand Hotel Musala, Dabkov visited New York City to study the Flatiron Building and included Art Deco elements.

== Works ==
- Hristo Botev Cotton Factory (1899)
- Varna Aquarium (1906–1911)
- Grand Hotel London (1912)
- Hotel Royal (1922)
- Church of Saint Archangel Michael (1924)
- Grand Hotel Musala (1927)
- Bulgarian Navy Headquarters (1928), with Stefan Venedikt Popov
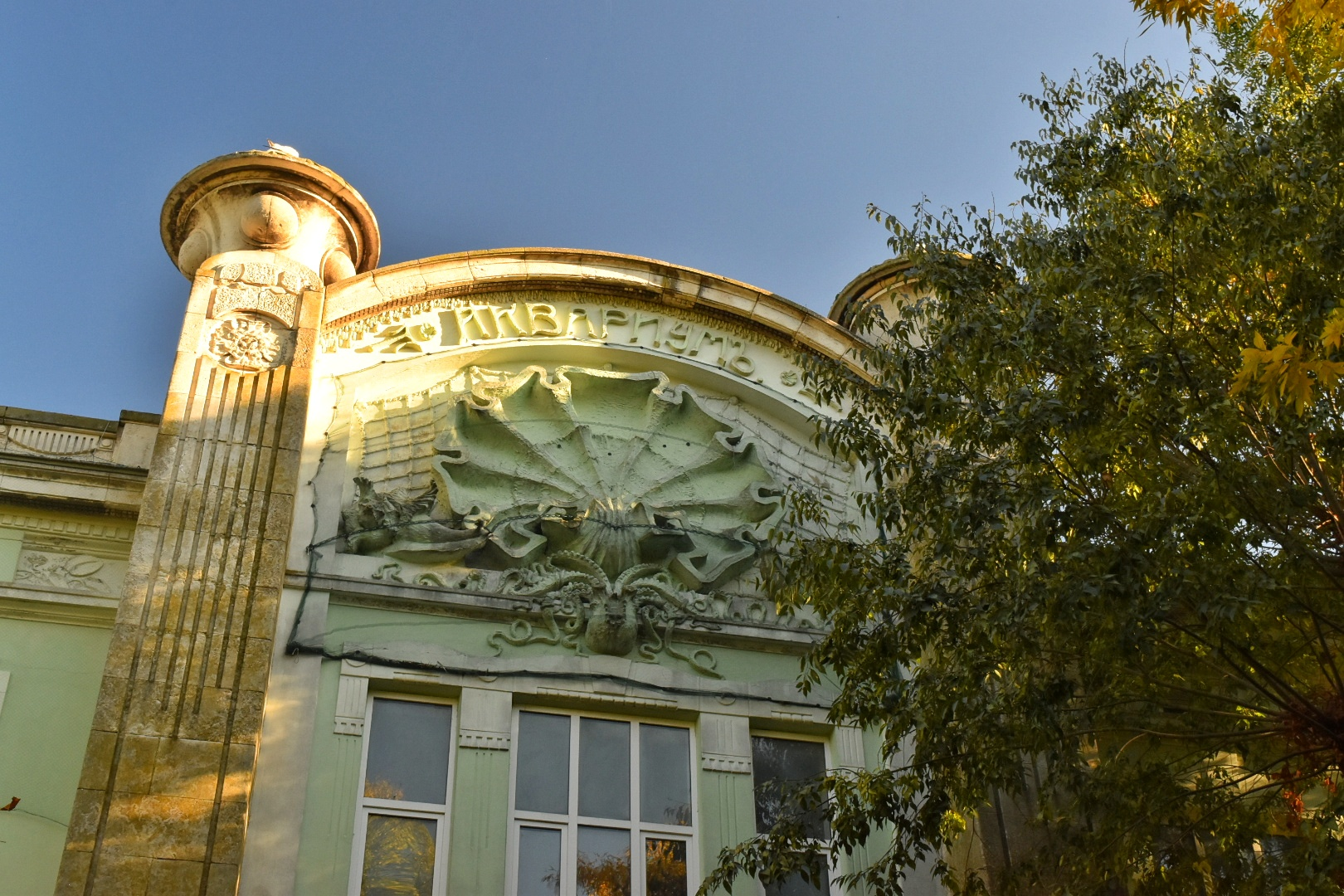
Varna Aquarium

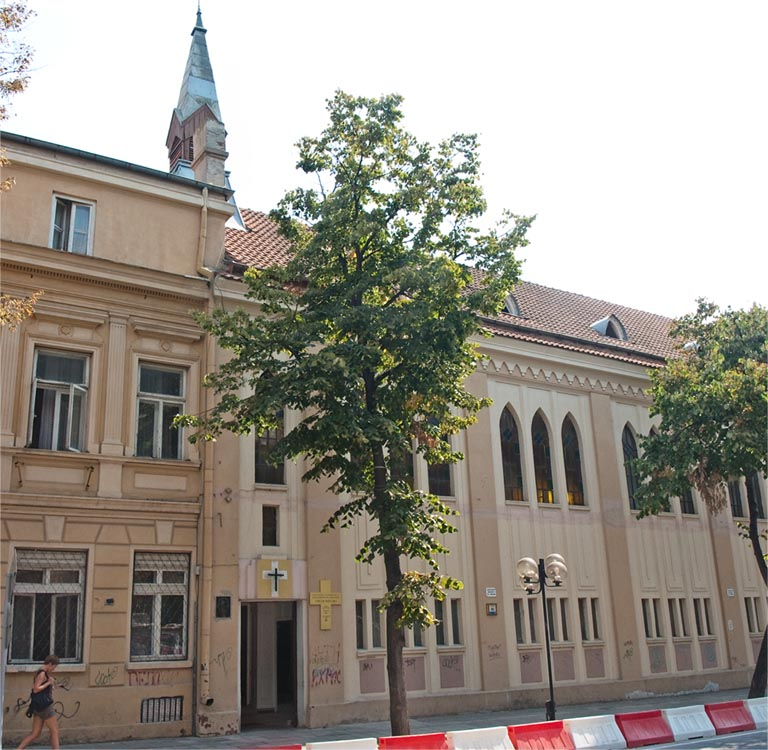
Church of Saint Archangel Michael

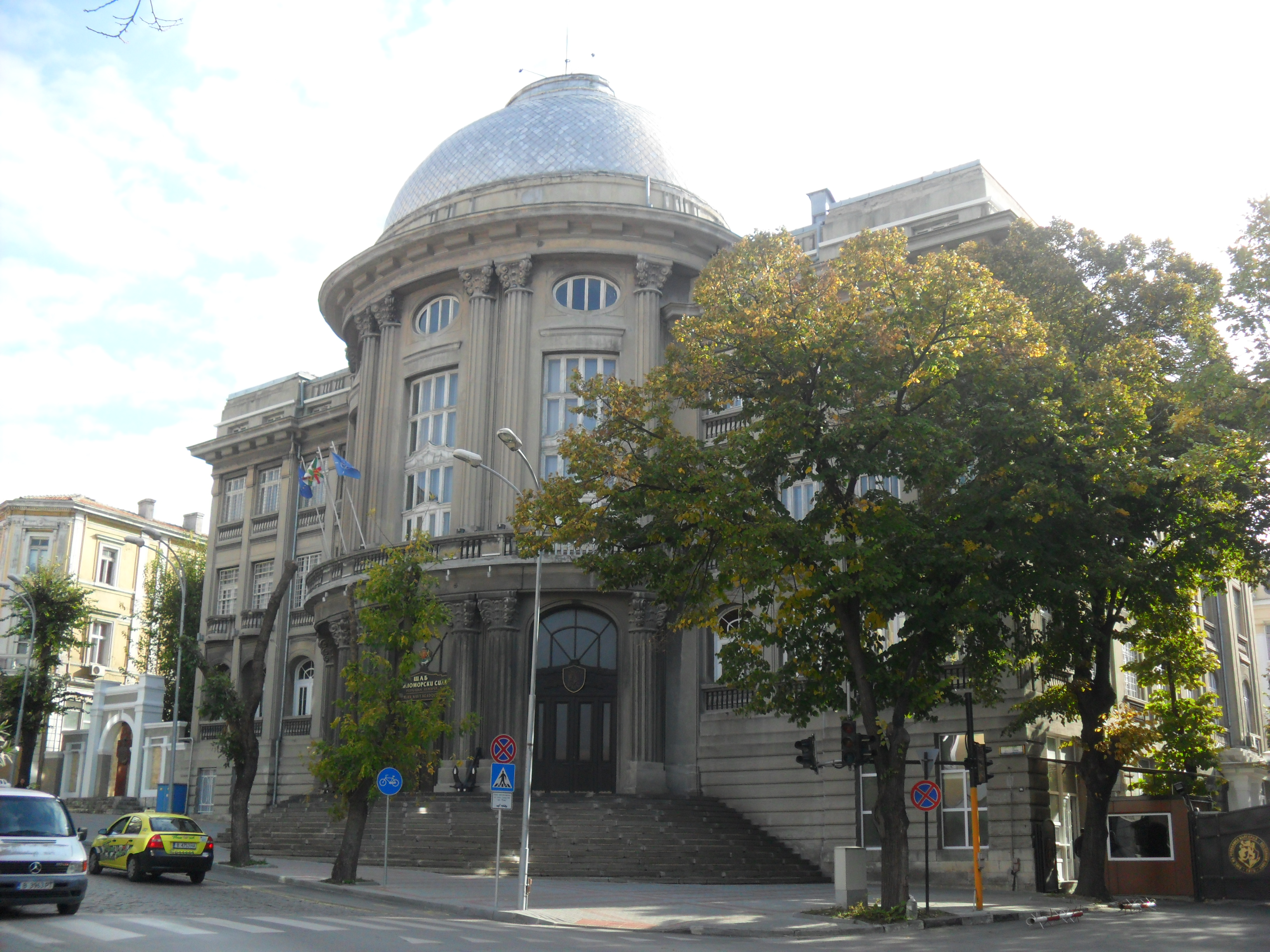
Bulgarian Navy Headquarters
