= Kanli Kula =

Fortress in Herceg Novi, Montenegro, used as an open-air theatre

Coordinates: 42.4524°N 18.5381°E

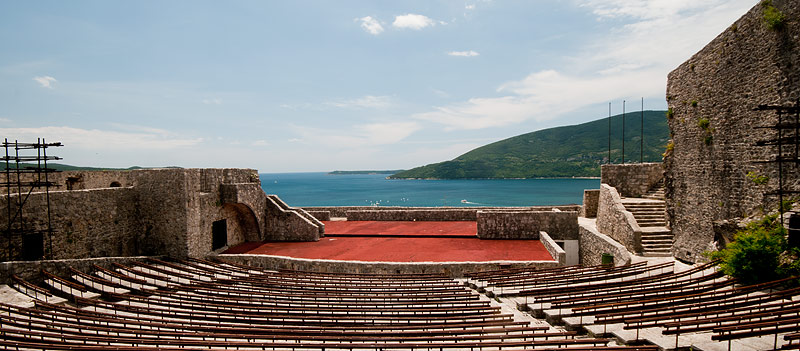

Kanli Kula is a fortress with an open-air amphitheater in Herceg Novi, Montenegro. The name is of Turkish origin, and means "bloody tower".

== History ==
Kanli Kula was built by the Turks in 1539. The Venetians made various repairs and additions in 1687, soon after conquering Herceg Novi.

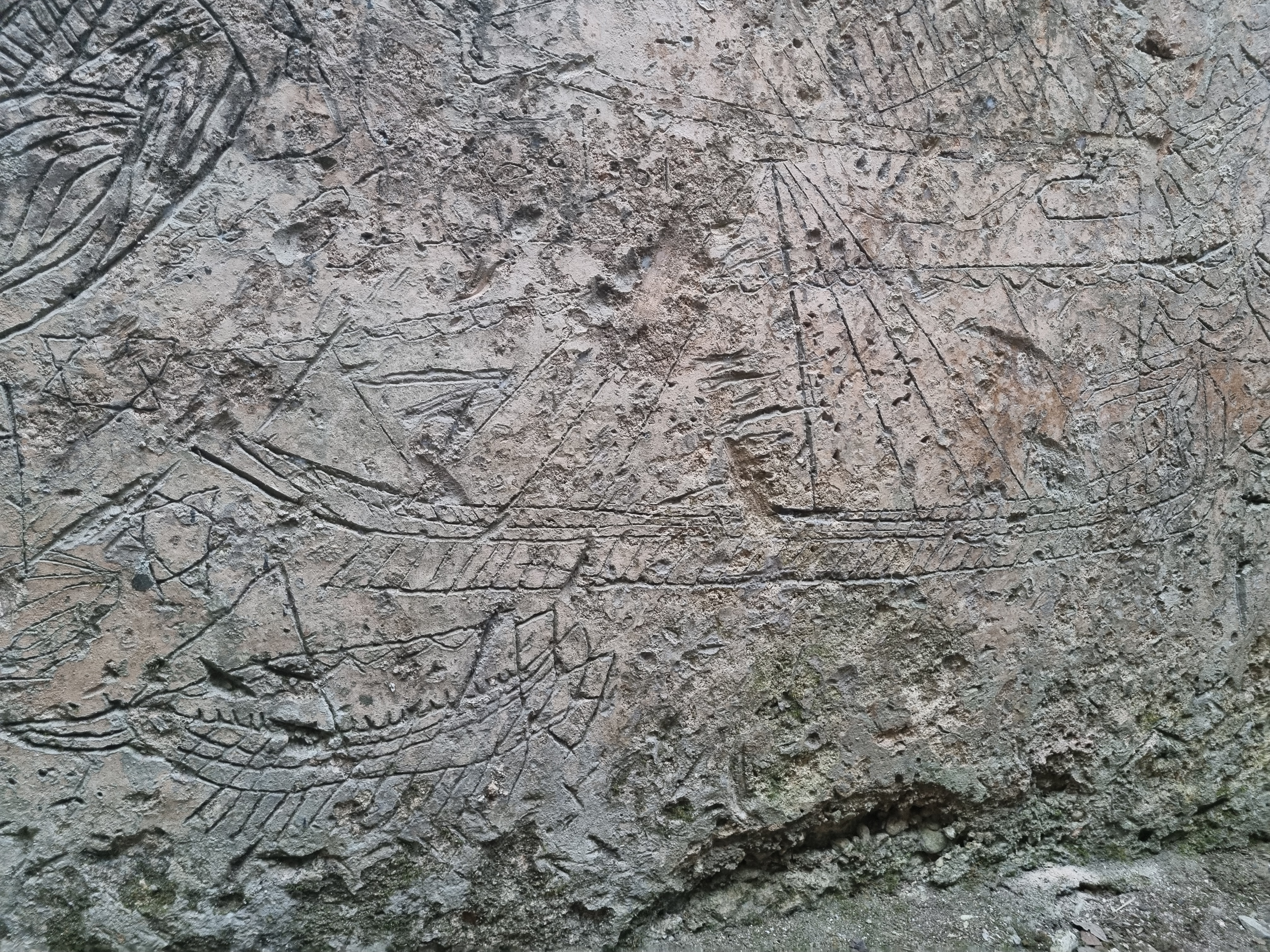
Drawings of ships on the walls of the prison in Kanli Kula

Inside the castle there was a well preserved water cistern. At some stage it lost its original purpose and became a prison, and was thereafter called “Bloody Tower“. The inmates left multiple drawings on the walls of the prison. The depicted ships were in service in 16th and 17th centuries, which allowed historians to date the founding of the prison.

== Cultural events ==
The inside of the Kanli Tower was restored into an open-air amphitheater in 1966. It seats over 1000 spectators, and has hosted many cultural events and festivals. Events that are organised in Kanli Kula have included the Herceg Novi Film Festival, Guitar Art Summer Fest and the Operosa Montenegro Opera Festival.
