= Sirak =

Sirak may refer to:

== People ==
=== Given name ===
- Sirak Beyene (born 1996), Eritrean-English footballer
- Sirak Melkonian (1930–2024), Iranian-Armenian modernist painter
- Sirak M. Sabahat (born 1981), Israeli actor
- Sirak Skitnik (died 1943), Bulgarian painter
- Sirak Tesfom (born 1994), Eritrean road racing cyclist

=== Surname ===
- Fantaye Sirak (born 1963), Ethiopian middle-distance runner

== Places ==
- Sirak, Chaharmahal and Bakhtiari, a village in Iran
- Sirak, East Azerbaijan, a village in Iran
- Sirak, Lorestan, a village in Iran

== Other uses ==
- Sirak language, a language also known as Nafi

== See also ==
- Širak (disambiguation)
