= Svetlin Rusev Donative Exhibition =

Permanent art exhibition in Pleven, Bulgaria

Coordinates: 43°24′30″N 24°37′3″E

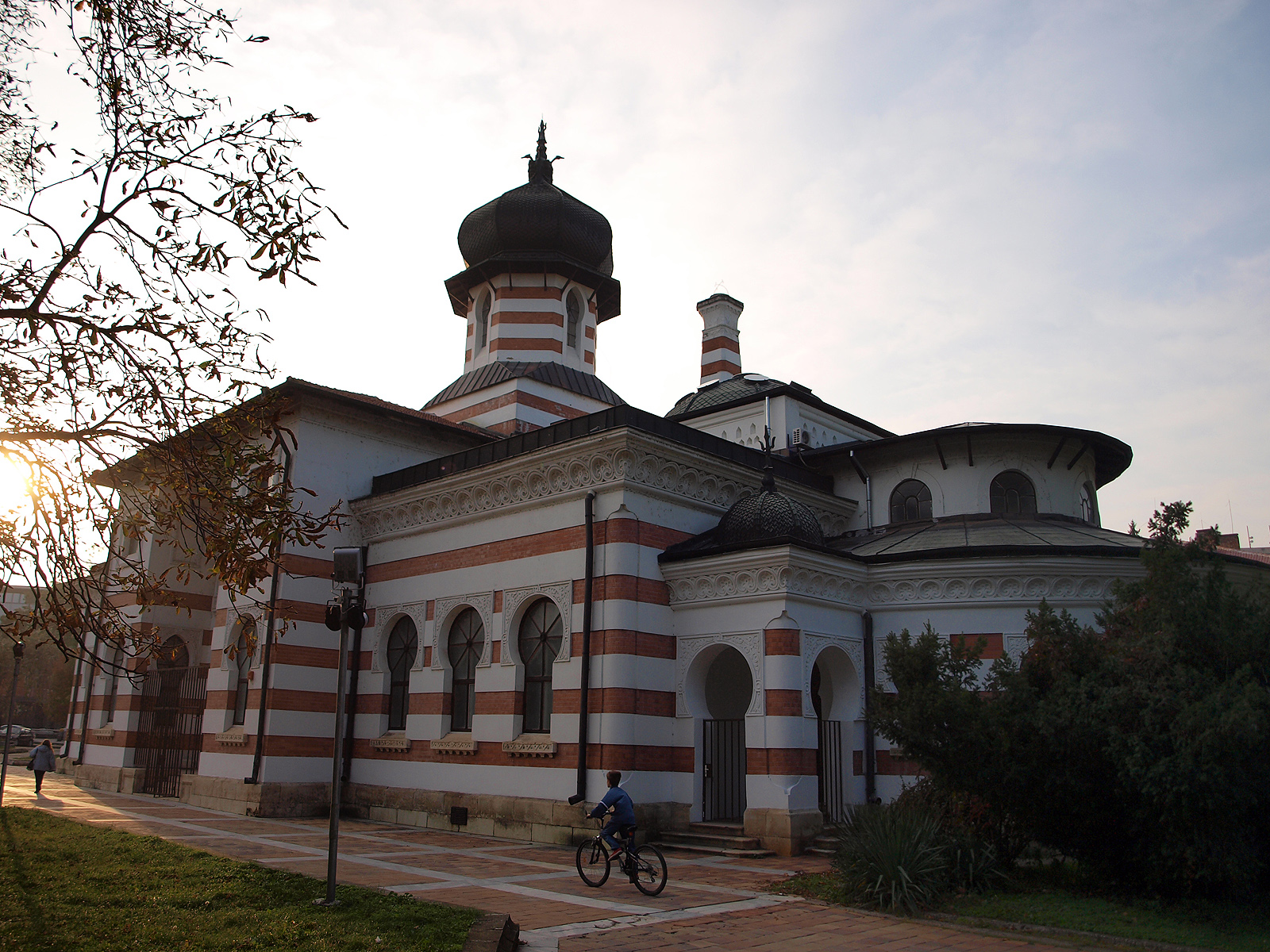
Svetlin Rusev Donative Exhibition

The Svetlin Rusev Donative Exhibition (Bulgarian: Изложба-дарение „Светлин Русев“, Izlozhba-darenie „Svetlin Rusev“) is a permanent art exhibition in Pleven, Bulgaria, including over 400 works of Bulgarian and foreign art donated by the noted Bulgarian artist and collector Svetlin Rusev.

The exhibition occupies the three-storey historic building of the former public baths built in the 1900s and commissioned to Nikola Lazarov, who combined Neo-Byzantine, Neo-Moorish and Ottoman elements in its design. It served as the city's public baths until 1970, and has been home to the exhibition since 1984, when Rusev donated 322 works of his collection of paintings and sculptures, in 1999 adding 82 more.

Works of the best-known Bulgarian artists from the early 20th century are exhibited on the first storey. These include Zlatyu Boyadzhiev, Tsanko Lavrenov, Sirak Skitnik, Kiril Petrov, Bencho Obreshkov, Dechko Uzunov, Vladimir Dimitrov, etc.

The second storey mainly features contemporary Bulgarian painters, such as Nikola Manev, Vesa Vasileva, Encho Pironkov, Georgi Bozhilov, but also the oldest painting in the gallery, a 17th-century work by an unknown French author, as well as a painting by Vienna Secession artist Josef Bauer.

On the third storey, occupying the building's towers, one can see not only a collection of works of leading Bulgarian engravers such as Ilia Beshkov, Vladimir Dimitrov and Sidoniya Atanasova, but also famous Western European artists like Pablo Picasso, Francisco Goya, Honoré Daumier, Marc Chagall, Maurice Denis, Pierre-Auguste Renoir, Salvador Dalí, Renato Guttuso and Eugène Delacroix, as well as small sculptures of Auguste Rodin and Edgar Degas.
