= Shirak =

Shirak or Širak may refer to:

== Places ==
- Shirak, a district of the ancient Armenian province of Ayrarat
- Shirak Province, an administrative division of Armenia
- Shirak, Armenia, a village in Shirak Province, Armenia
- Shanbarak, a village in Qazvin Province, Iran, formerly known as Shīrak
- Shirag, a village in South Khorasan Province, Iran, also called Shīrak
- Shirak Airport, an international airport in Gyumri, Armenia
- Shirak State University, a state university in Gyumri, Armenia
- Shirak Poghosyan (born 1969), Armenian long jumper
- Deh Shirak, a village in Iran
- Shirak Plain, a plain in the Armenian Plateau

== Other uses ==
- FC Shirak, football club from Gyumri, Armenia
- Shirak (periodical), Lebanese Armenian literary publication

== See also ==
- Sirak (disambiguation)
