= Beyene =

Beyene is an Ethiopian surname or, more precisely, patronymic. Notable people with the surname include:

- Bébéy Beyene (born 1992), Cameroonian footballer
- Beraki Beyene (born 1980), Eritrean long-distance runner
- Girma Bèyènè, Ethiopian musician
- Minyahil Teshome Beyene (born 1985), Ethiopian footballer
- Sirak Beyene (born 1996), Eritrean-English footballer
- Tamagn Beyene, Ethiopian human rights activist, actor and comedian
- Tirfi Tsegaye Beyene (born 1984), Ethiopian long-distance runner
- Tsega Gebre Beyene (born 1994), Ethiopian racing cyclist
- Yaqob Beyene (1936–2025), Ethiopian translator and academic
- Yidnekachew Beyene (born 1989), Ethiopian footballer
- Yonas Beyene, Ethiopian archeologist

Notable people with the given name include:

- Beyene Legesse (born 1934), Ethiopian short-distance runner and Olympian
- Beyene Merid (1897–1937), Ethiopian army commander
- Beyene Petros (1950–2024), Ethiopian politician and educator
