= Nikola Lazarov =

Bulgarian architect (1870–1942)

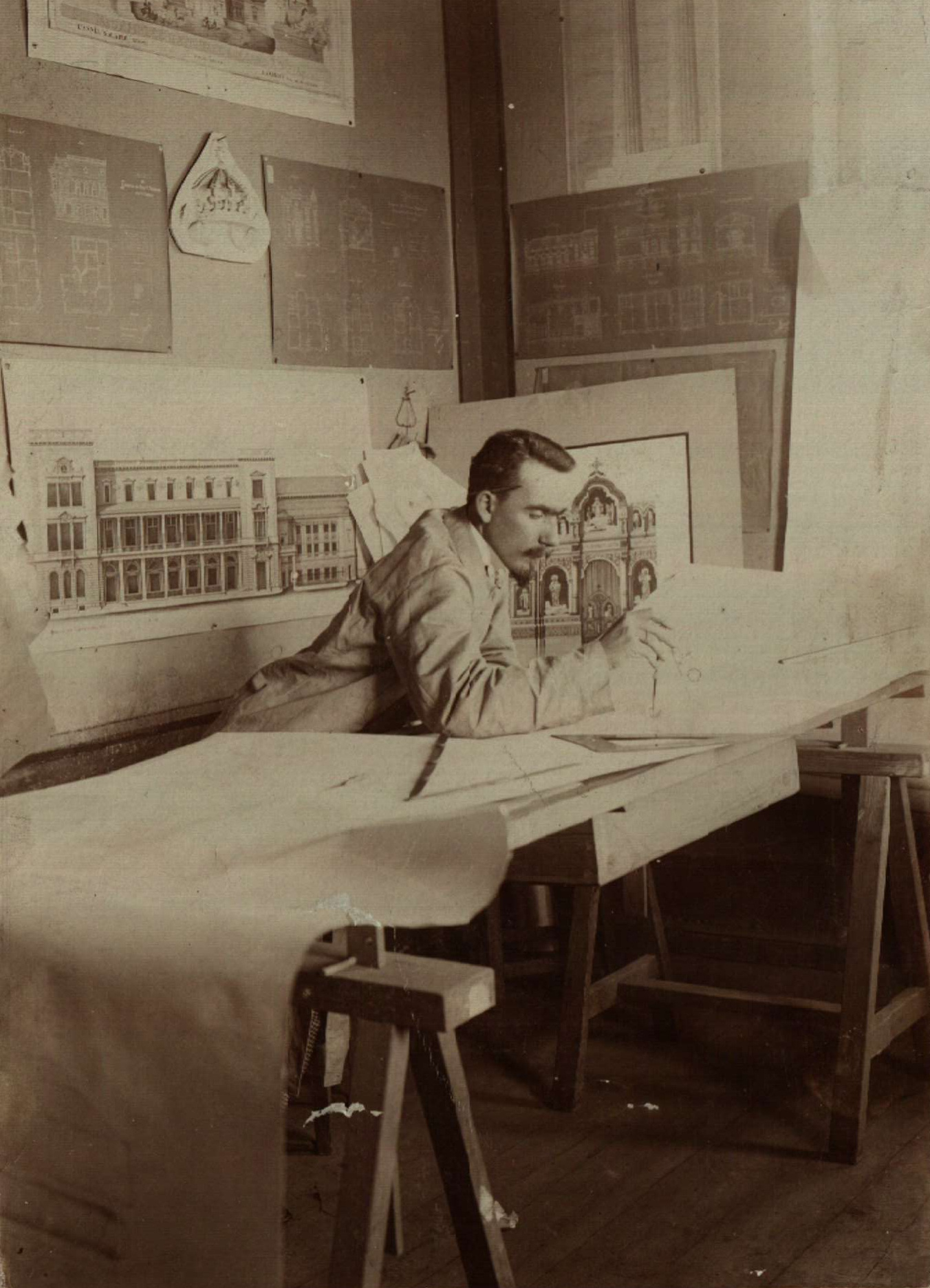
Nikola Lazarov, 1907. Source: Bulgarian Archives State Agency

Nikola Ivanov Lazarov (Bulgarian: Никола Иванов Лазаров; 1 April 1870 – 14 June 1942) was a Bulgarian architect.

Lazarov was born in the sub-Balkan town of Karlovo, then part of the Ottoman Empire (today in central Bulgaria). His father, a rose oil and woolen braid dealer and manufacturer, was killed by the Ottomans during the Russo-Turkish War of 1877–1878 which led to the Liberation of Bulgaria. Left an orphan, Lazarov moved to the capital Sofia, where he worked as a draftsman at the Capital Direction of Public Buildings under Friedrich Grünanger, Aleksi Nachev, Mihail Hashnov and Karl Heinrich. Lazarov received a Bulgarian state scholarship to study at the École Spéciale d'Architecture in Paris, France. He finished two years at the school only to return to Bulgaria due to a lack of funds. However, on the recommendation of several noted architects he was granted another scholarship, this time by the Prince of Bulgaria himself, and returned to Paris. He graduated from the École Spéciale d'Architecture in 1893 with a thesis on the main church of the Rila Monastery.

Upon his graduation Nikola Lazarov returned to Sofia. As a royal scholarship student, he was obliged to work for three years as a royal architect. During that period he participated in the construction of the northeast wing of the Sofia Royal Palace and the final interior works on the Euxinograd palace in Varna. He also finished the exterior and interior design of the Central Military Club in Sofia, which was only roughly constructed under Antonín Kolář.

In 1896, he established the first private architectural company (headquartered at Targovska Street), and in 1902 he became the first architect to be elected to the National Assembly of Bulgaria by joining the parliament as a deputy of his native Karlovo. Together with Yordan Milanov, he attended the 8th International Congress of Architects in Vienna in 1908. He worked actively as an architect until 1934. In 1937–1941, he was a leading member of the Capital Municipal Council and an advocate of Adolf Mussmann's 1938 city plan.

== Works ==
- Vrana Palace main building, Sofia; co-operation on the Sofia Royal Palace and Euxinograd palace
- Parushevi Brothers' twin houses at Oborishte Street, Sofia
- Baron Gendovich House, Sofia
- Ministry of Agriculture, Food and Forestry (Bulgaria)
- Central Military Club, Sofia (initial project by Antonín Kolář); military clubs in Shumen, Plovdiv and Varna
- Stoyan Bachvarov Dramatic Theatre, Varna
- Public Baths in Pleven
- Design for a new royal palace in Sofia

== Gallery ==
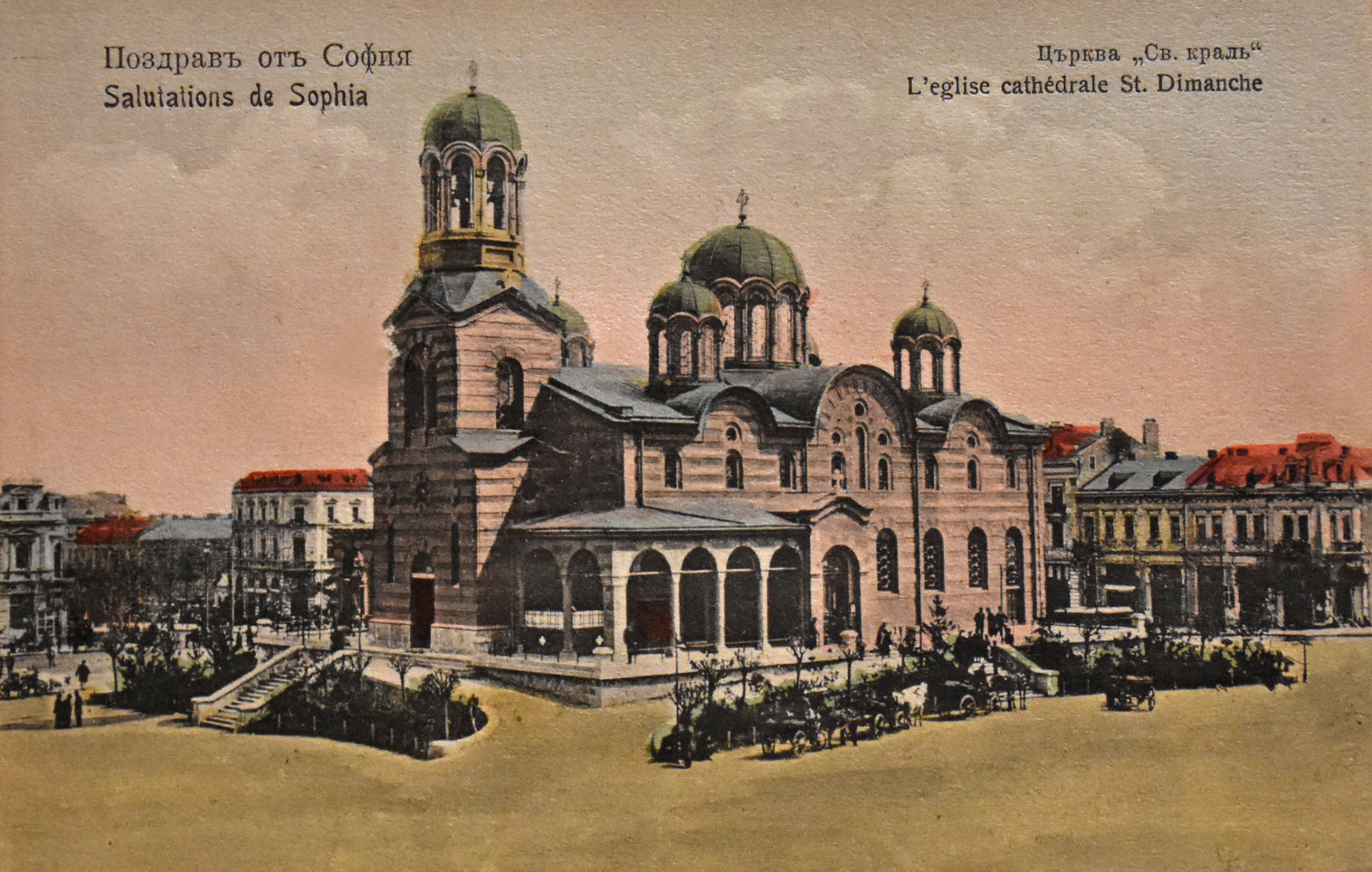
St Nedelya Church before its destruction by the attack in 1925.Arch. Nikola Lazarov

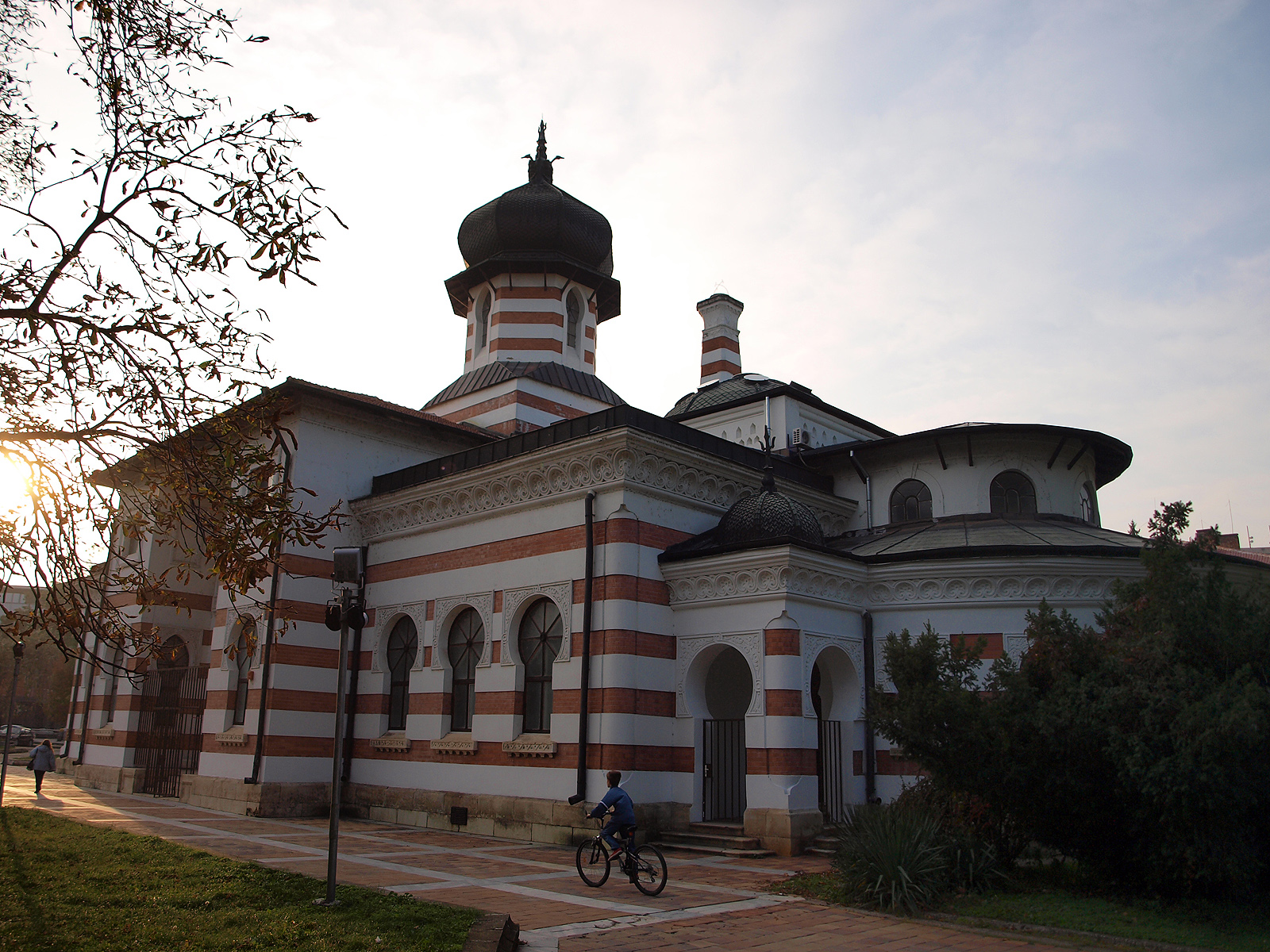
The bathhouse in Pleven, now an art gallery

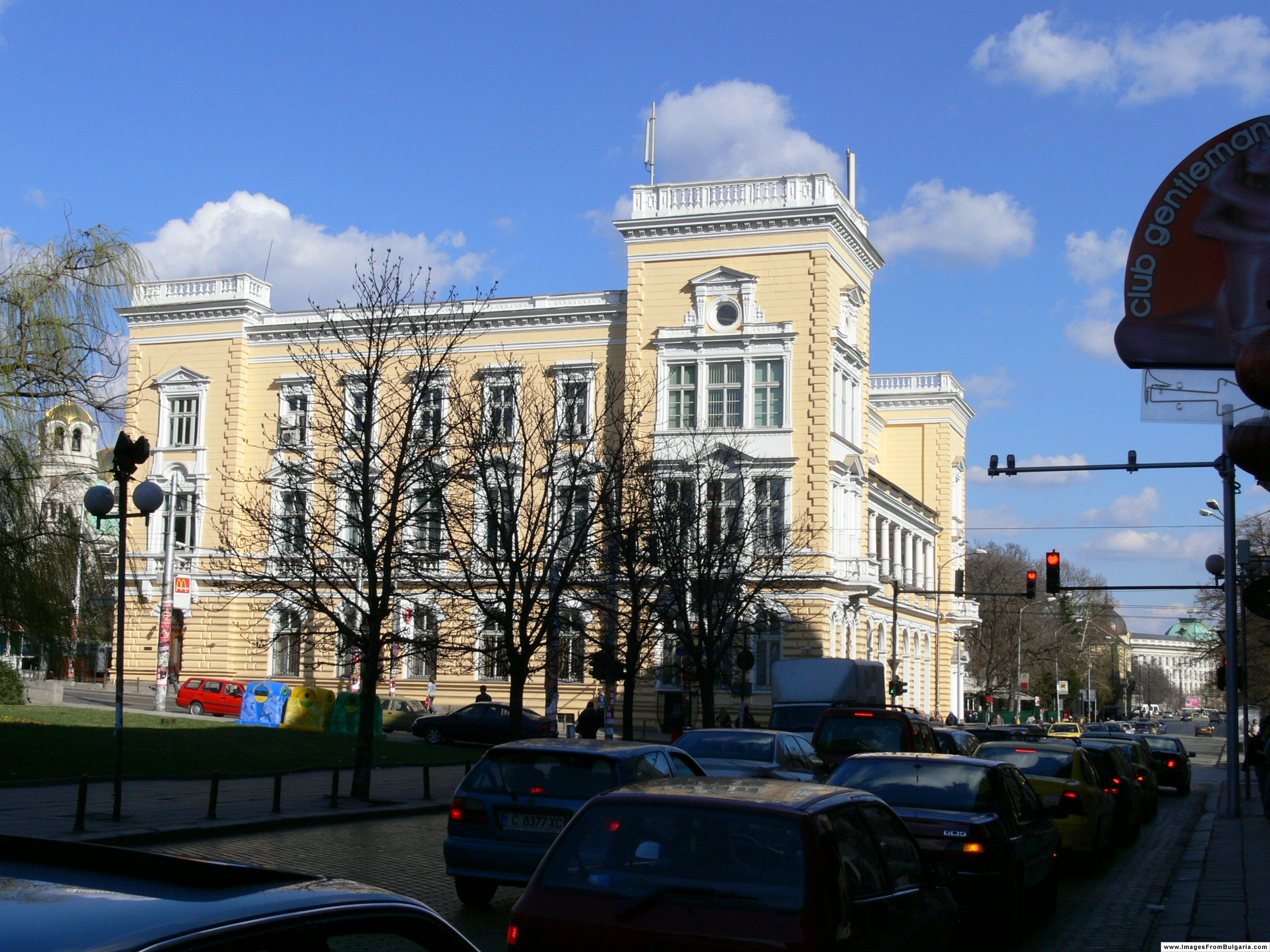
Central Military Club

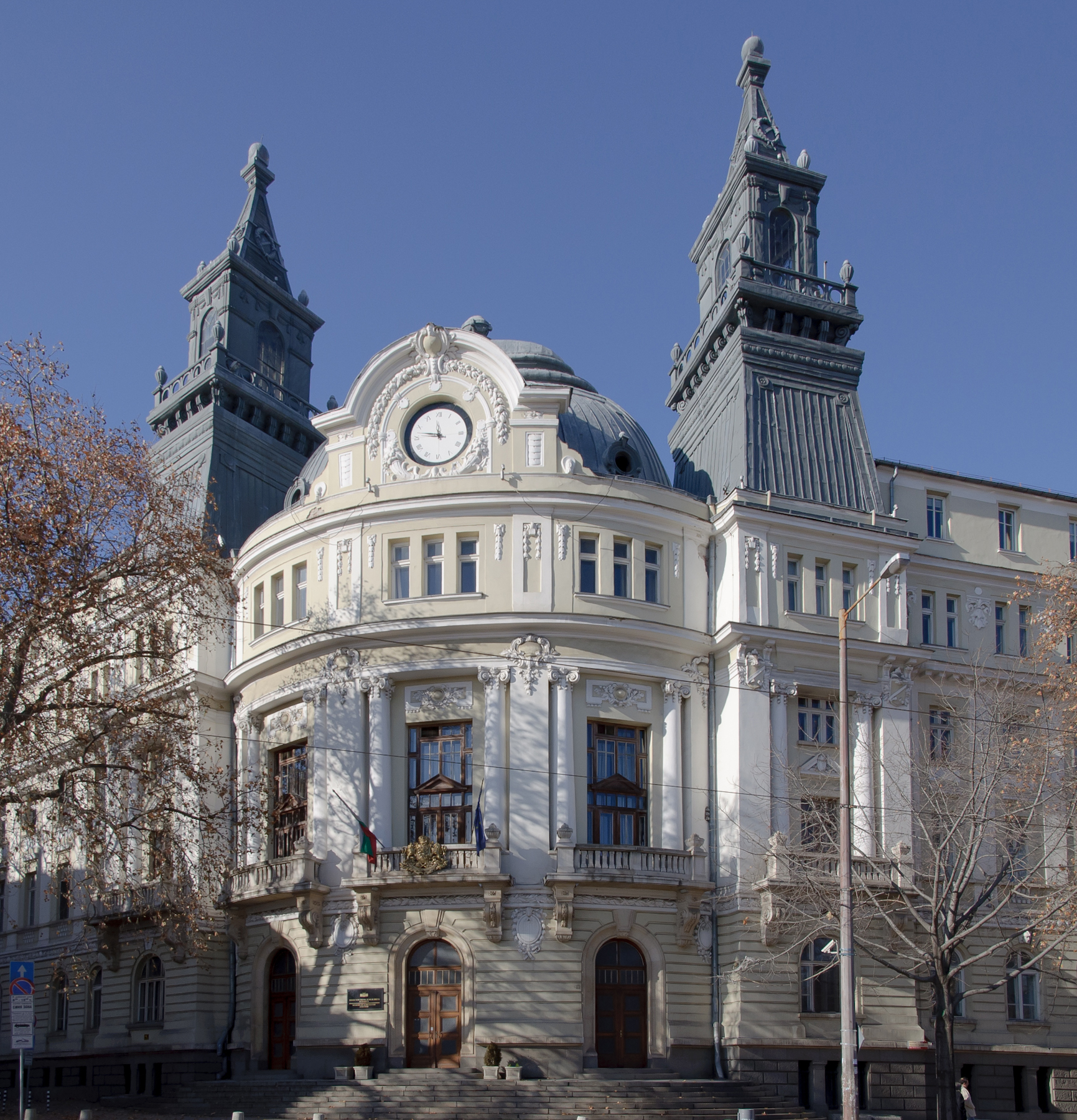
Ministry of Agriculture Food and Forestry

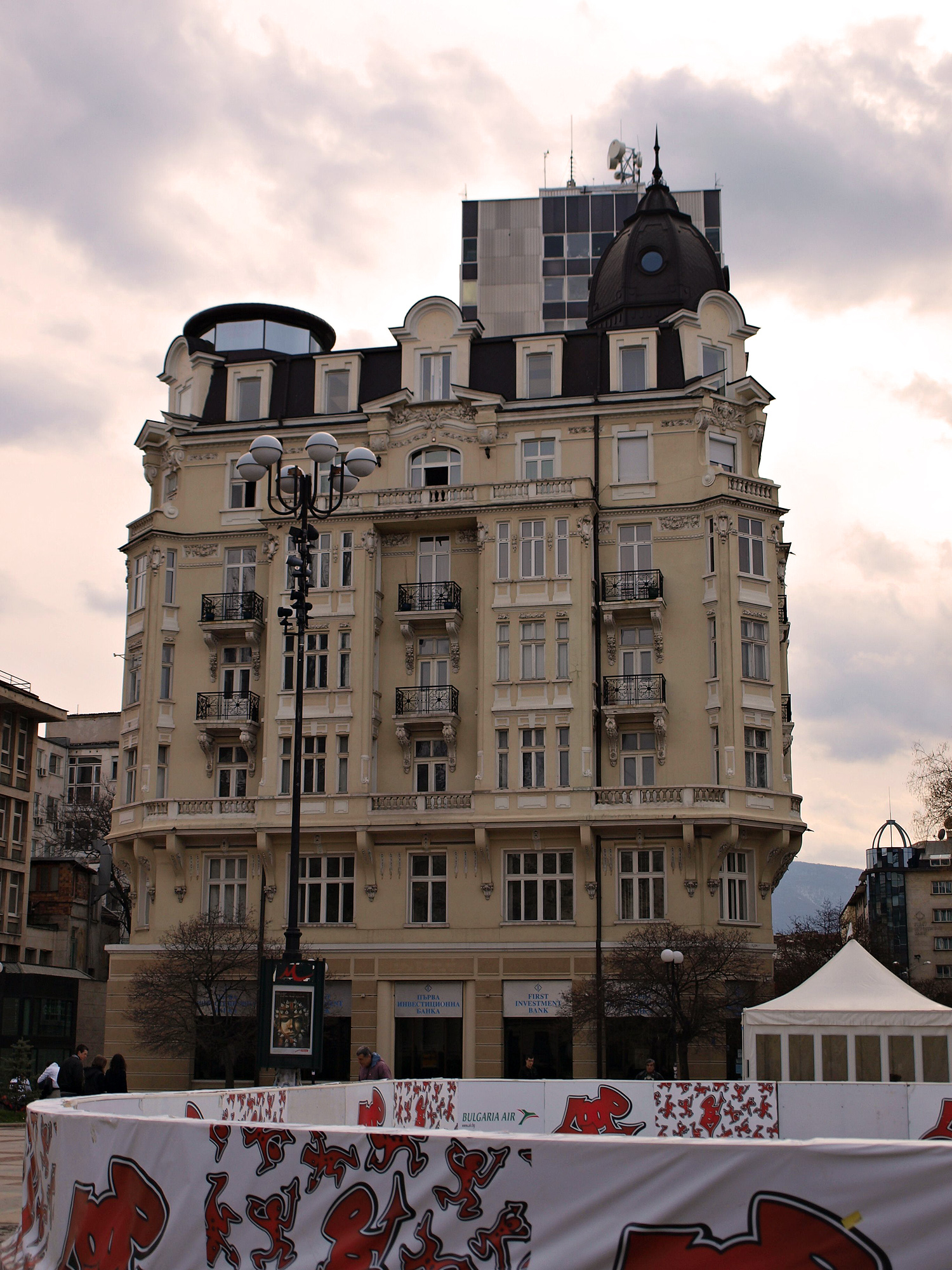
Baron Gendovich House

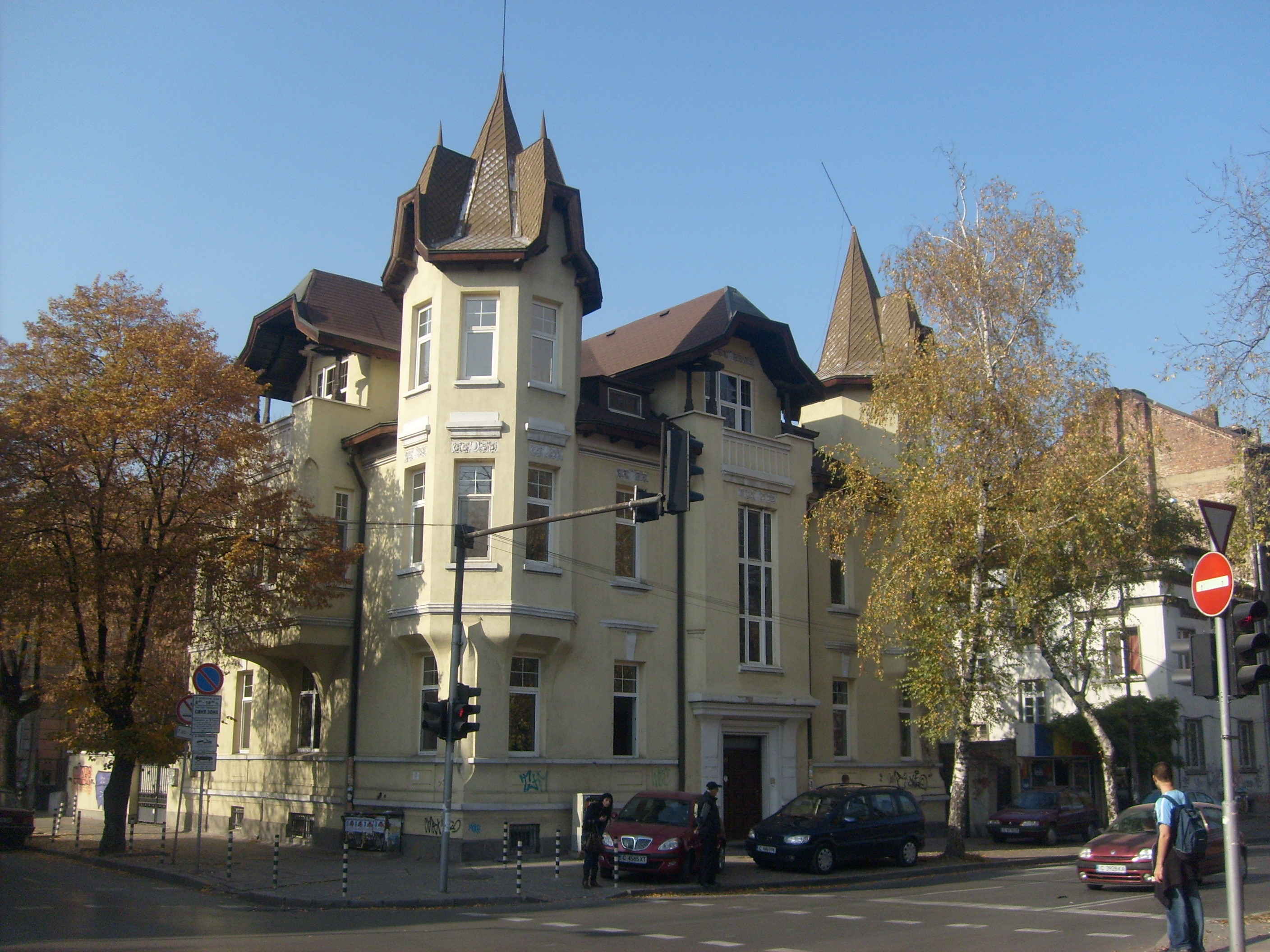
Parushevi brothers twin houses
