= Stoyan Bachvarov Dramatic Theatre =

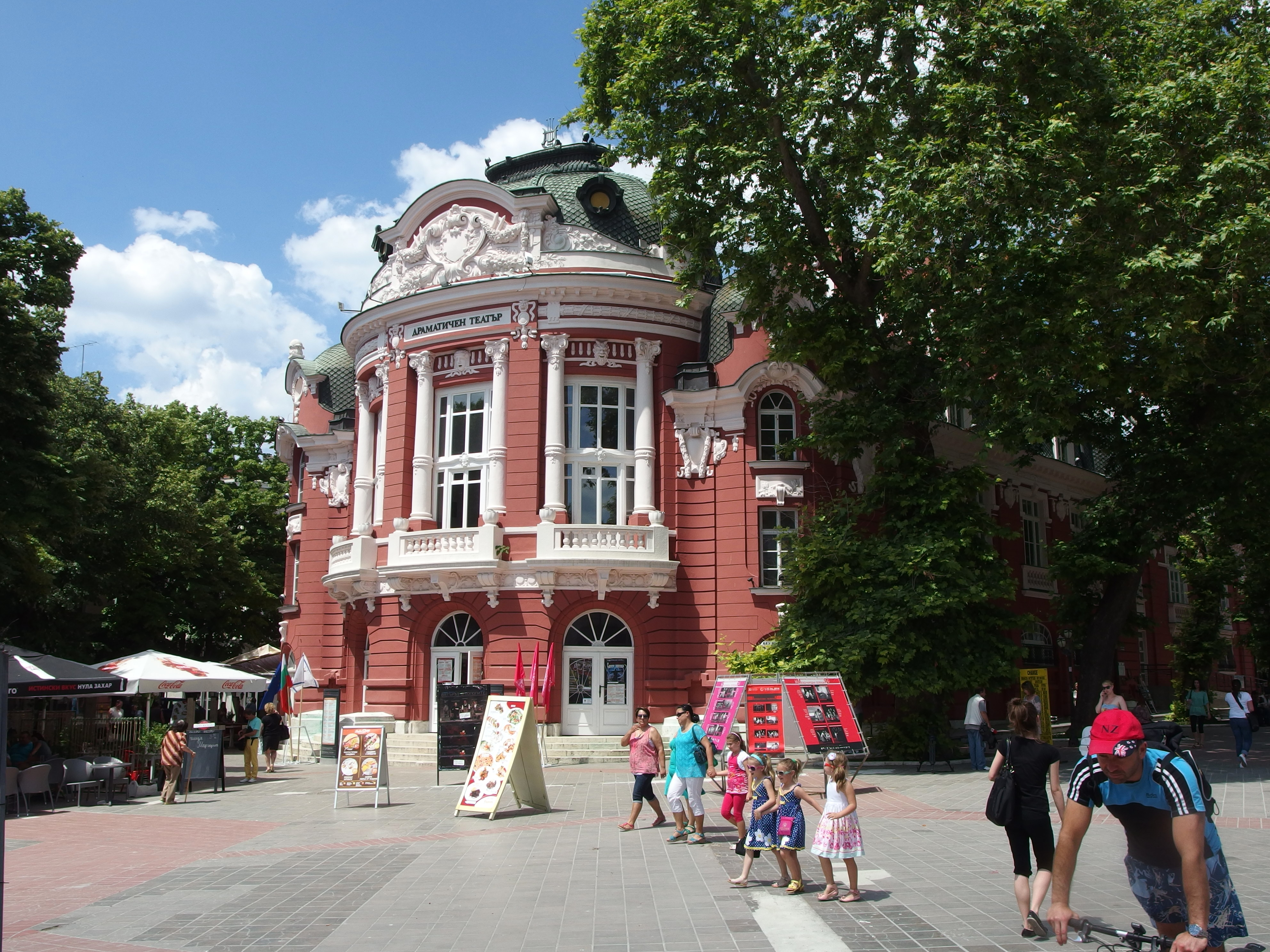

- Location within Bulgaria

General information
- Status: Completed
- Location: Varna, Bulgaria, Bulgaria
- Coordinates: 43°12′13″N 27°54′43″E

Design and construction
- Architect: Nikola Lazarov

The Stoyan Bachvarov Dramatic Theatre (Bulgarian: Драматичен театър ”Стоян Бъчваров”, Dramatichen teatar ”Stoyan Bachvarov”) is a theatre in Varna, Bulgaria, founded in 1921 as the Municipal Professional Theatre. It occupies a historic building in the centre of the city designed by Nikola Lazarov and built between 26 March 1912 and 5 June 1932. The building was finished by the architects Dabko Dabkov and Zhelyazko Bogdanov. It is named after the prominent theatre actor Stoyan Bachvarov.

The theatre has a main auditorium, a branch stage and a small auditorium.
