= Svetlin Rusev =

Bulgarian artist and art collector (1933–2018)

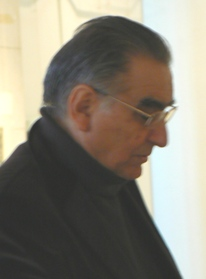
Svetlin Rusev

Svetlin Rusev (Bulgarian: Светлин Русев; 14 June 1933 – 26 May 2018) was a Bulgarian artist and a collector of art. He is known for the Svetlin Rusev Donative Exhibition, a permanent art exhibition in Pleven, including over 400 works of Bulgarian and foreign artist donated by him.
