= Royal Palace (Sofia) =

Former Royal Palace in Sofia, Bulgaria

Coordinates: 42.6963°N 23.3271°E

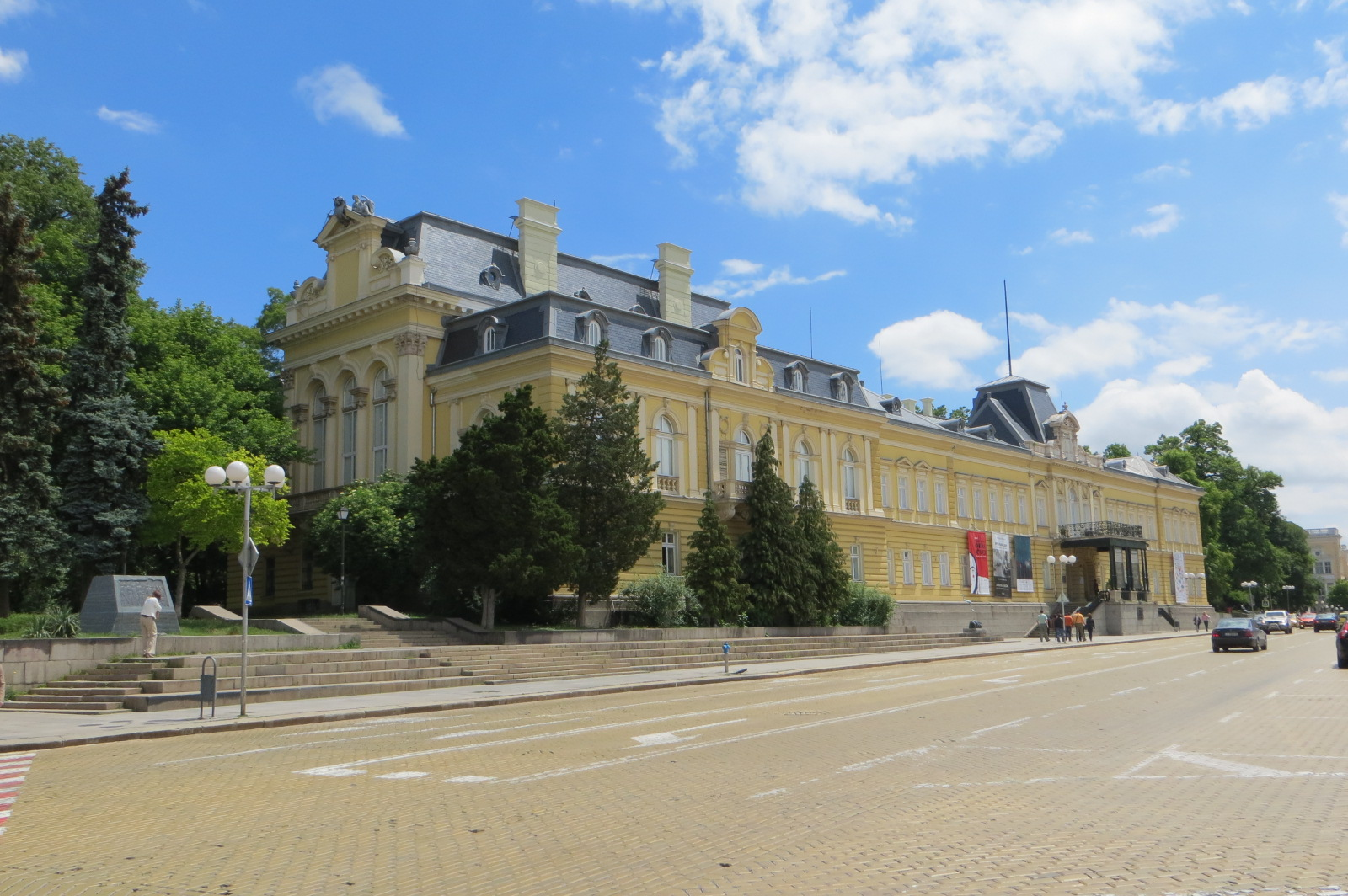
The Royal Palace of Sofia

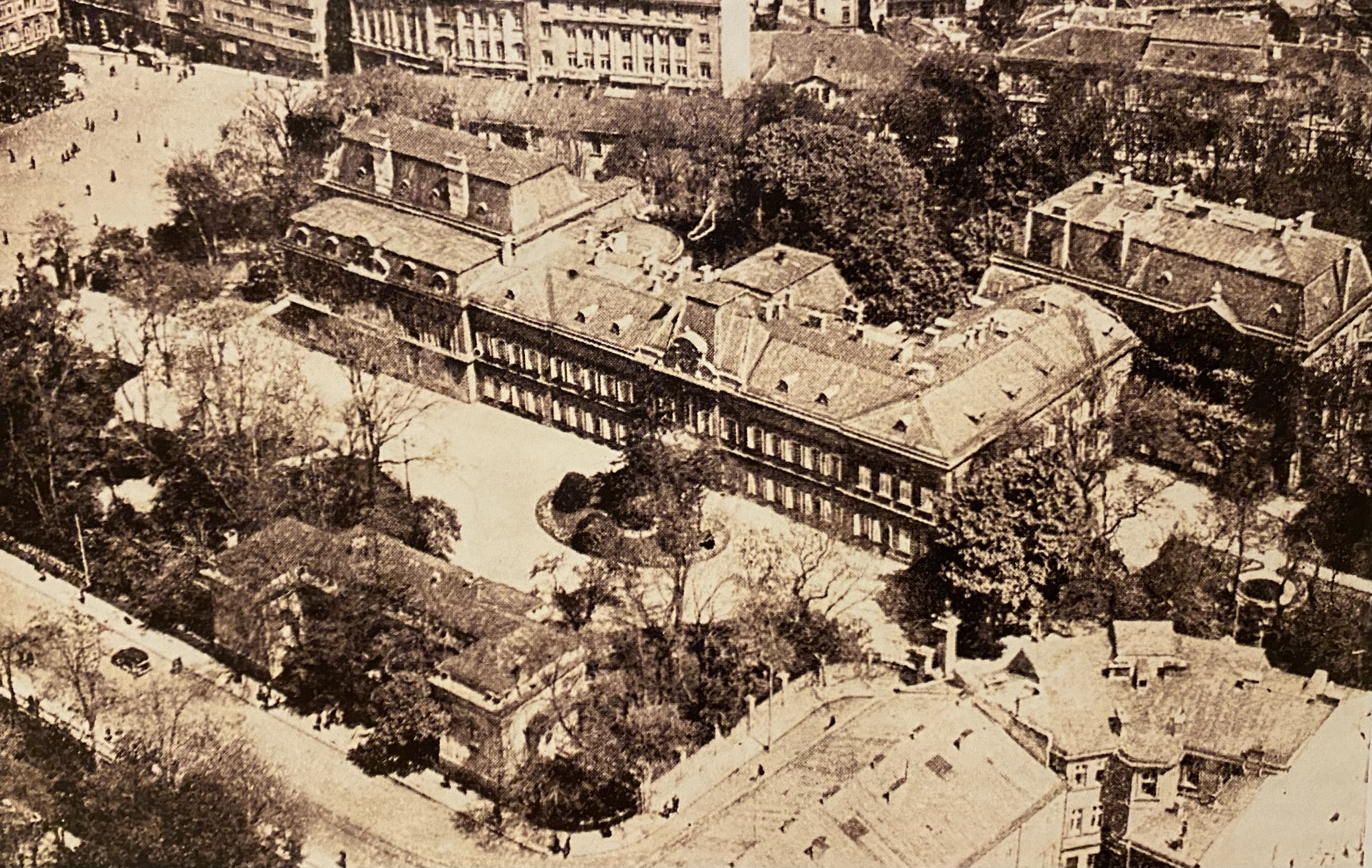
View from the air of the Royal Palace and its gardens in the 1920s. The division between the museums nowadays in the palace is from the central entrance: to the left is the National Gallery, to the right is the Ethnographic Museum.

The Royal Palace, in fact called Prince's Palace (Bulgarian: Княжески дворец – Knyazheski dvorets) and later Tsar's Palace (Bulgarian: Царски дворец – Tsarski dvorets), is an architectural landmark of national historical and cultural significance, fronting the north side of Battenberg Square, a long, green square in the heart of Sofia, the capital of Bulgaria.

Originally built after Bulgaria was made a semi-independent principality of the Ottoman Empire in 1878 to serve as the residence of the first Bulgarian knyaz, Alexander I Battenberg, the building now forms part of the National Gallery.

The palace has witnessed the country's transition from monarchy to a socialist people's republic and, ultimately, to today's republican democracy, with its inhabitants playing a pivotal role in Bulgaria's history. Erected in the late 19th century as the royal residence, the palace's architecture blends various styles, with prominent influences from Austrian Neo-Baroque and French Rococo. It was the government headquarters for seven years after the country became a republic. Since 1953 the palace serves as museum compound, housing:

- in the northwest wing – the main part of the National Art Gallery;
- in the southeast wing – the National Ethnographic Museum.

National Gallery (former National Art Gallery) and temporary exhibitions of Bulgarian and foreign art are on display in its halls.

== History ==
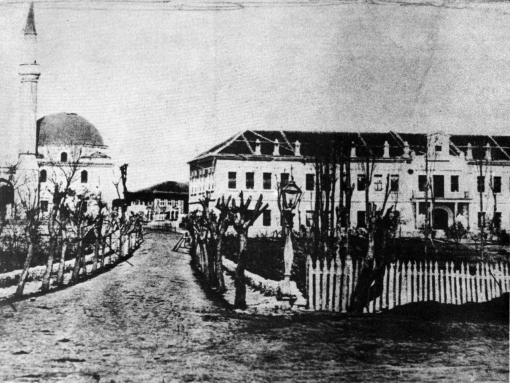
The old Konak, which was converted into the palace of prince Alexander, with the Chelebi Mosque to the left

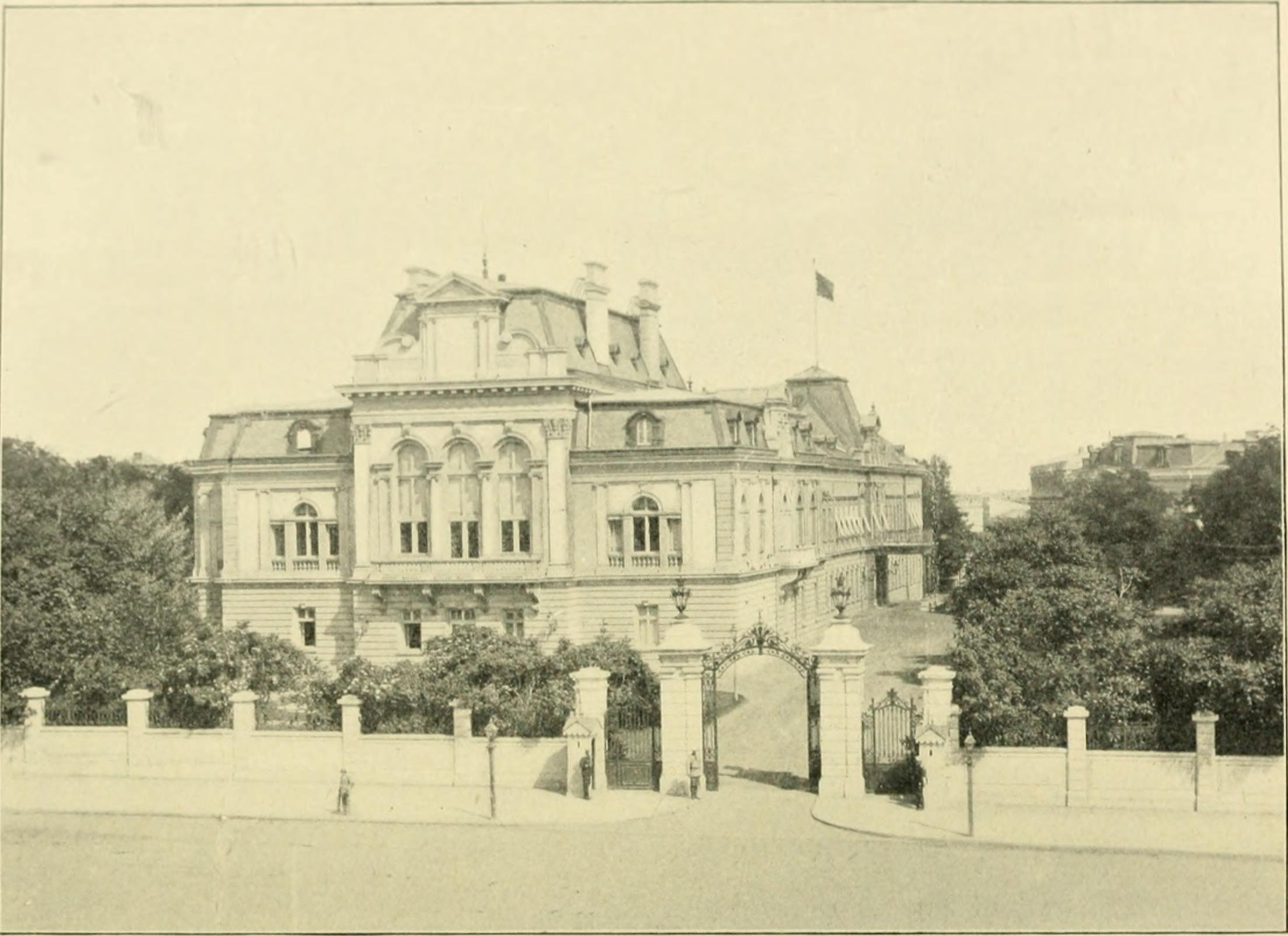
The extension designed by Viktor Rumplmayer

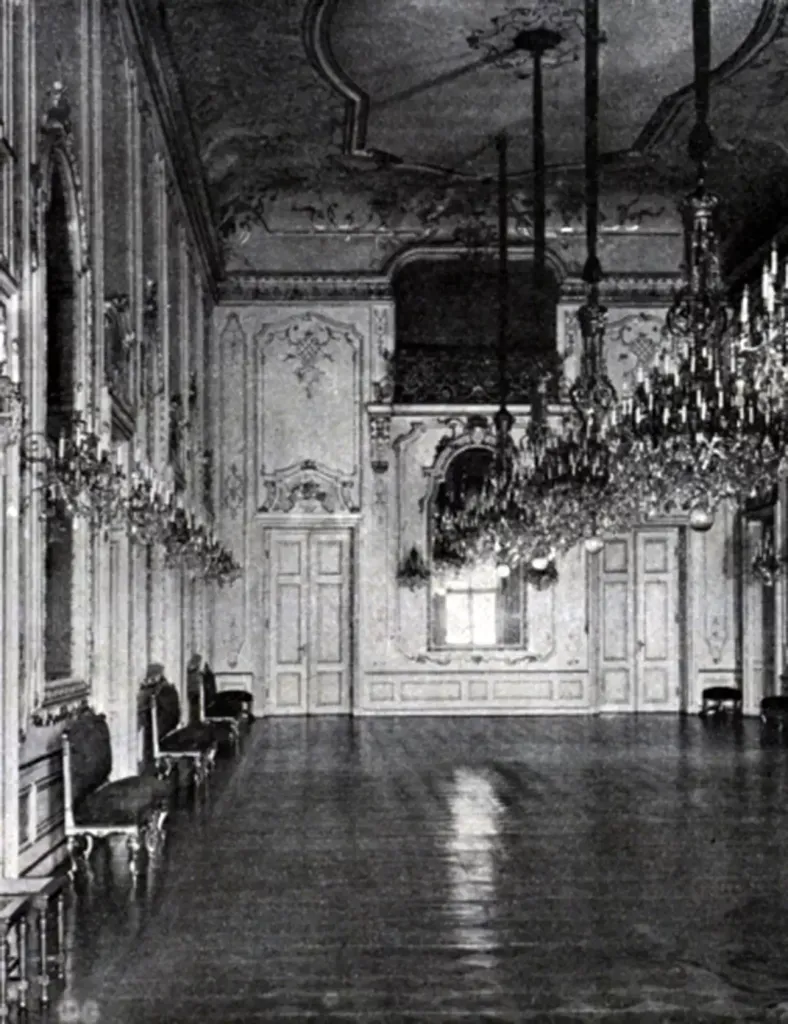
The Ball Room

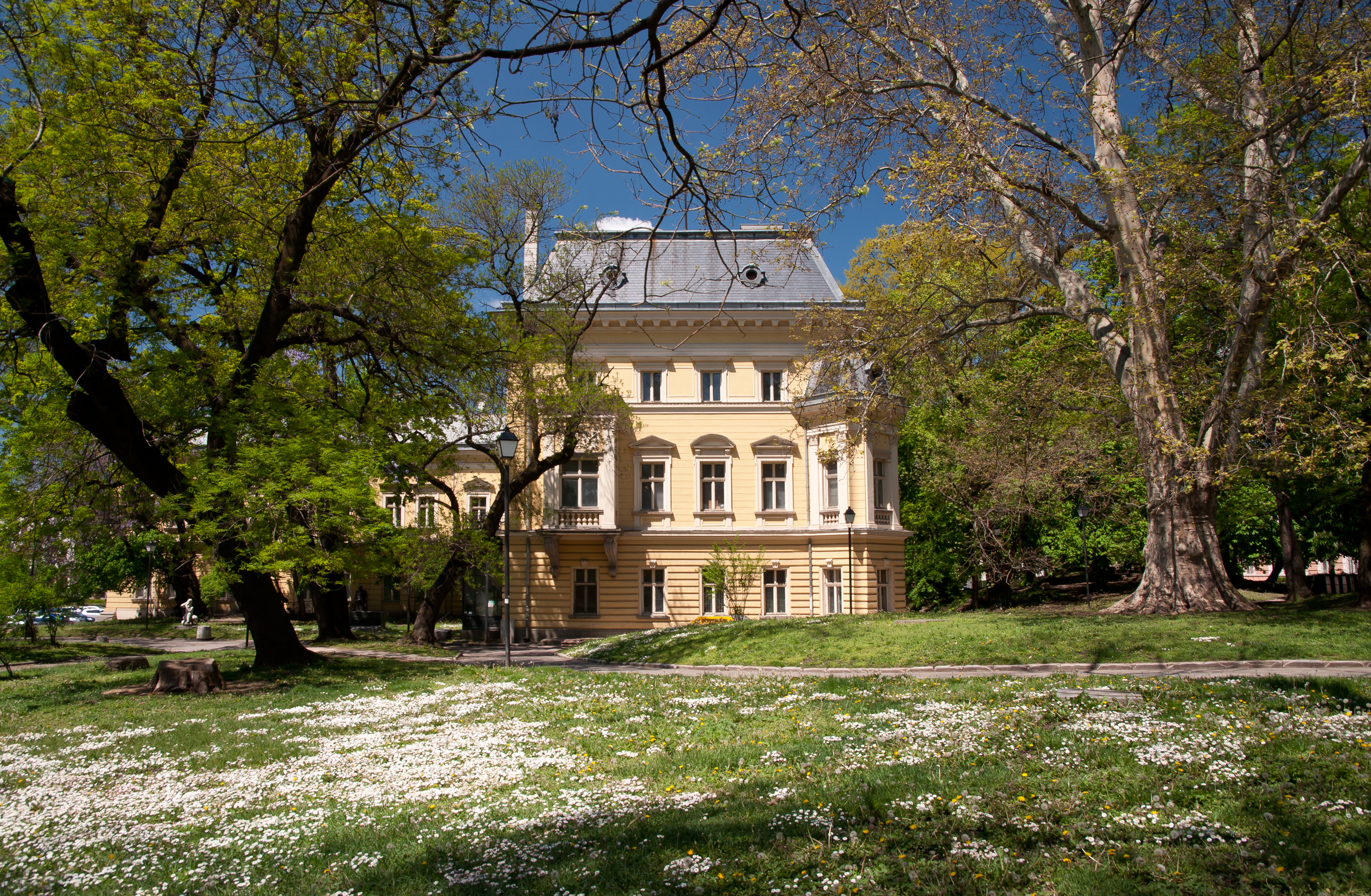
The north-eastern wing created by Friedrich Grünanger

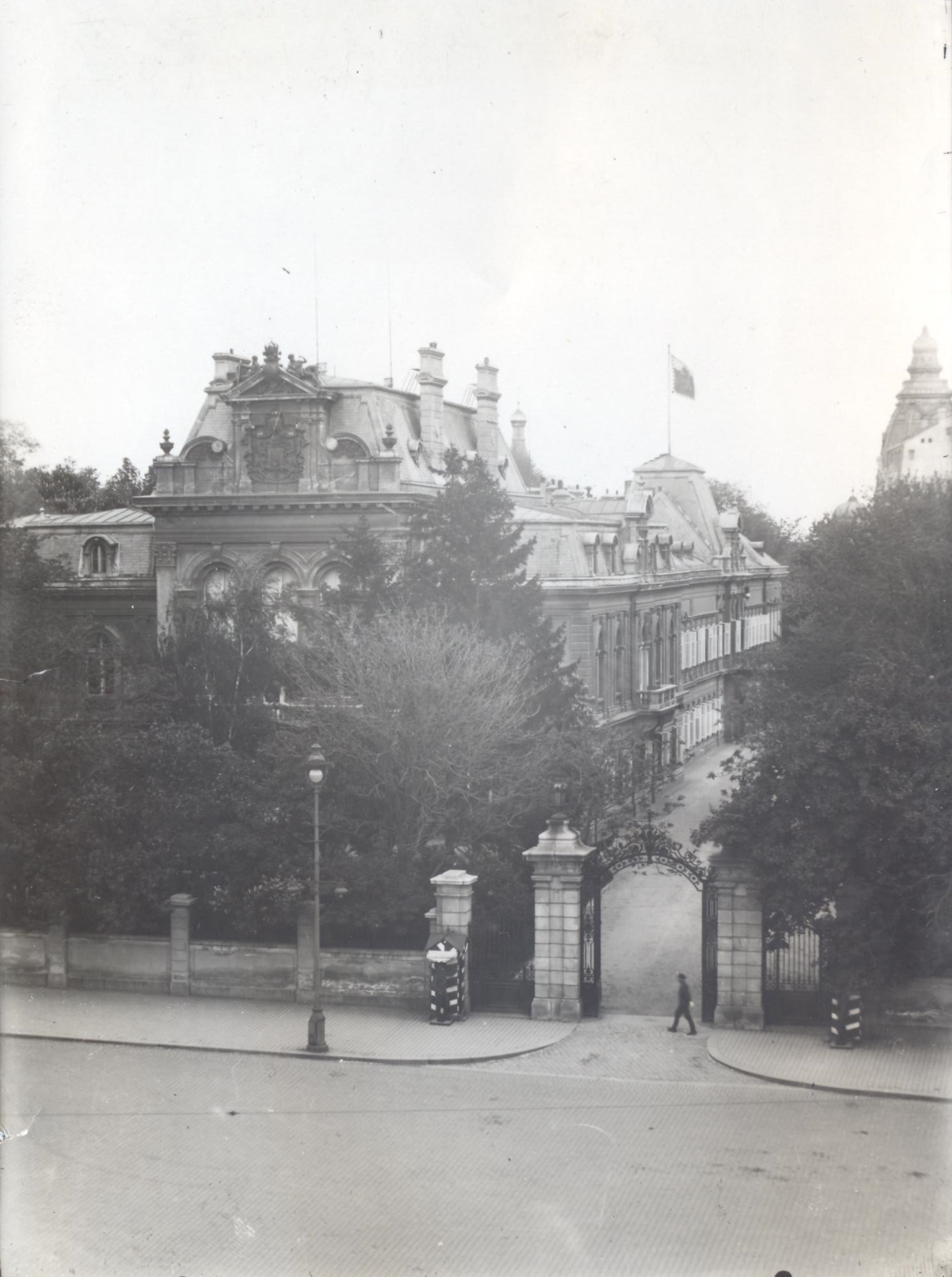
The palace with the garden in front

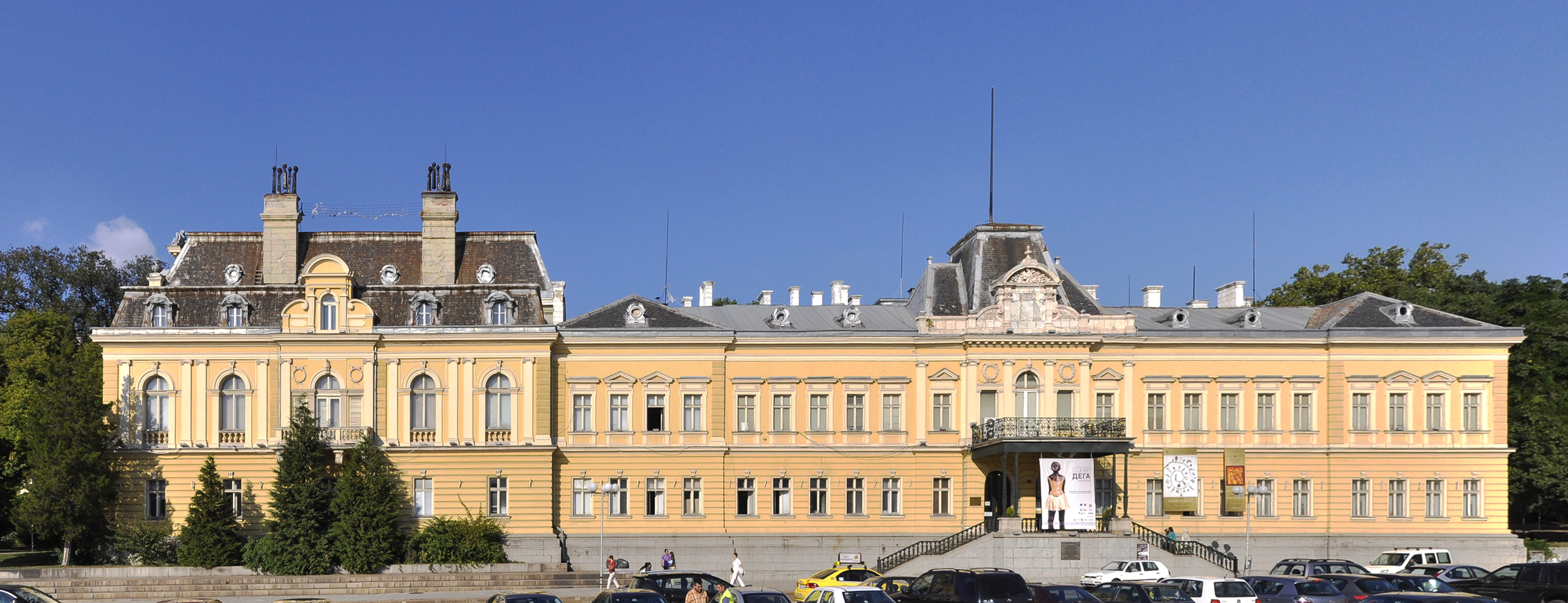
The palace garden has now been replaced by the Battenberg Square

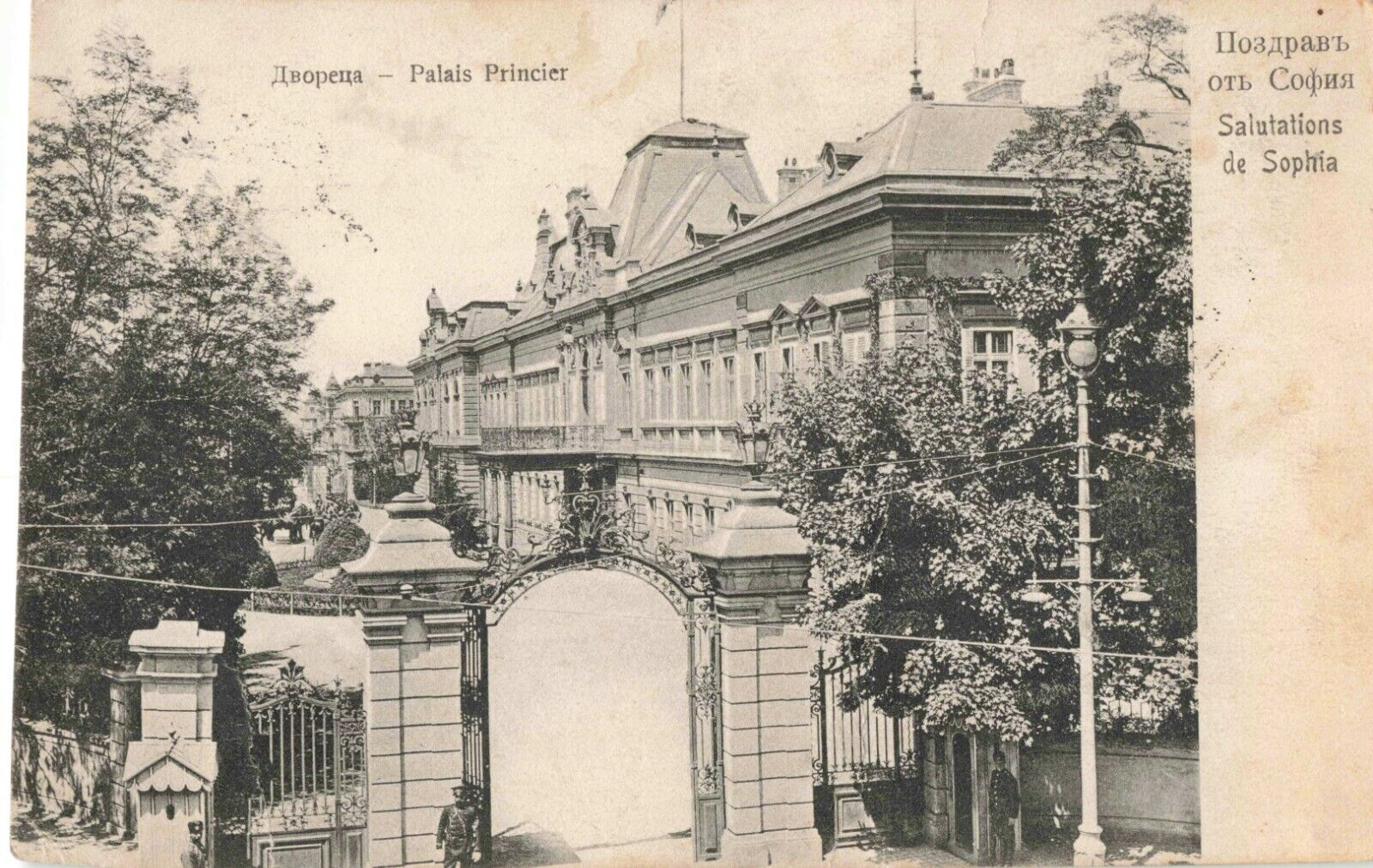
The entrance gate to the palace

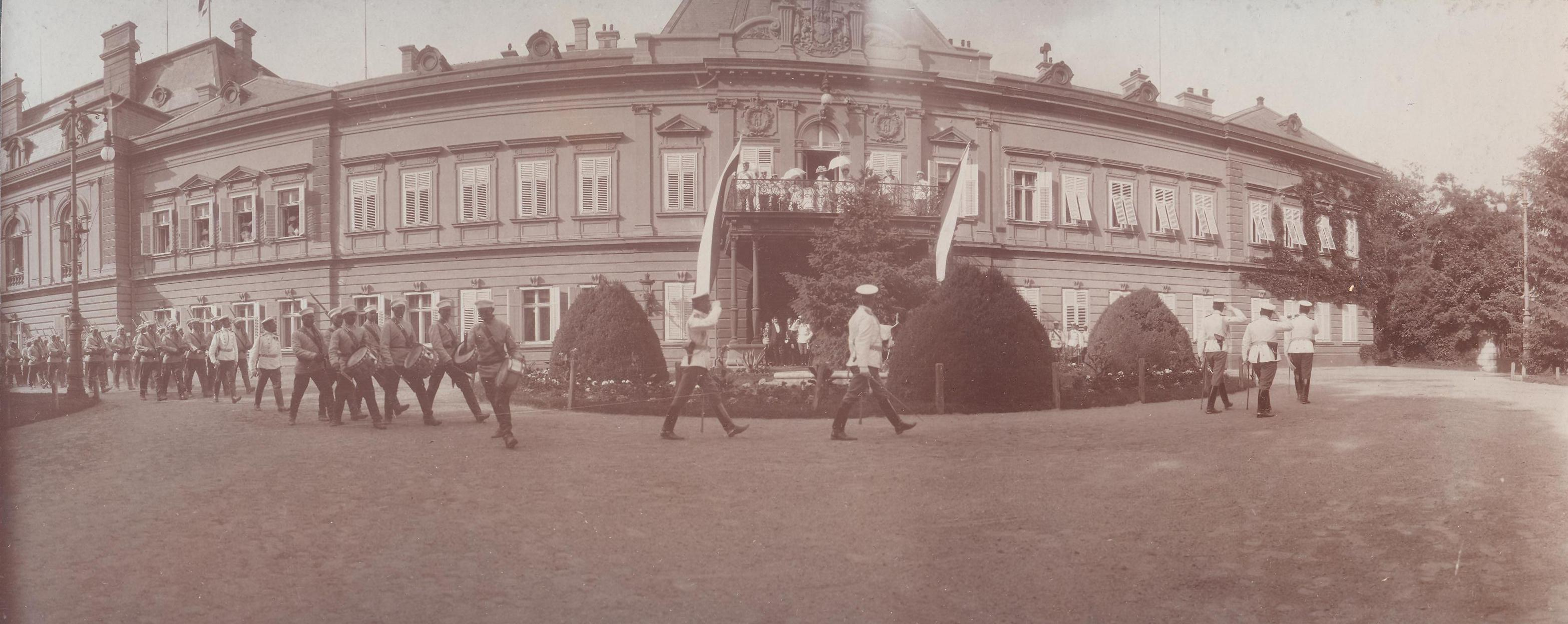
Military parade in front of the Royal Palace in 1923

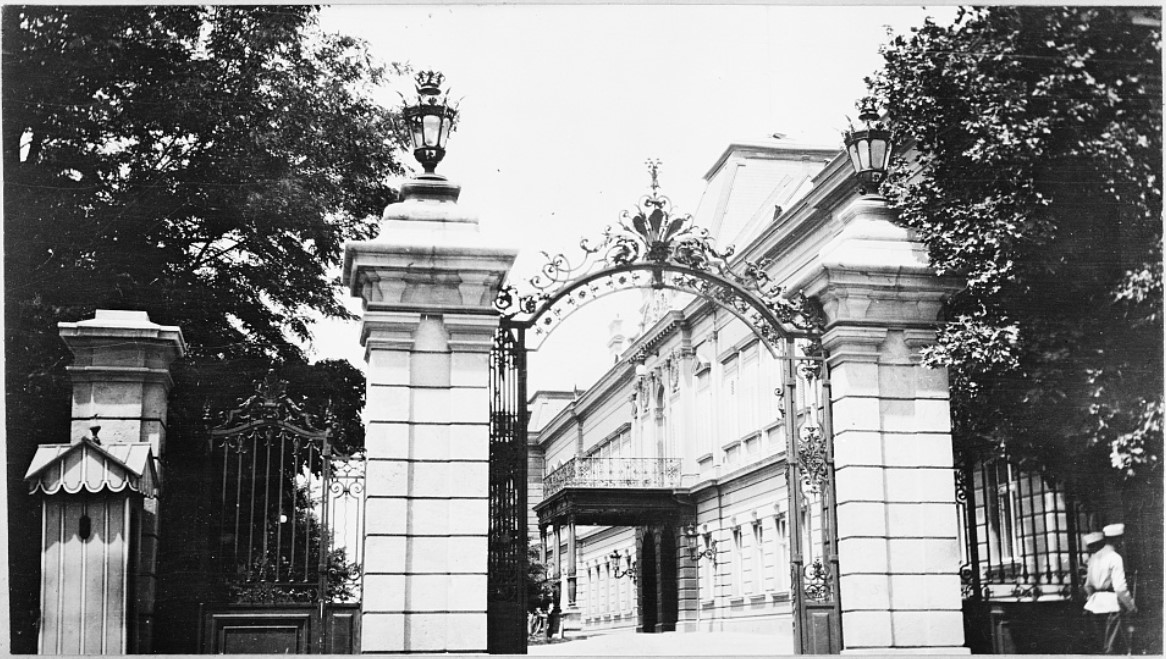
Another view of the entrance gate to the palace

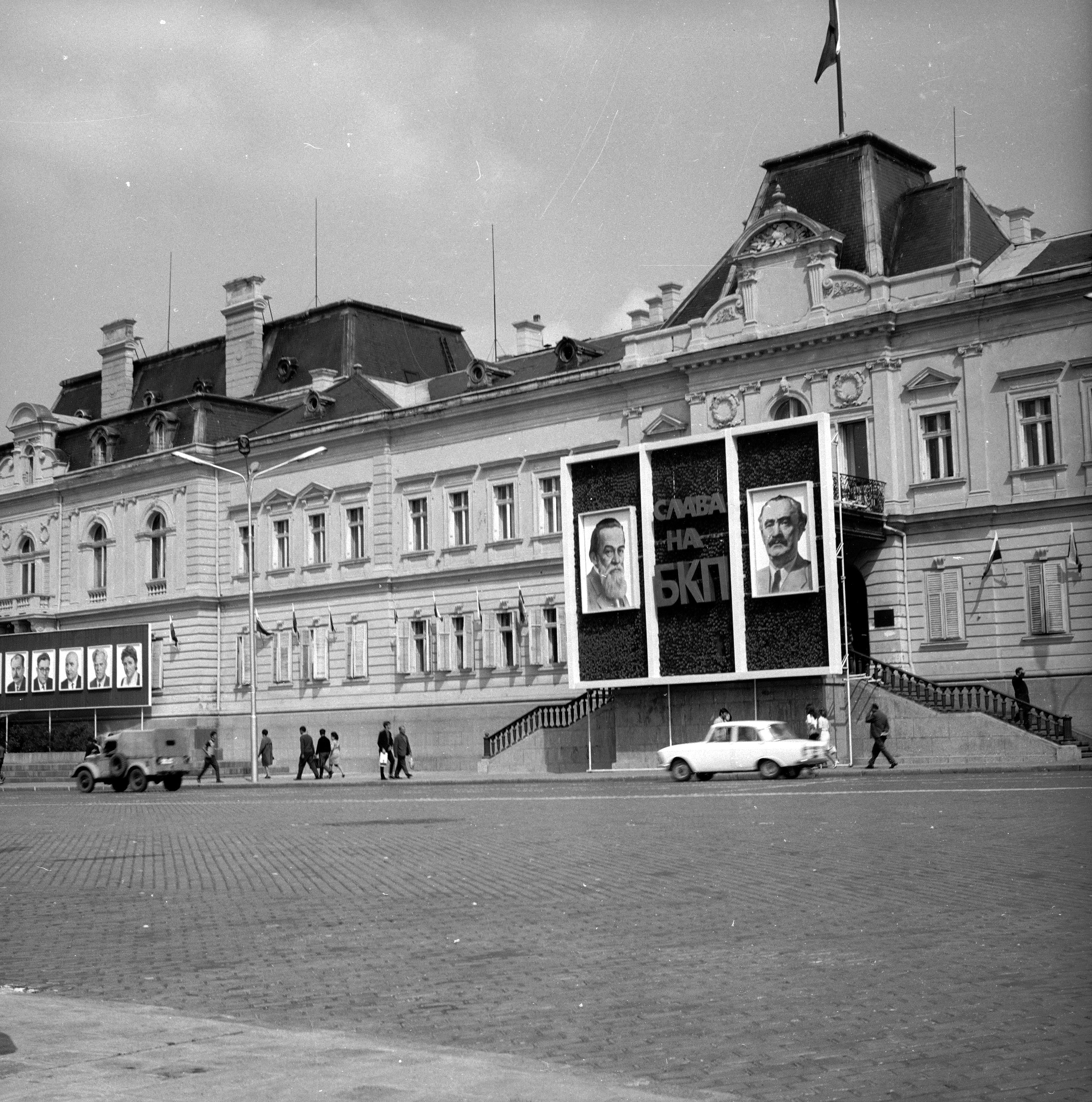
The Royal Palace in 1969, used as a backdrop to hang large posters of Bulgarian communist leaders

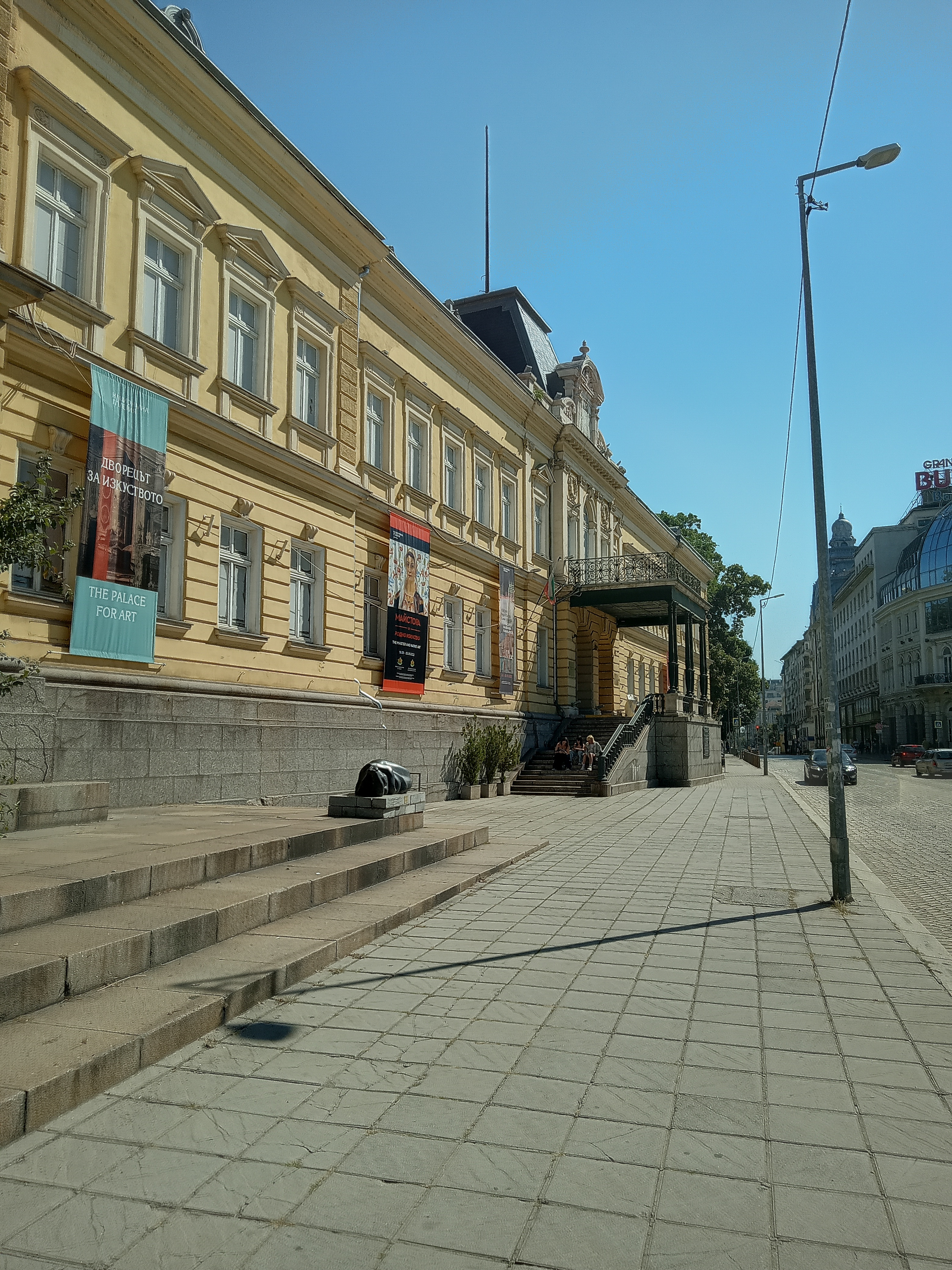
Front of the Royal Palace of Sofia, now with posters for museum exhibitions

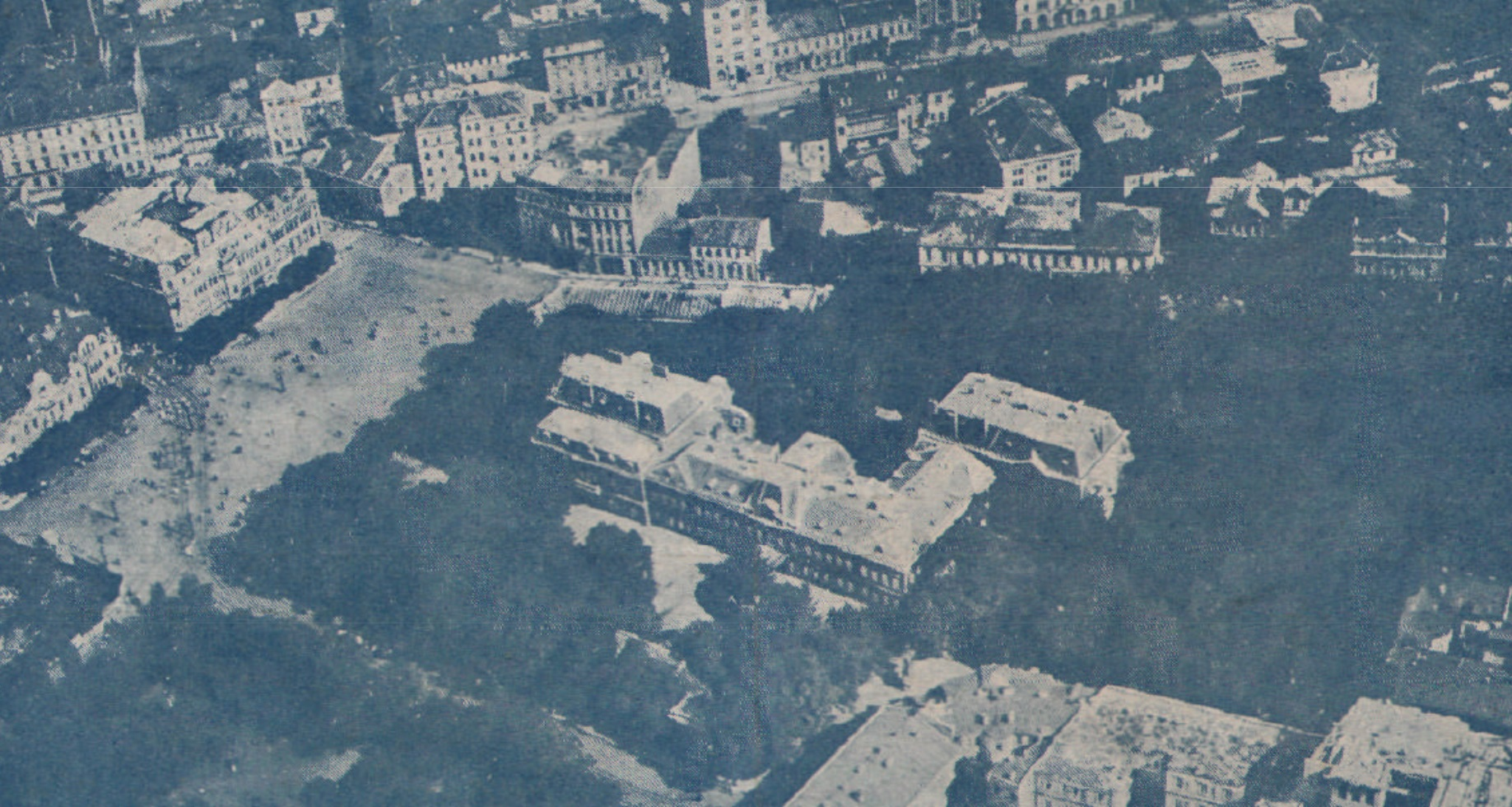
Birdview of the Royal Palace in 1929

=== Ottoman period ===
The location of the royal palace is on top of a hill. Starting from the 16th century, it accommodated the Konak, which served as both the administrative and residential center for the local Ottoman prefect. Unfortunately, the structure was ravaged by a fire in 1816, leading to its destruction. Subsequently, the area lay dormant and unused for an extended period.

Only between 1873 and 1875 a new Konak was erected—a two-story symmetrical building featuring projections at both ends. Below the Konak, dungeons were allocated for confinement. Through underground tunnels, the structure was connected to the nearby places such as the Chelebi Mosque, the Pasha's house, an inn (at the location of the old hotel ‘Bulgaria’).

=== From Konak to Princely Palace (1879–1887) ===
During the Russo-Turkish War of 1877–1878, the Konak served as a hospital. The 1878 Treaty of Berlin made Bulgaria an autonomous state, the Principality of Bulgaria, within the Ottoman Empire, with Sofia as capital. Although remaining under Ottoman sovereignty, the principality functioned independently, taking Alexander of Battenberg as its first prince in 1879. The Konak was designated as his official residence.

The National Assembly made funds available to transform the Konak into a princely residence. The building was quickly refurbished by the Russian army, but barely a year after its installation, it became clear that the structure was not suitable to house the prince and his family, who had to move to allow for a complete reconstruction.

From 1880 to 1882, the Austrian architect Viktor Rumpelmayer directed the reconstruction of the old konak, which was almost completely demolished, although the foundations were used to erect the new palace, which was also enlarged with an eastern wing for receptions. Likewise, all the façades were redone following the sumptuous and cosmopolitan Second Empire style with chateauesque connotations. The idea was to give the new princely residence a cosmopolitan air that would symbolize Sofia's transformation from an Ottoman provincial city to the capital of a newly independent state. In the execution of the project, Rumpelmayer was supported by the Austro-Hungarian architects Friedrich Grünanger, Antonín Kolář (also known as Adolf Václav Kolář), Jakob Heinrich Mayer and Leers.

The space were the demolished Konak stood, served as the residence of Prince Alexander I and a place of work, while the new extension of Rumpelmayer was used for parties and receptions and was organized on three floors: the ground floor for administrative functions, the first floor with the grand ballroom, the throne room, the gala dining room and a winter garden; and the second floor or attic for the service. An opening ceremony took place on 26 December 1882, with the advent of the new year 1883 marked by an unprecedented New Year's ball within the palace.

On 20 August 1886, a group of military men unhappy with the outcome of the Serbo-Bulgarian War (1886) stormed the palace and forced the prince to abdicate and then moved him to the border. However, Prince Alexander would return to the capital again, but having lost the support of Russia, he was forced to abdicate definitively on 8 September of the same year.

=== From Princely to Tsar's palace (1887–1946) ===
A few months after the fall of Alexander I, the representatives of the Third Great National Assembly, who held a meeting at Tarnovo, offered the throne to Prince Valdemar of Denmark, which he refused. Similarly, the assembly opposed the appointment of Niko I Dadiani, Prince of Mingrelia, proposed by Tsar Alexander III of Russia, as the new prince. On 7 July 1887, to the surprise of the chancelleries and the European courts, the assembly elected Ferdinand I of Saxe-Coburg-Kohary (1861–1948), son of princess Clémentine of Orléans and therefore grandson of the last king of France, Louis Philippe I, as the new prince.

European governments reacted with indifference, such as Austria or the Ottoman Empire, or with open hostility, such as Russia, but, on 7 August, Ferdinand left his castle in Ebenthal in Austria and traveled to Bulgaria. On the 16th he took the oath before the assembly at Tarnovo, and on the 23rd he entered Sofia, amidst the curiosity rather than enthusiasm of its inhabitants.

In the second construction stage, which started in 1894, the east wing of the palace was built, following the prince's wedding to Marie Louise (1870–1899). Viennese architect Friedrich Grünanger oversaw the construction, while sculptor Andreas Greiss was responsible for the decoration, which incorporated elements of Viennese Neo-Baroque and fin de siècle decoration inspired by the Louis XV and Louis XVI styles.

The new wing was completed in 1896 and included new quarters for the princely family, such as a library, reception rooms, a dining room, two winter gardens and a covered porte-cochère. A state-of-the-art electric elevator from the Schindler company was also installed, connecting the ground floor with the first floor. On the first floor were the apartments of Prince Ferdinand, Princess Maria Luisa as well as from the crown prince, the future king Boris III (1894–1943); on the second floor those of prince Kiril (1895–1945) and Princesses Eudoxia (1898–1985) and Nadezhda (1899–1958).

Friedrich Grünanger was supported by a wide range of artists such as the sculptor Andreas Greis and architects Franz Aisler, Anaki Shamardzhiev, Yordan Sevov, and Ivan Vassilov.

The ornate embellishments adorning the entire palace – including parapets on stairs and terraces, decorative grilles, fences, columns, internal stairs, and more – were meticulously crafted by prestigious Viennese firms "Rudolf Filip Wagner" and "Valerian Hillar", along with the renowned German establishment "Ed. Puls" based in Berlin. The metal facing adorning the fireplaces showcased the expertise of the French company A-ne M-on G. Laury. B-te S.G.D.E. à Paris. Furthermore, the opulent oak doors, featuring intricate marquetry designs composed of exotic wood, ivory, brass, silver, and gold, depicting regal crowns and personal princely emblems, were proudly marked with the insignia of the esteemed firm "Franz Michel" from Vienna.

Despite all these additions, the palace maintained a compact volume, with comfortable and well-thought-out internal communications, which allowed easy transit between the more institutional reception areas and the more domestic spaces of the princely family. Its total area was 5742.30 square meters, and it had 80 rooms. Until the First World War, the palace was the example to follow for all public and residential buildings in the Bulgarian capital.

Not to be forgotten is the garden, created as early as 1879, during the reign of Alexander I of Battenberg, who decided to plant a two-hectare park designed by Anton Kollar that surrounded the palace and was enclosed by a gate. At the west and east ends of the park, aligned with the streets, would be two large, elaborate gates. Its area was 17,690 square meters, and it was adorned with rare species of trees, shrubs and decorative plants.

During Christmas 1889, the Royal Palace featured Bulgaria's first Christmas Tree in an official celebration, under the auspices of princess Clémentine of Orléans. The tree was part of a lavish Christmas celebration at the palace, and was decorated by students from the schools in Sofia.

The princely family did not inhabit their palace in Sofia all year round, but in summer moved to Euxinograd on the Black Sea coast, while from 1903 onwards they made more and more use of the hunting lodge in Vrana, especially after its expansion in 1909, located on the outskirts of the capital.

In 1908, Prince Ferdinand I declared Bulgaria's independence from the Ottoman Empire, which until then had been its suzerain. Ferdinand proclaimed himself Tsar of the Bulgarians (Цар на българите); therefore the Prince's Palace was renamed Tsar's Palace from that date.

Although the palace had a Catholic chapel, the religion professed by both Ferdinand and his two successive wives, in 1912, for the coming of age of his eldest son and heir, Boris, it was decided to add an elaborate Orthodox chapel, the majority religion in Bulgaria. As early as 1893, Ferdinand had decided that Boris would be educated in the Orthodox religion, a constitutional obligation, as well as one of the conditions set by Tsar Nicholas II of Russia for the re-establishment of diplomatic relations broken since 1886. Such a decision earned him excommunication by Pope Leo XIII.

The orthodox chapel was positioned at the northeast rear side of the old wing. The adornment of the Orthodox chapel was enriched by contributions of artists Anton Mitov and Ivan Markvichka in 1897, as well as from Stefan Badzhov from 1912 to 1916.

After the defeat in World War I and Ferdinand's abdication, his son Boris III became the new Bulgarian monarch. Following his marriage to Princess Giovanna of Savoy (1907–2007), daughter of the Italian King Victor Emmanuel III, in October 1930, a thorough renovation and modernization of the palace was carried out. At the same time, the palace was no longer inhabited by Prince Kiril and Princess Eudoxia, Princess Nadezhda had married and lived in Germany since 1924.

In 1934, the far-right politician Kimon Georgiev, after staging a coup d'état, was appointed prime minister by the king in the palace. During the Second World War, Bulgaria aligned itself with the Axis powers, with the aim of gaining the region of Macedonia lost during the Second Balkan War and World War I. In 1942, faced with the deteriorating military situation, the royal family moved to live in Vrana Palace, in the outskirts of Sofia, and Tsarska Bistritsa, a hunting lodge in the Rila Mountains near Borovets.

Shortly after returning from a visit to Germany, king Boris III unexpectedly died at the age of 49 at 28 August 1943. It is believed the king died from poisoning. Boris was succeeded by his six-year-old son king Simeon II, under a Regency Council headed by Boris's brother prince Kiril.

In 1944, another coup d'état brought the pro-communist Fatherland Front to power and Kimon Georgiev, now aligned with the communists, became prime minister again.

A gradual purging of the royalist symbols of the Royal Palace began, while the boy-king Simeon II and his family remained in Vrana. In 1946, in the controversial referendum organized by the Fatherland Front government, Bulgarians voted 95% in favor of the republic, the royal family left the country soon after.

=== Government Headquarters (1946–1953) ===
Following the abolition of the monarchy and the proclamation of the republic on 15 September 1946, the palace became the seat of the Council of Ministers of the People's Republic of Bulgaria and the Higher Party School, along with serving as a temporary residence for newly appointed state officials. Swiftly, the palace hall underwent modifications for the office of the new Prime Minister, Georgi Dimitrov (1882–1949). This transformation involved dismantling and destroying all panelling, with the remaining surfaces coated in whitewash. In 1946, the palace fence met a similar fate, and the palace park was left open and neglected.

In July 1949, during the construction of Georgi Dimitrov Mausoleum, the park alley in front of the palace was eradicated. This alteration resulted in the formation of a broad square, the current Battenberg Square, accompanied by a lowering of the surrounding terrain by approximately two meters. The mausoleum was demolished in 1999.

Regrettably, the majority of the palace interior succumbed to destruction during these events. The subsequent internal restructuring took on a primitive form: the interiors were boarded up with planks and plywood, haphazardly coated with whitewash.

=== Museum compound (since 1953) ===
In 1953, as per decision of the Council of Ministers, the former royal palace was handed over to the National Art Gallery and the National Ethnographic Museum. The building was assigned the status of a cultural monument in 1978.

The main part of the National (Art) Gallery is located in the left part of the central building and the farther wing created by Viktor Rumpelmayer. While the National Ethnographic Museum is located in the north-eastern wing created by king Ferdinand I. It primarily exhibits works by Bulgarian artists created between the 19th century and the present.

The Ethnographic Museum is situated in the right part of the central building and the farther wing.

== An unrealized plan for a new palace in Sofia ==
After his coronation in 1908, King Ferdinand envisioned constructing a grand European-style palace in Sofia, reflecting his royal aspirations. He selected the King's Garden, a 35-acre area established in 1880 by Prince Alexander Battenberg, known for its botanical beauty and rare plant species. The garden was a prominent feature of Sofia, cultivated with the personal involvement of Ferdinand and numerous architects and gardeners.

Architect George Fingov proposed a Secession-style design, featuring a decorative cast-iron fence with stone columns. The palace itself was to rival renowned European landmarks like the Tuileries Palace, the Palace of Versailles, and the Belvedere in Vienna. Ferdinand envisioned modern amenities, including a steam-heated basement, refrigeration facilities, and extensive storage areas. The main floor was to include grand reception rooms, a throne room, a concert hall, and specialized spaces such as a smoking lounge, flag room, and library. The palace design also included chapels for Eastern Orthodox and Roman Catholic worship, reflecting the king's personal interests.

The upper floors were reserved for the royal apartments, including an opulent suite for the king, covering 570 square meters, and a similarly grand apartment for Queen Eleanor. Additional apartments for heirs, dignitaries, and guests were meticulously planned, alongside servant quarters, which numbered in the dozens. A secondary building was also designed to host a historical museum, workshops, and greenhouses.

Despite an ambitious design by the renowned architect Nikola Lazarov, the onset of the First World War and subsequent political and economic upheavals prevented the palace's construction. The site remained unused for many years. In 1934, it was repurposed for a royal nursery, designed by prominent Bulgarian architects.

Following the abolition of the monarchy after the communist coup, the King's Garden was destroyed and replaced by a monument to the Soviet Army. However, elements of Fingov's original design, including the cast-iron fence, were later incorporated into the Lozenets residence, where they can still be admired today.

=== Gallery: The design for a new palace by Nikola Lazarov (Bulgarian Archives State Agency) ===
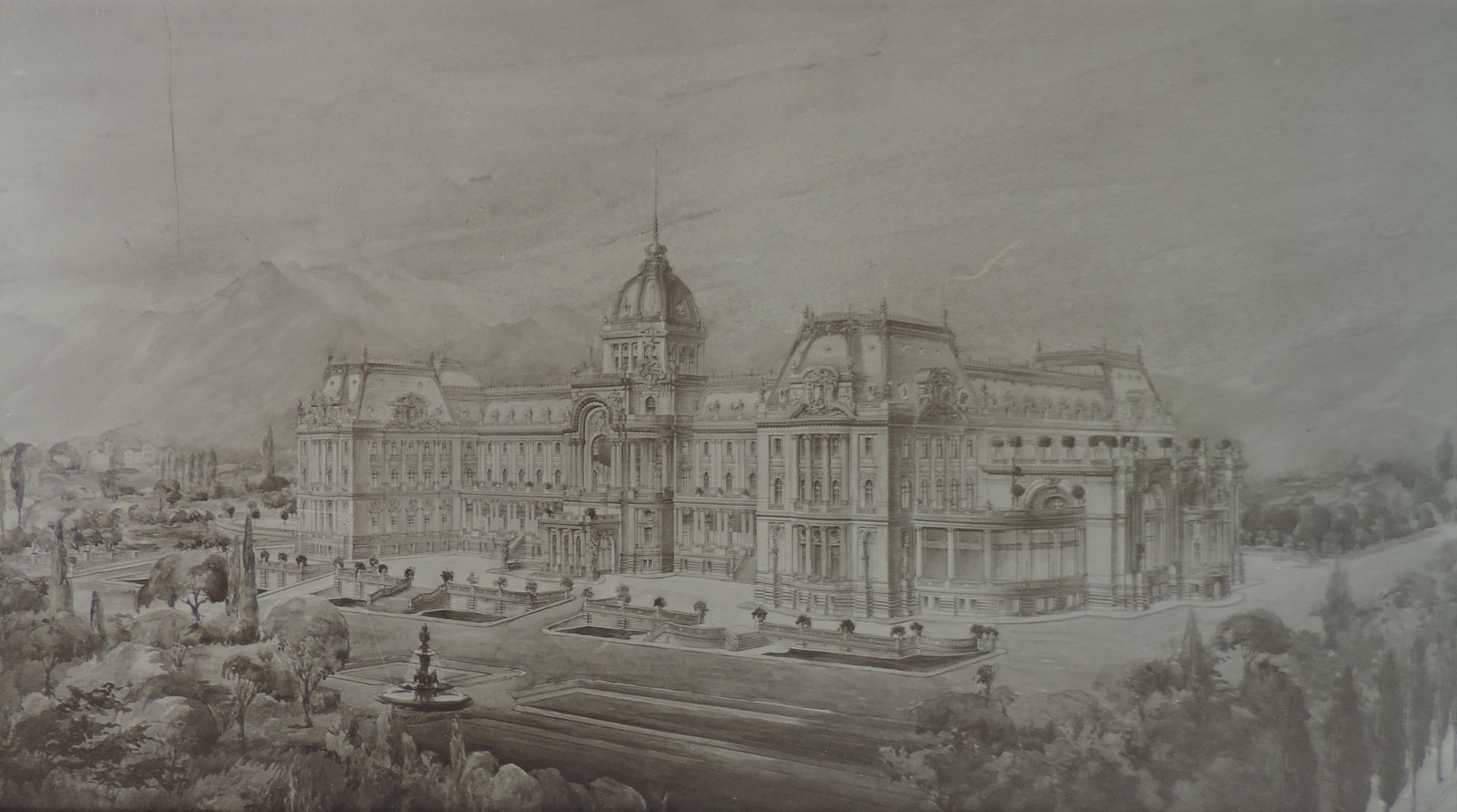

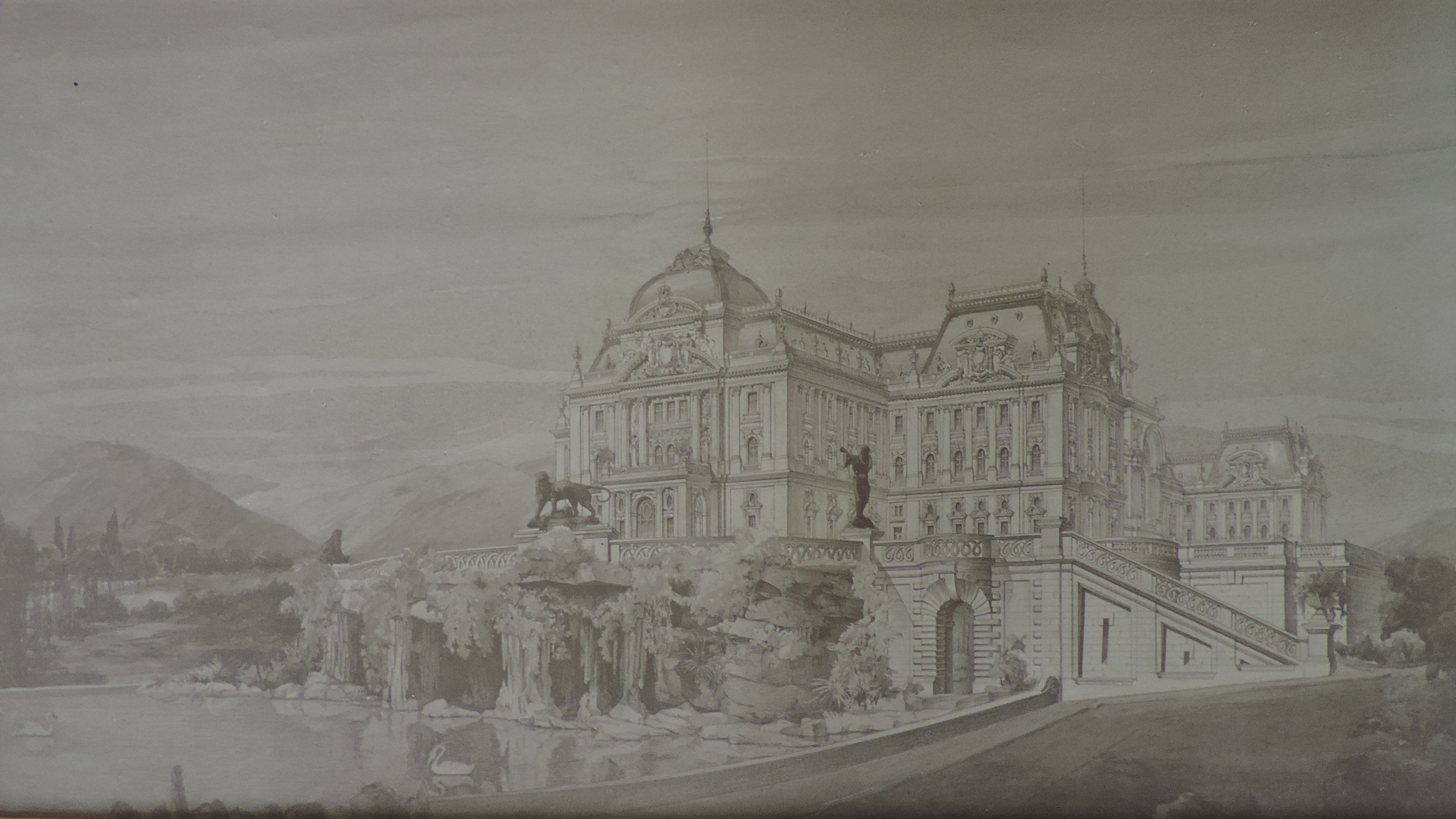

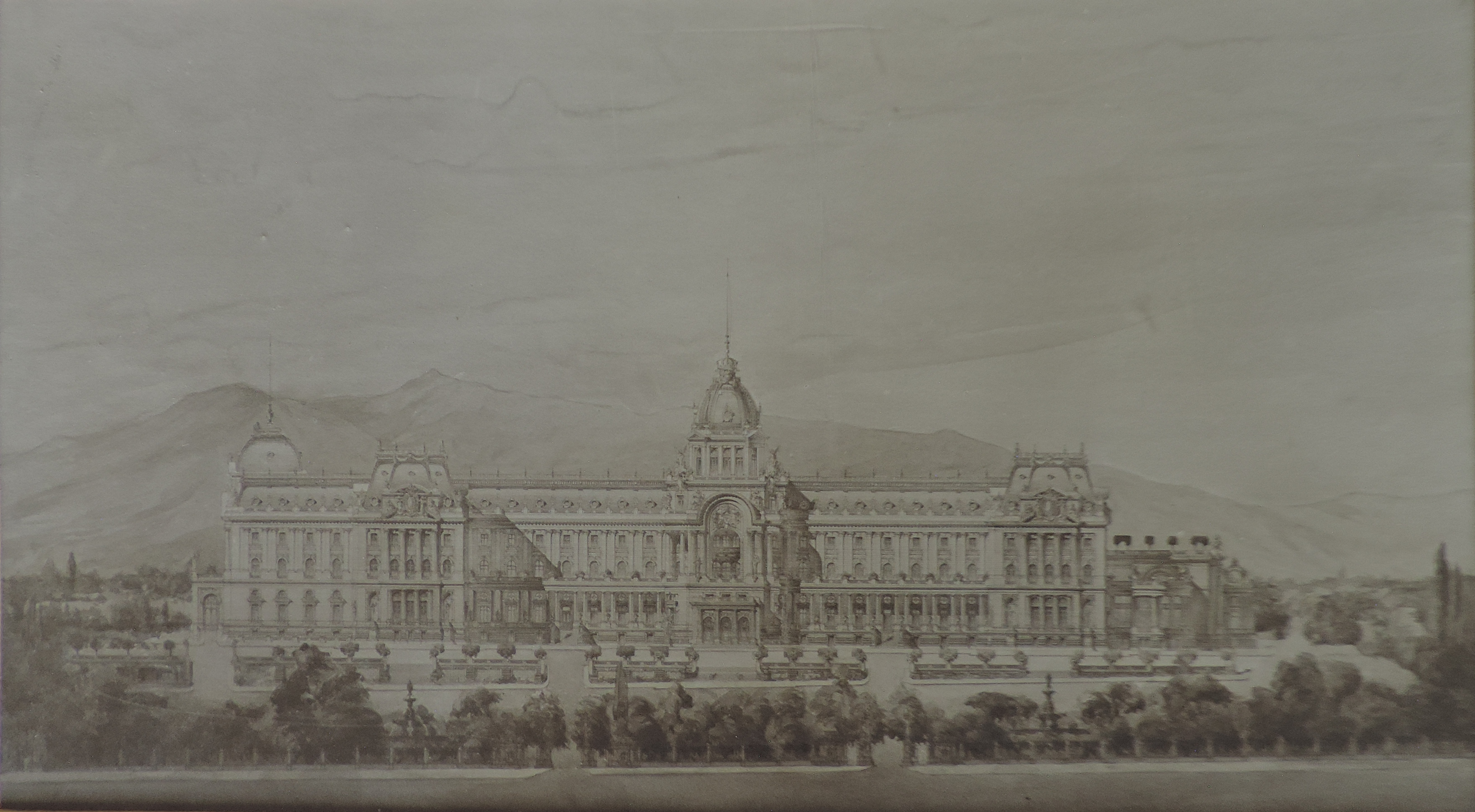

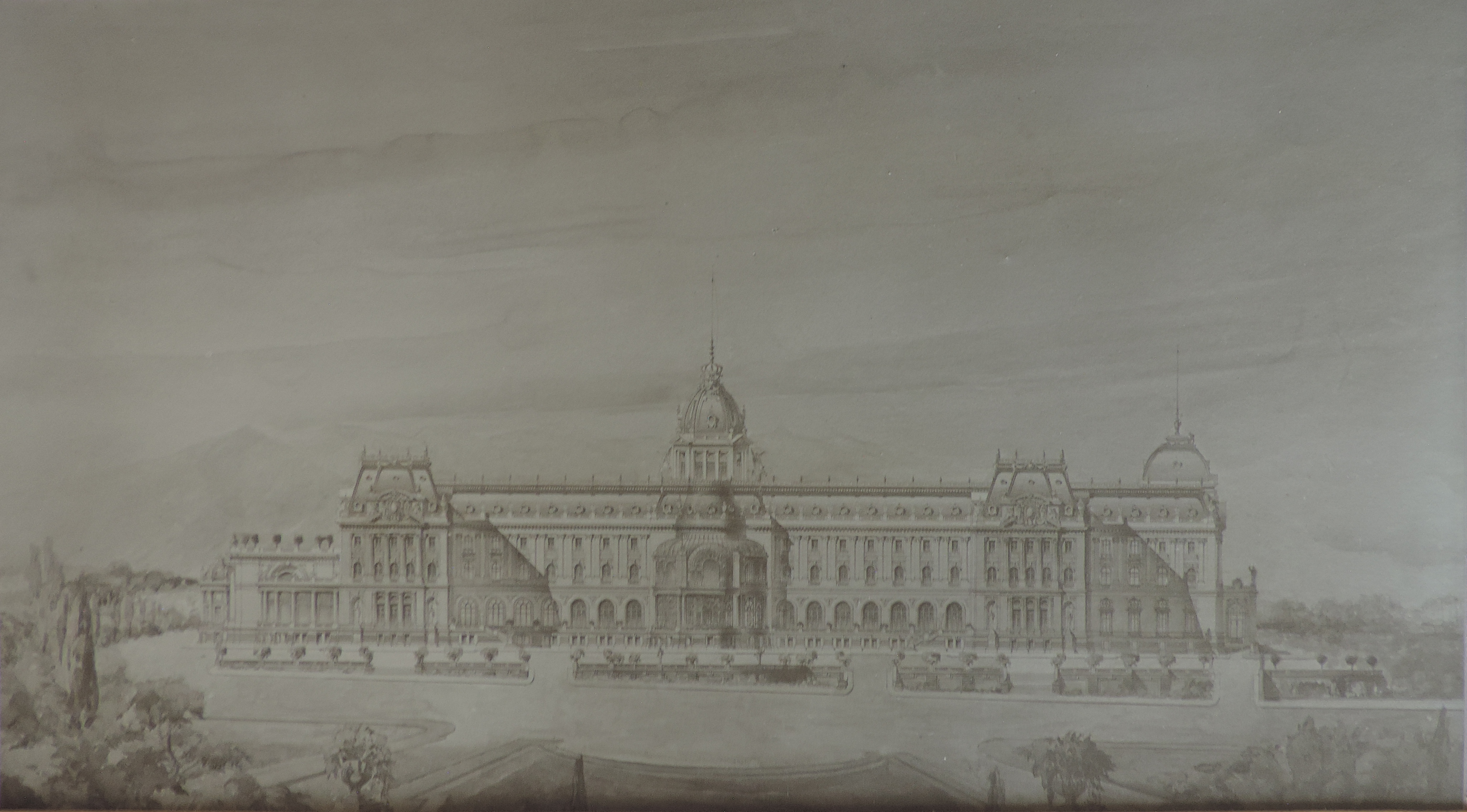

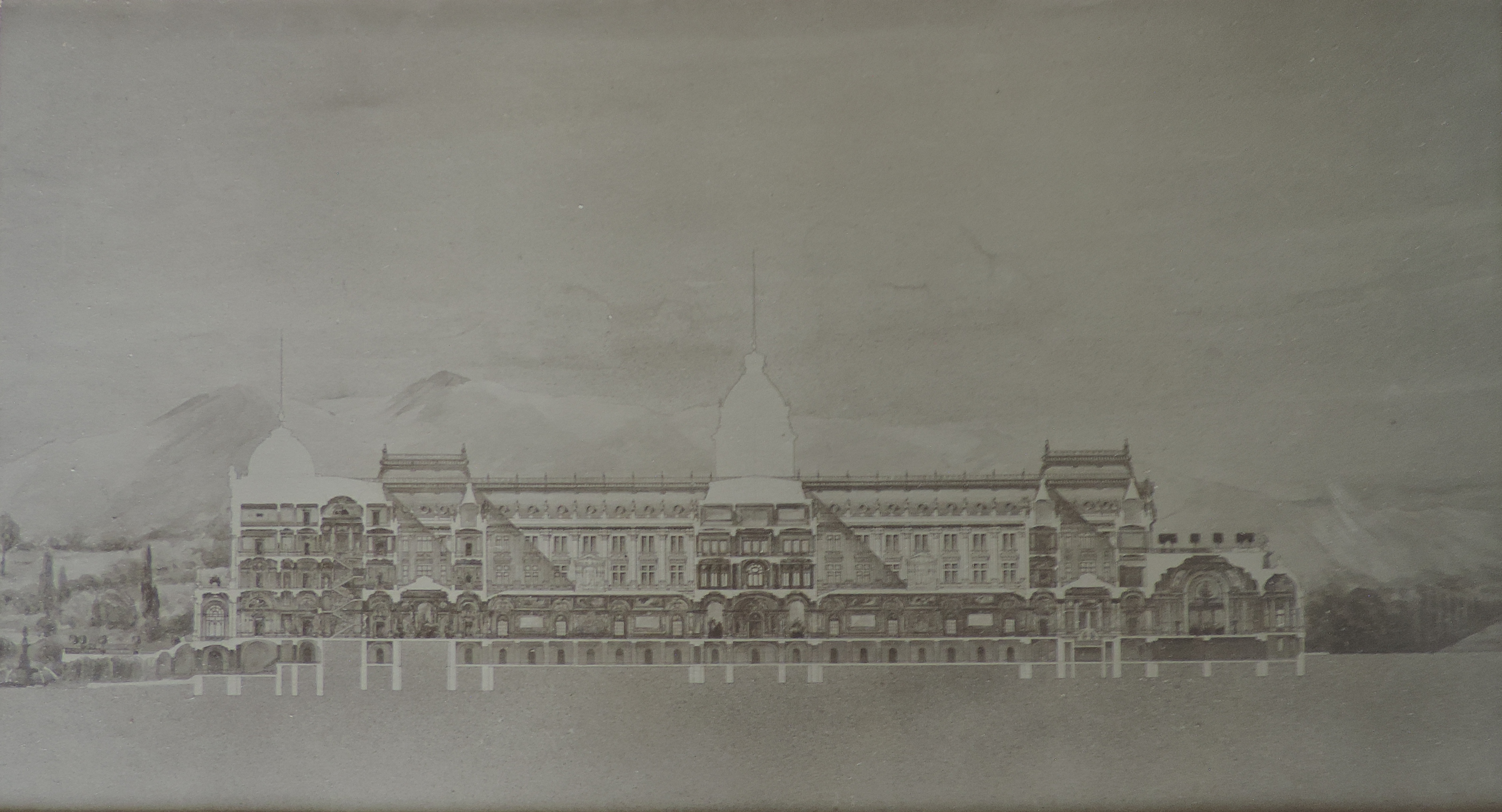

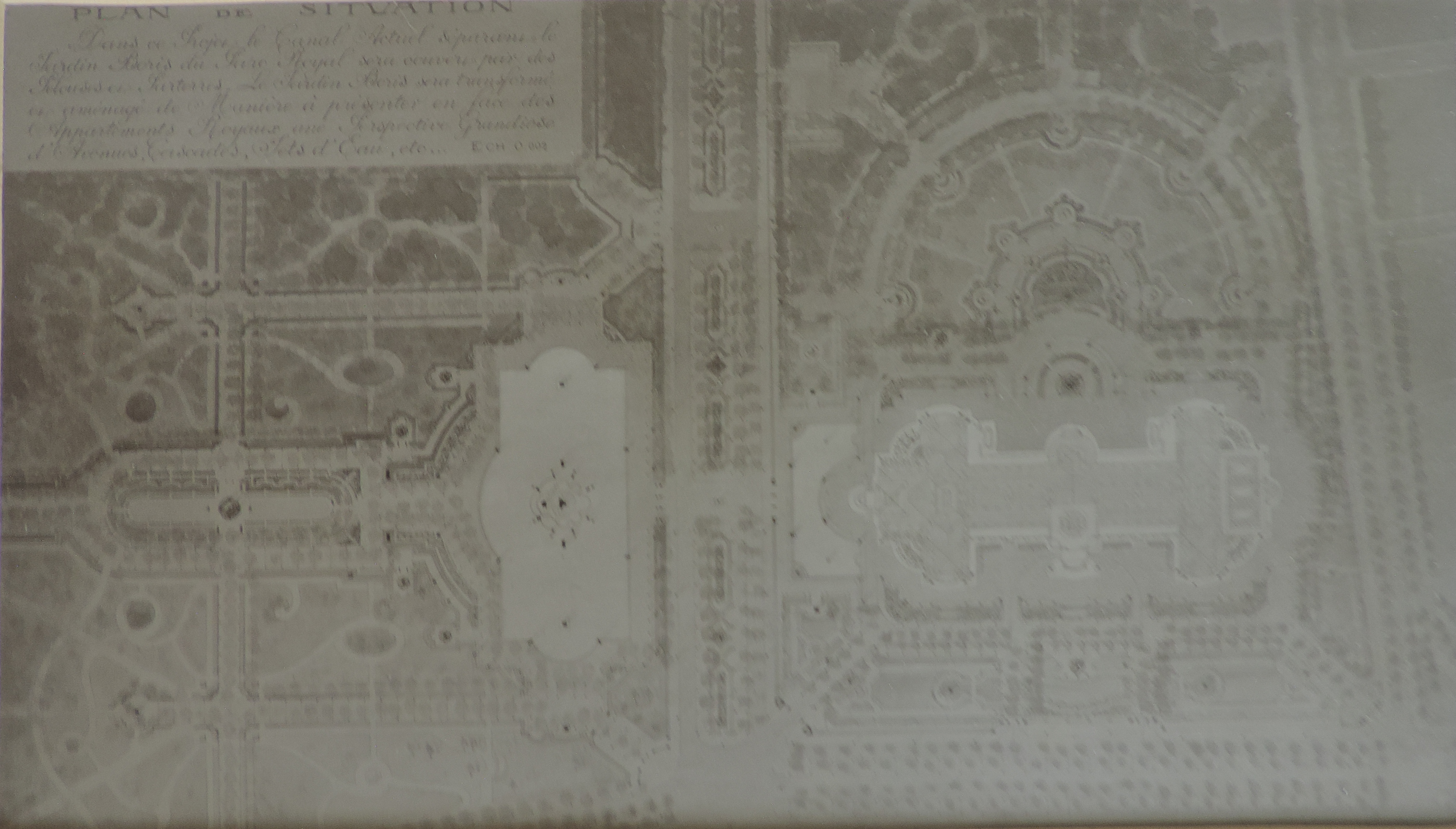

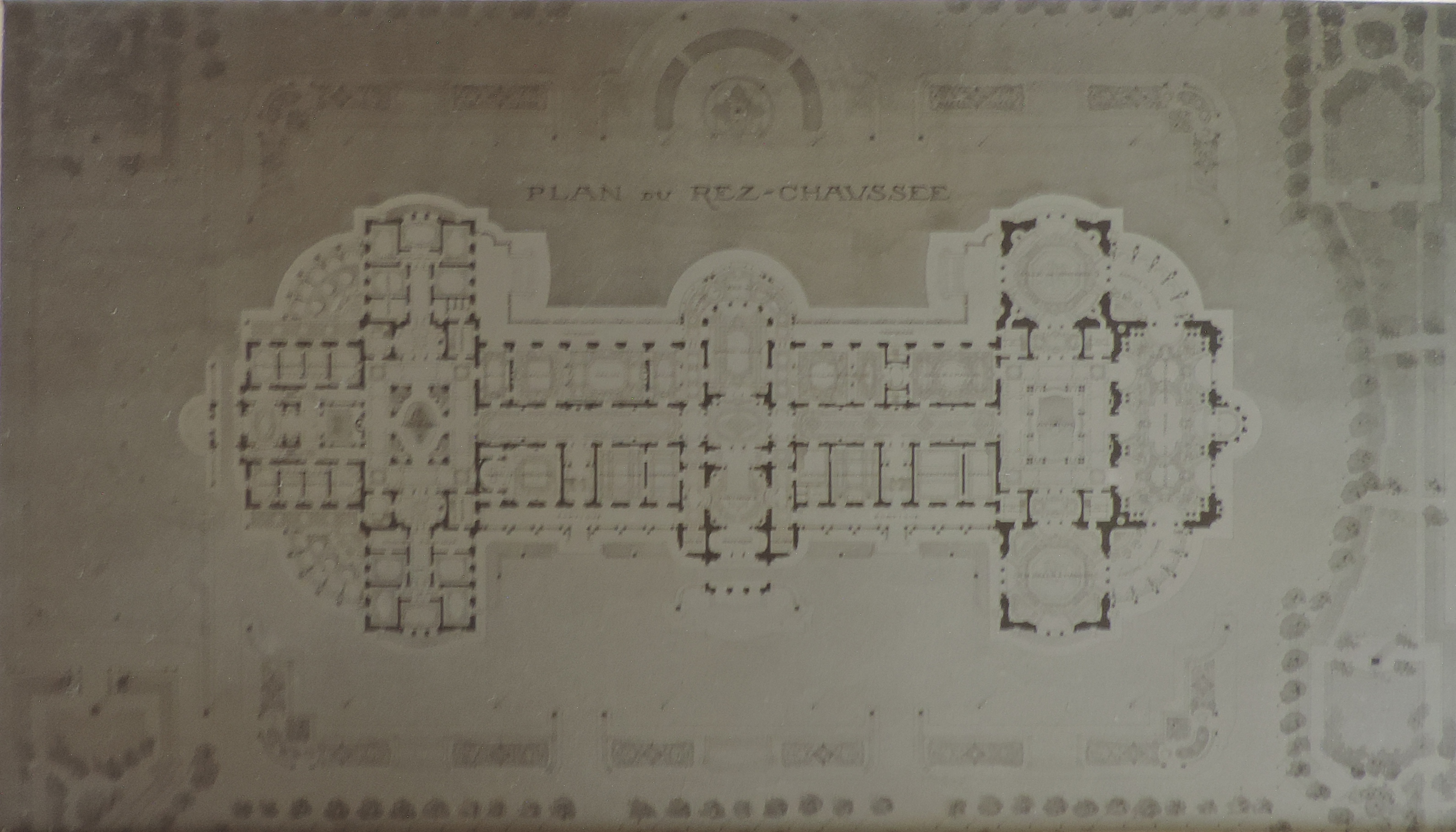

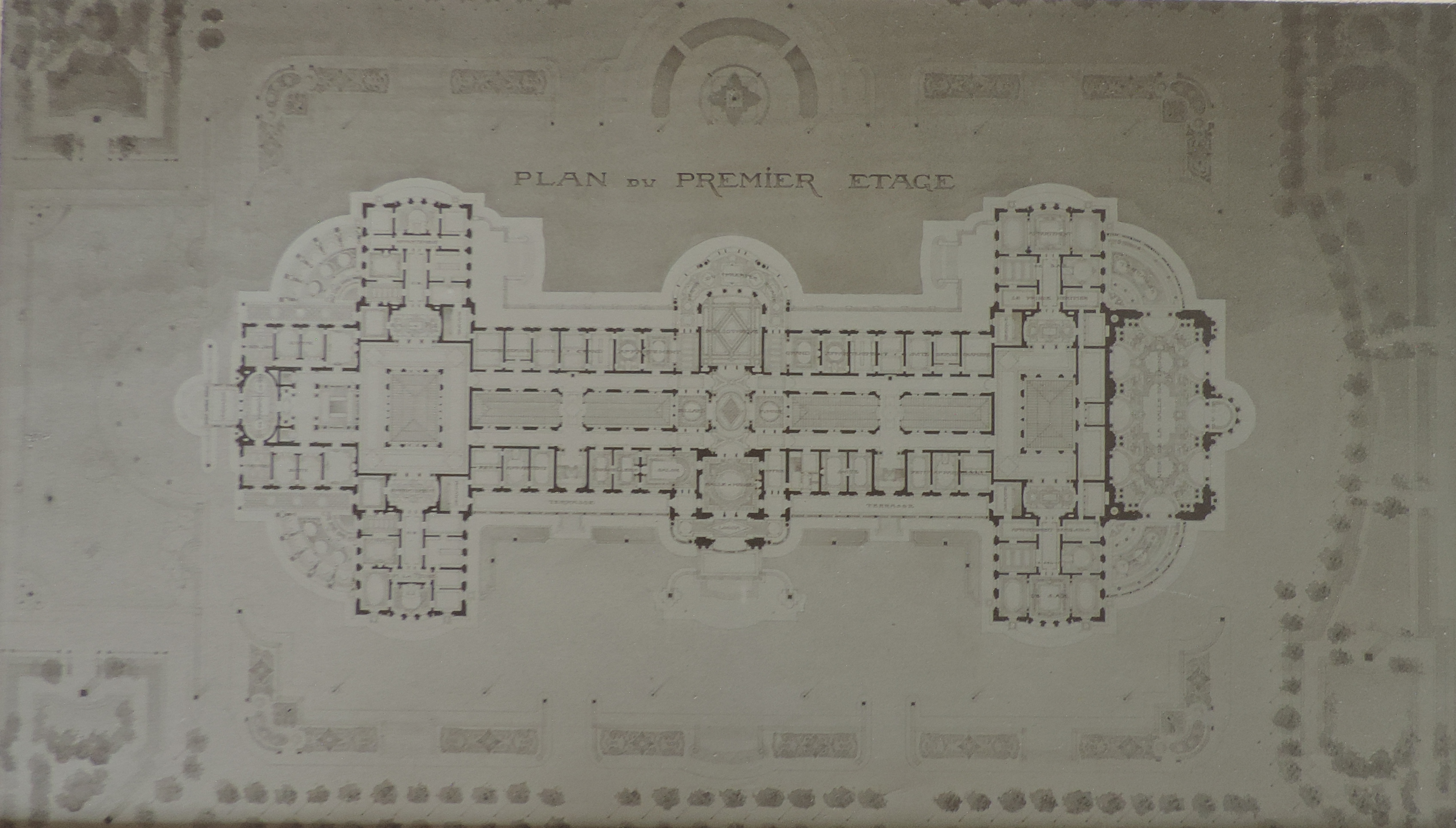

== Literature ==
- Кратка история на българската архитектура (A brief history of Bulgarian architecture) (in Bulgarian). Sofia: Ban. 1965. p. 628.
- Doytchinov, Grigor; Gantchev, Christo (2001). Österreichische Architekten in Bulgarien 1878-1918 (in German). Vienna: Böhlau. p. 234. ISBN 3205993438.
- Tsenov, Yasen (2018). Българските дворци - от кан Аспарух до цар Борис III (in Bulgarian). Sofia: Колхида. p. 104. ISBN 9789546722478.
- Böttcher, Hans-Joachim (2019). Ferdinand von Sachsen-Coburg und Gotha 1861–1948: Ein Kosmopolit auf dem bulgarischen Thron (in German). Berlin: Anthea Verlag. ISBN 9783899982961.
- Milchev, Lyubomir (2021). Тайни на софийския царски дворец / Secrets of The Sofia Royal Palace (in Bulgarian and English). Sofia: Арт Етърнал синема. p. 112. ISBN 9786191916139.
- Митева, Жанет (2024). История на Царския дворец в София (in Bulgarian). Sofia: Faber. p. 544. ISBN 9786190017714.
