= Sirak, Lorestan =

Sirak سيرك
- Village
- Location within Iran
- Coordinates: 33°26′19″N 48°42′52″E
- Country: Iran
- Province: Lorestan
- County: Khorramabad
- Bakhsh: Zagheh
- Rural District: Zagheh

Population (2006)
  - Total: 76
- Time zone: UTC+3:30 (IRST)
  - Summer (DST): UTC+4:30 (IRDT)

Sirak (Persian: سيرك, also Romanized as Sīrak; also known as Sīrkeh) is a village in Zagheh Rural District, Zagheh District, Khorramabad County, Lorestan Province, Iran. At the 2006 census, its population was 76, in 19 families.
