= Shanbarak =

Shanbarak شنبرك
- Village
- Location within Iran
- Coordinates: 36°03′18″N 49°58′44″E
- Country: Iran
- Province: Qazvin
- County: Buin Zahra
- Bakhsh: Dashtabi
- Rural District: Dashtabi-ye Sharqi

Population (2006)
  - Total: 272
- Time zone: UTC+3:30 (IRST)
  - Summer (DST): UTC+4:30 (IRDT)

Shanbarak (Persian: شنبرك, also Romanized as Shenbarak; also known as Chambarak, Chamrak, and Shīrak) is a village in Dashtabi-ye Sharqi Rural District, Dashtabi District, Buin Zahra County, Qazvin Province, Iran. At the 2006 census, its population was 272, in 73 families.
