= Sirak Skitnik =

Bulgarian artist

Sirak Skitnik was a Bulgarian painter. He died in the year 1943, but his piece of Art called "Mountain View" was first auctioned at Rakursi Auction House in the year 2017.
