= Sirak Beyene =

Eritrean-English footballer

Personal information
- Full name: Sirak Beyene Tsehaye
- Date of birth: 20 October 1996 (age 30)
- Place of birth: England
- Height: 1.76 m (5 ft 9 in)
- Positions: Forward; winger

Senior career*
Years	Team	Apps	(Gls)
2011	Íþróttafélagið Huginn	5	(0)
2013–	London Tigers F.C.		
- CB Hounslow United F.C.

International career
2013	Eritrea	3	(0)
- * Club domestic league appearances and goals

Shirak Beyene (born 20 October 1996 in England) is an Eritrean-English footballer. He is an Eritrea international.

== Career ==
=== Iceland ===
Shown the red card on the 59th minute as Huginn fell 0–2 to Magni mid-2011, Beyene had to sit out for the next matchup.

=== International ===
He was capped three times for Eritrea in 2013. On the Eritrean internationals going missing after each away game, he stated that the situation was not conducive to football and that the Eritrean National Football Federation would have to start from scratch every time.
