= List of museums in Bulgaria =

This is a list of museums in Bulgaria.

== Museums ==
- Boris Georgiev City Art Gallery
- Bulgarian torpedo boat Drazki
- Earth and Man National Museum
- Etar Architectural-Ethnographic Complex
- Kaliopa House
- Konaka Museum
- Kordopulov House
- Krastata Kazarma
- Museum of Mosaics, Devnya
- National Art Gallery (Bulgaria)
- National Archaeological Museum (Bulgaria)
- National Gallery for Foreign Art
- National Historical Museum (Bulgaria)
- National Museum of Military History (Bulgaria)
- National Museum of Natural History (Bulgaria)
- National Polytechnical Museum
- National Transport Museum, Bulgaria
- Neolithic Dwellings Museum
- Nesebar Archaeological Museum
- Pazardzhik History Museum
- Pleven Panorama
- Pleven Regional Historical Museum
- Plovdiv Regional Ethnographic Museum
- Plovdiv Regional Historical Museum
- Radetzky (steamship)
- Rousse Regional Historical Museum
- Sofia Regional Historical Museum
- Svetlin Rusev Donative Exhibition
- Varna Aquarium
- Varna Archaeological Museum
- Wine Museum (Pleven)

== See also ==
- List of museums
- Tourism in Bulgaria
- Culture of Bulgaria
