= Joseph Oberbauer =

Austrian and Bulgarian painter (1853–1926)

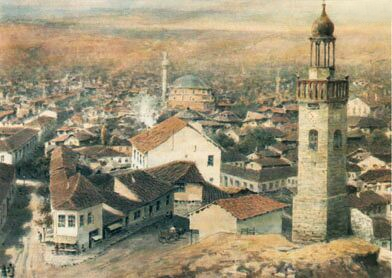
Joseph Oberbauer, Sofia with the clock tower

Joseph Sebastian Oberbauer (Bulgarian: Йозеф Себастиан Обербауер or Йосиф Себастиан Обербауер; 3 October 1853, St. Leonhard – 14 June 1926, Sofia) was an Austrian and Bulgarian painter and engineer.

Oberbauer was born in Sankt Leonhard^{[a]} in the Alpine region of Tyrol in the Austrian Empire. He attended a primary school in his hometown and finished high school in Innsbruck. Having demonstrated artistic talent in his childhood years, Oberbauer's desire was to enroll at the Academy of Fine Arts in the imperial capital Vienna. However, his father insisted that he study engineering. Three years into Oberbauer's education at the University of Graz, his father died and he dropped out.

Out of financial necessity, Oberbauer offered some of his watercolour paintings depicting the old town part of Graz to the local municipality. Oberbauer's work appealed to the municipality, which encouraged him to study at the Academy of Fine Arts in Vienna. However, he was again forced to drop out after two years due to financial difficulties. He spent some time working as a teacher and unsuccessfully attempted to continue his studies.

In 1889, Oberbauer arrived in Sofia, the capital of the newly liberated Principality of Bulgaria, where he joined the Cadastral Office of the municipality. Oberbauer took an active part in the creation of Sofia's first cadastral map. Afterward he briefly worked at Bulgaria's Construction of State Railways and Harbours Office, though he returned to a municipal job due to layoffs. Oberbauer remained at the Sofia Municipality for the rest of his life.

Besides being a municipality official, Oberbauer was actively engaged in art in Bulgaria. Impressed by the ambience of Sofia, he left behind numerous paintings of the newly liberated Bulgarian lands, with their still-oriental features, antique architecture and ancient ruins. Oberbauer's works are accurate depictions of Bulgaria's (and particularly Sofia's) appearance in the early post-Ottoman period, capturing the characteristic features of the age and location. Oberbauer's paintings depict the churches, monasteries, mosques, inns, markets and streets of late-19th-century Bulgaria. 70 of Oberbauer's works depicting the urban landscape of Sofia are part of the future Museum of Sofia's collection, to be exhibited in the Sofia Public Mineral Baths building.

A small street in Lozenets, Sofia located in the surroundings of the Sofia Seminary is named Joseph Oberbauer Street in his honour. One of the American College of Sofia's full scholarships also bears his name.

== Notes and references ==
a.	The Sankt Leonhard in question may be either Sankt Leonhard im Pitztal in North Tyrol, modern Austria, or St. Leonhard in Passeier in South Tyrol, modern Italy.
