= Yablanski House =

- къща на Яблански (in Bulgarian)
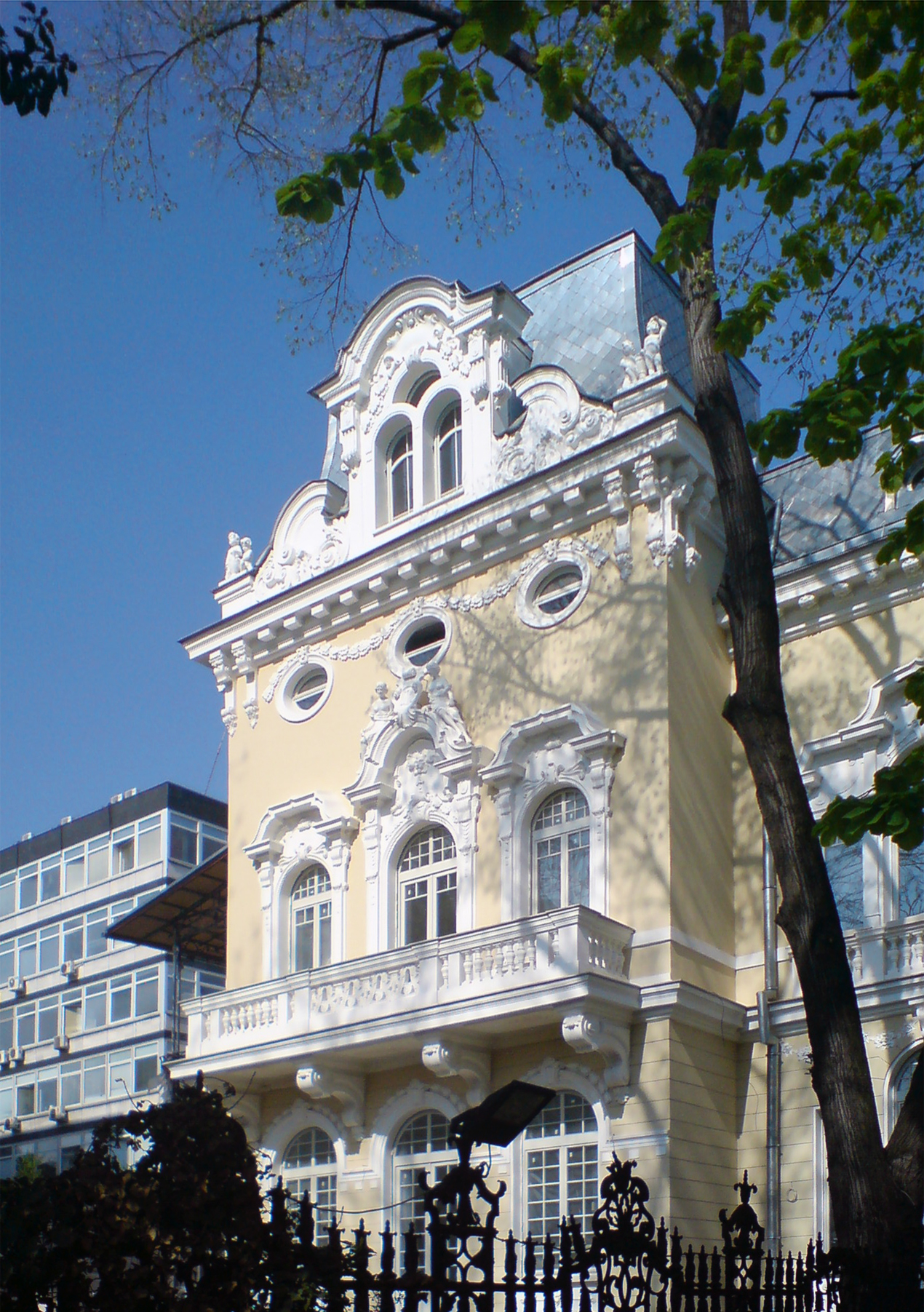
- The left facade of the Yablanski House
- Interactive map of the Yablanski House area

General information
- Type: house
- Architectural style: Neo-Baroque
- Location: Sofia, Bulgaria
- Coordinates: 42°41′35″N 23°20′0″E
- Construction started: 1906
- Completed: 1907

Design and construction
- Architect: Friedrich Grünanger

The Yablanski House (Bulgarian: къща на Яблански, kashta na Yablanski) is a Neo-Baroque house in Sofia, the capital of Bulgaria, situated at 18 Tsar Osvoboditel Boulevard in the city centre and regarded as one of the highest achievements of the city's architecture in the first decade of the 20th century. The building was proclaimed a monument of culture in 1955. After years of being uninhabited and in a bad condition due to mismanagement, in 2011 it underwent extensive reconstruction and since then has hosted an exclusive private club.

The Yablanski House was built in 1906–1907 to the designs of Austro-Hungarian architect Friedrich Grünanger (1856–1929) on the order of the wealthy financier and former mayor of Sofia Dimitar Yablanski (1859–1924). The exterior decoration was the work of the royal decorator of the Bulgarian royal family, Andreas Greis. Architecturally, the house was designed in the Baroque style with some Renaissance elements, with the interior stucco done in the Rococo style. The mansard floor is an important feature of the house's artistic design, together with the balcony railings of wrought iron and the several female sculptures. The furniture and the materials were specially supplied from Vienna. The house's architecture draws heavily from an earlier work of Grünanger's, the Royal Palace in Sofia. Notably, the architect's home in Salzburg, where he later moved and subsequently died, is almost identical to the Yablanski House.

After the Bulgarian coup d'état of 1944 and the establishment of a Communist government, the house was nationalized and used as the embassy of the People's Republic of China until 1991. After 1991, it was given back to the heirs of Yablanski who proceeded to sell it to First Private Bank. In 1996, the bank went bankrupt and the Yablanski House changed numerous owners. In the early 2000s, it was owned by Draft EOOD, who intended to build at 46-metre building at its place, a project halted by the Capital Municipal Council.

In 2006, the Yablanski House was included in the list of collapsing buildings; despite the efforts of the Capital Municipal Council, its owners have not undertaken its restoration. As of June 2009, the house was being reconstructed and since 2011 has hosted a private club with a restaurant, bar and music venue.

== Gallery ==
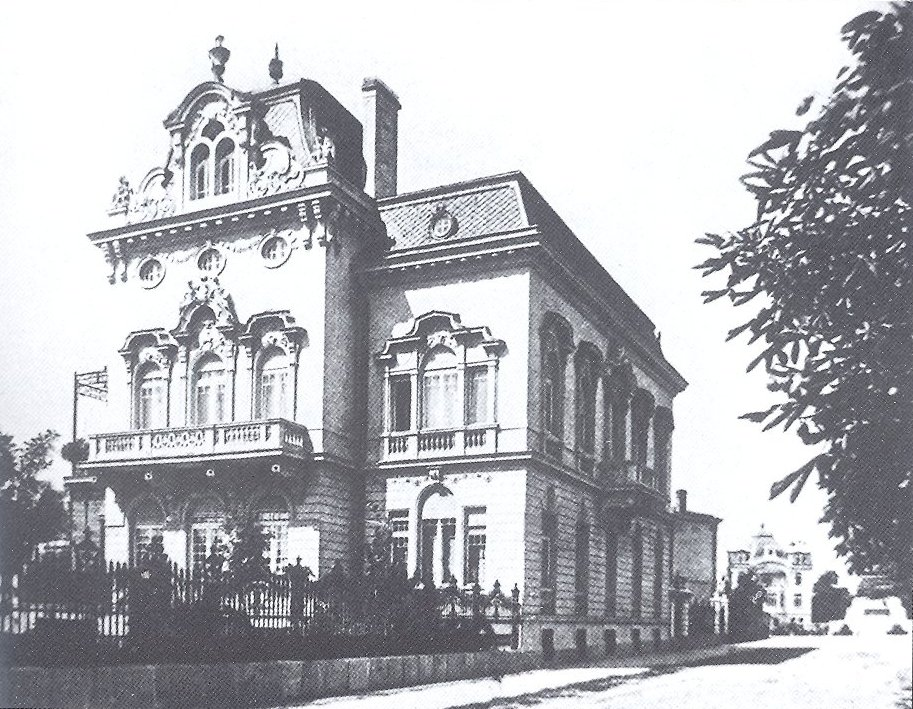
The Yablanski House around 1920

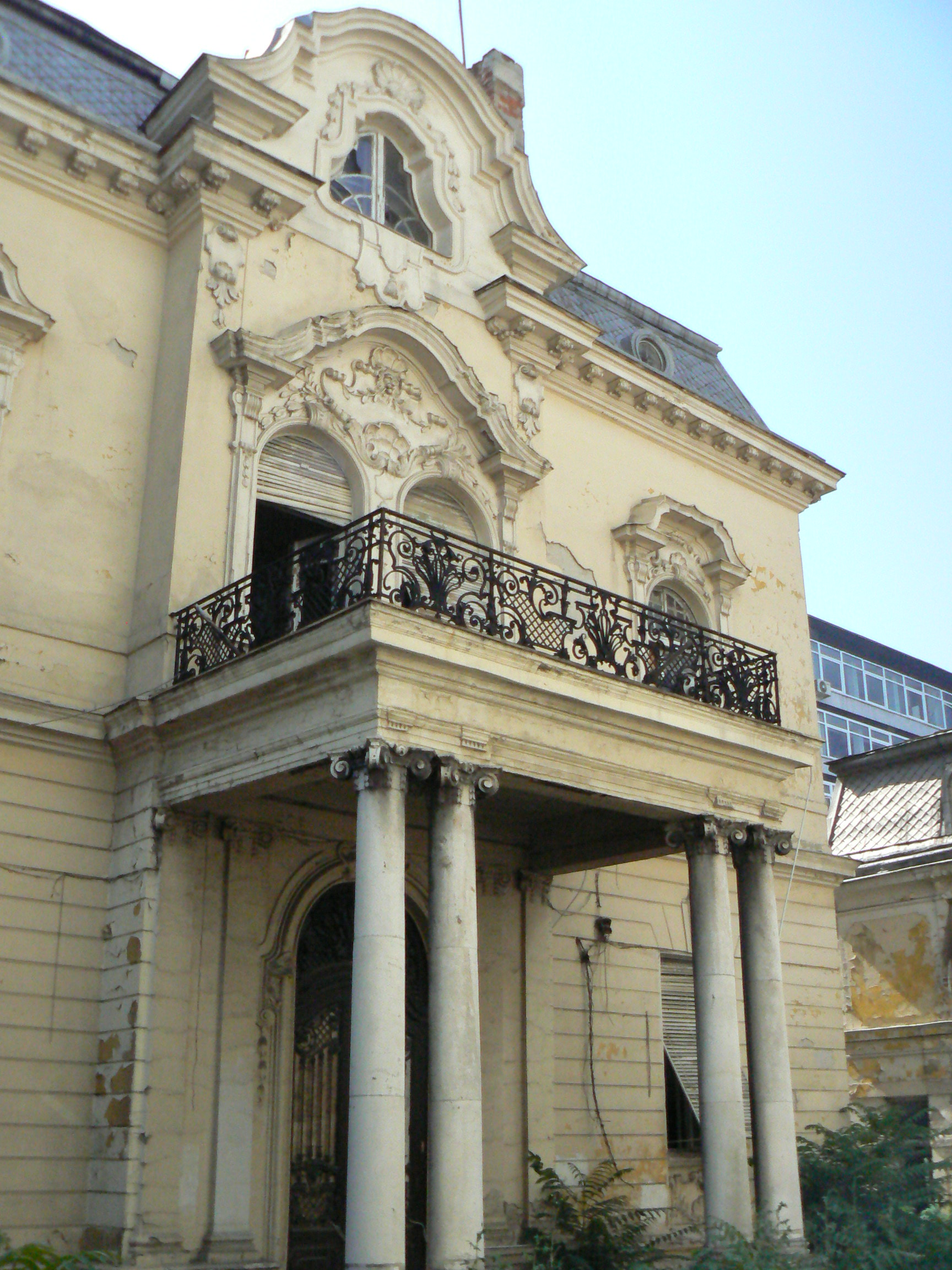
The veranda

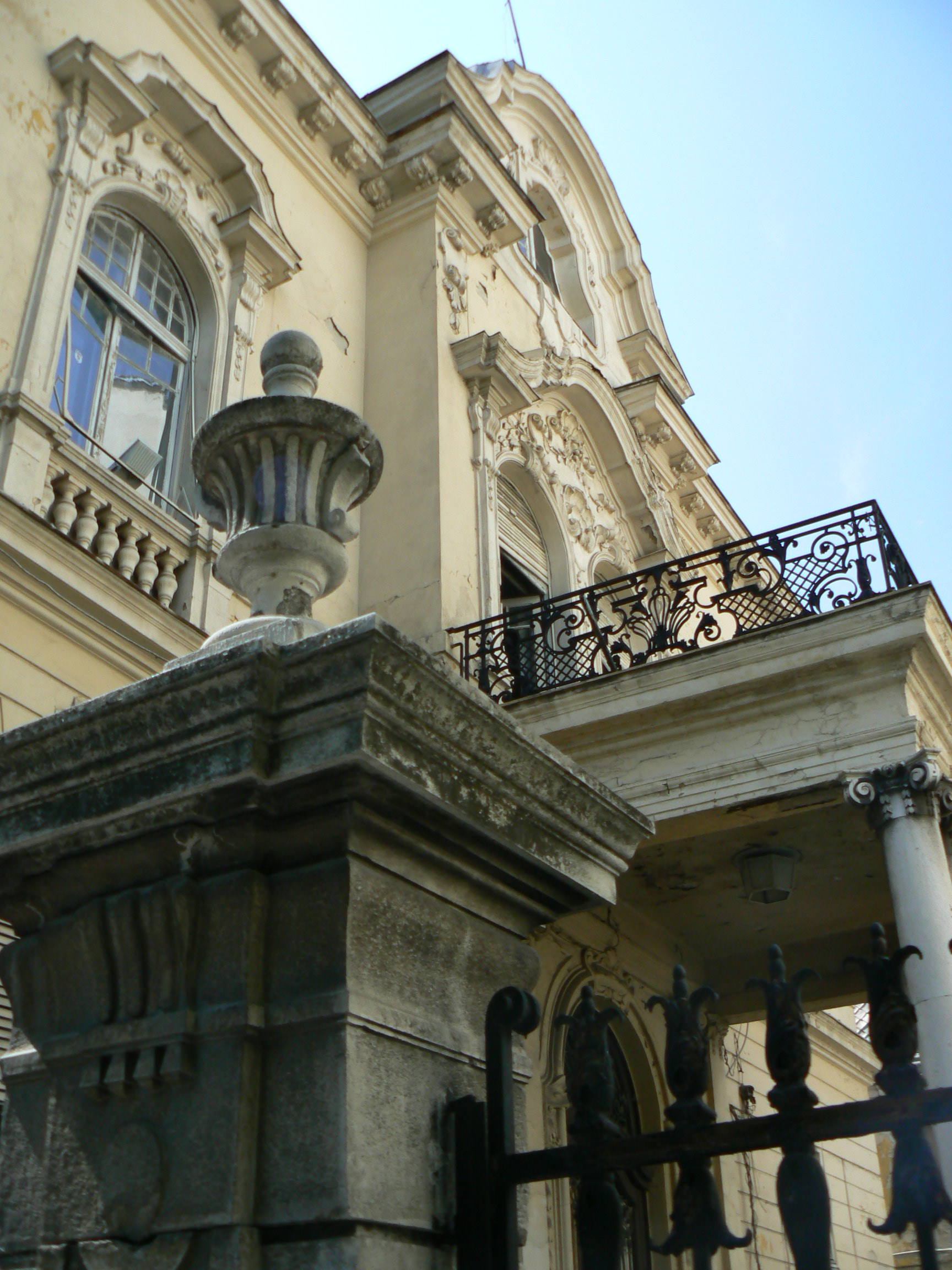
The wrought iron railings of the balcony above the veranda

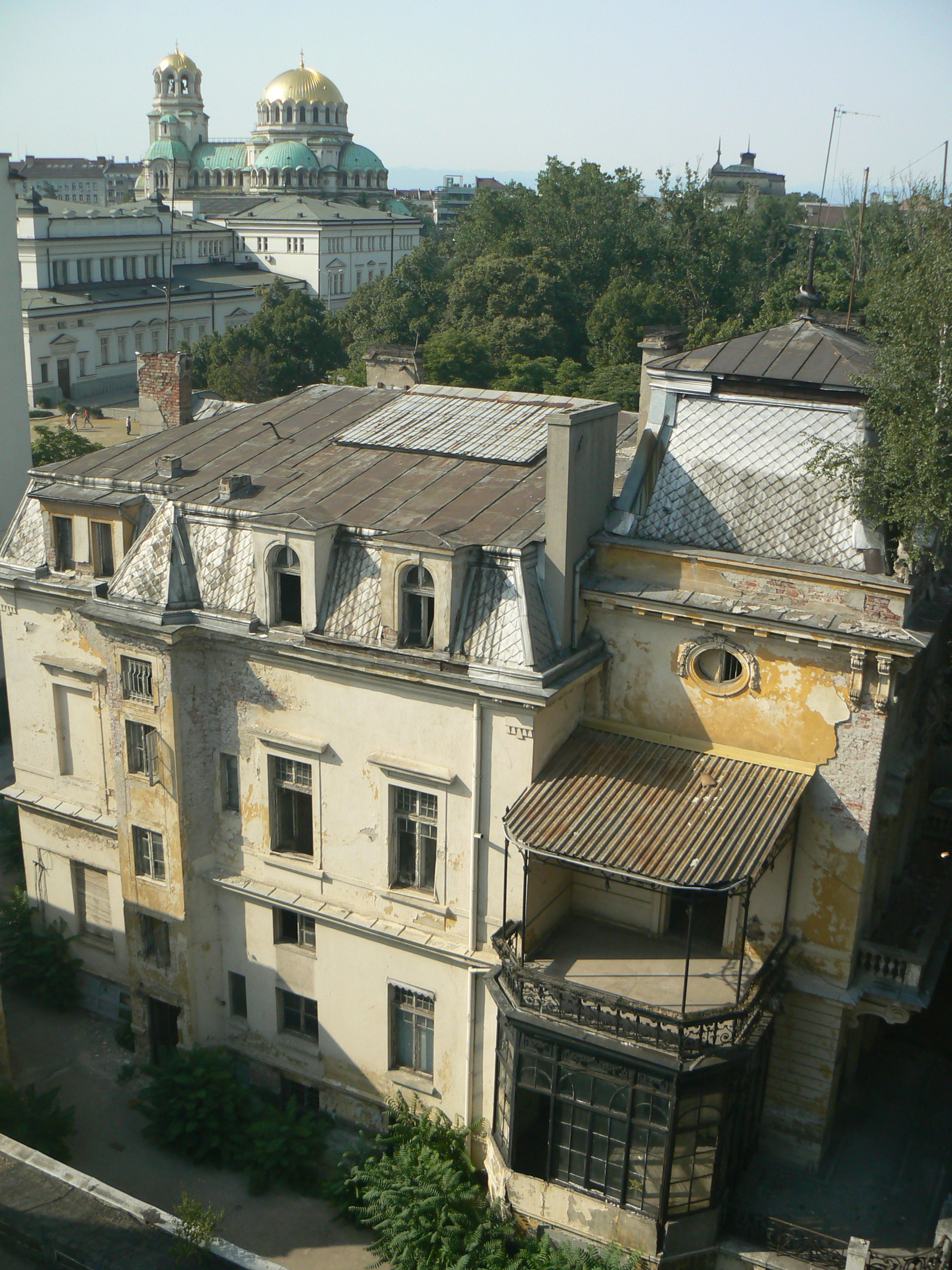
View towards the house's backyard

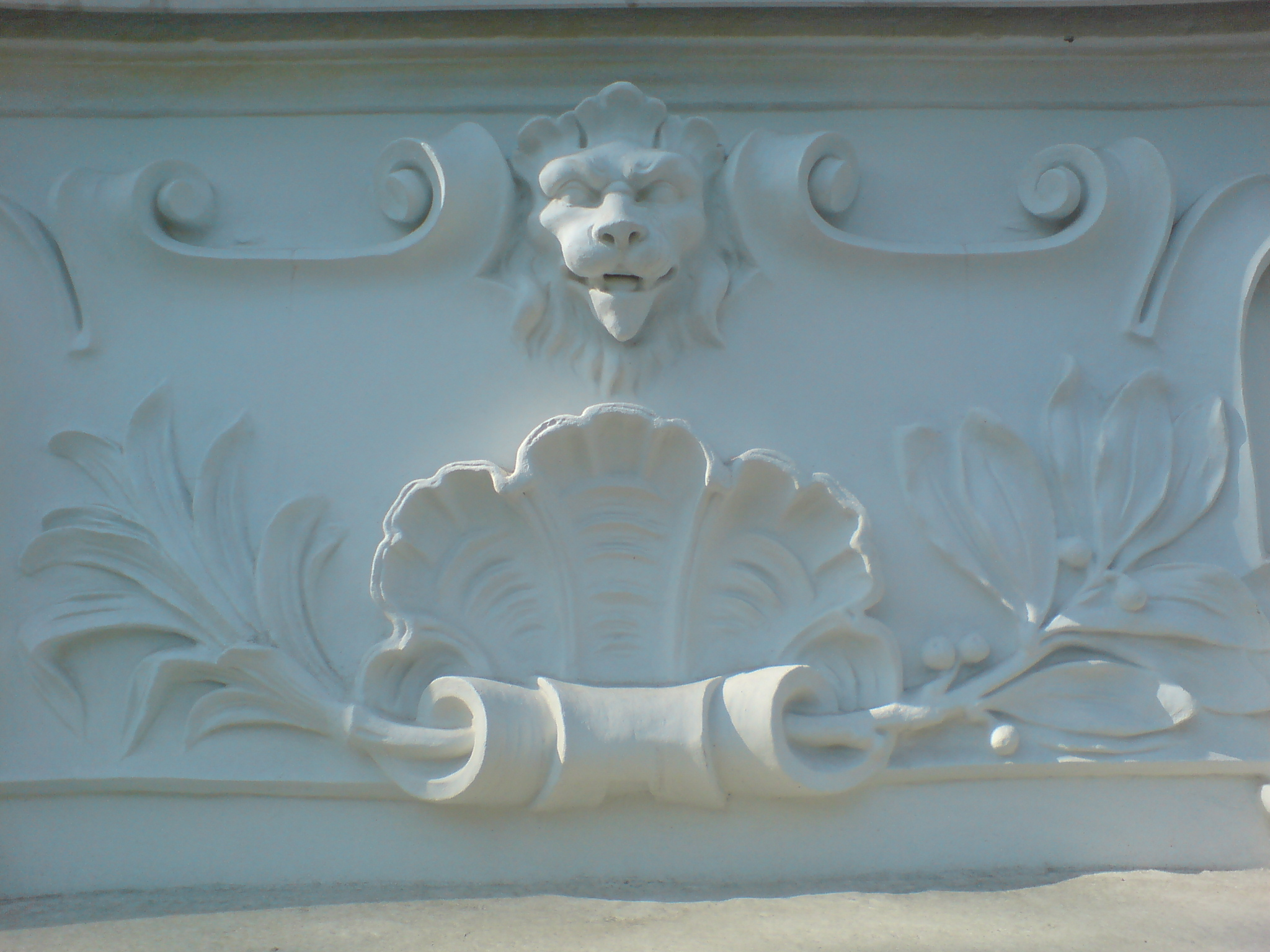
Fragment under the windows of the street facade

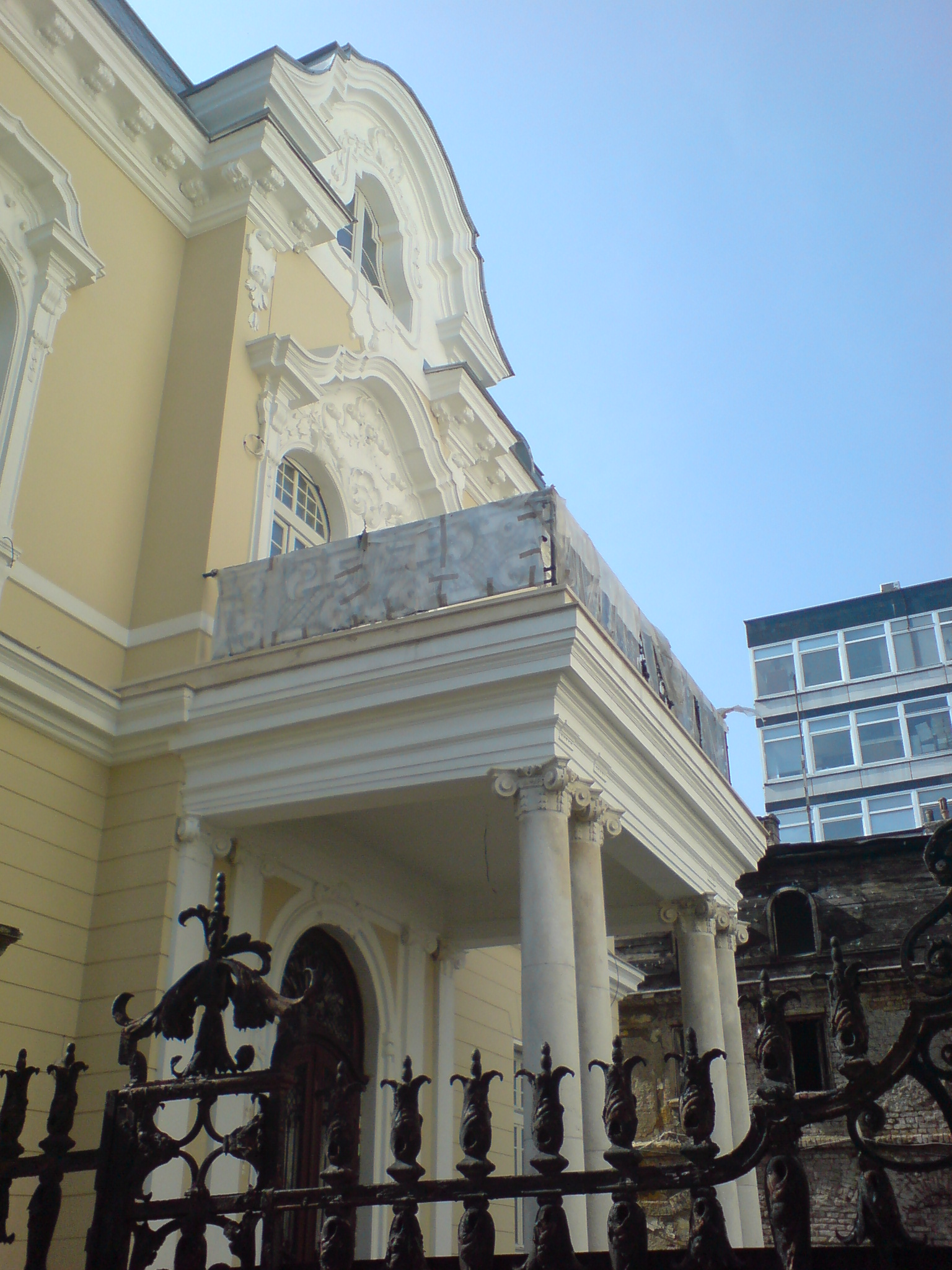
The veranda under renovation in April 2010

== See also ==
- Sarmadzhiev House
