= Boris Georgiev City Art Gallery =

Coordinates: 43°12′25″N 27°55′10″E

The Boris Georgiev City Art GalleryBulgarian: Градска художествена галерия „Борис Георгиев“, Gradska hudozhestvena galeria „Boris Georgiev“) is the municipal art gallery of Varna, Bulgaria.

The gallery has occupied its present building at 1 Lyuben Karavelov Street since 1944. It was named the Boris Georgiev City Art Gallery in 1999, in honour of Varna-born artist Boris Georgiev Boris Georgiev (1888–1962).

The edifice of the Boris Georgiev City Art Gallery was opened in September 1885 as the building of the Varna Men's High School. Designed in the Gothic Revival style, the building draws inspiration from medieval Northern European Brick Gothic. According to some researchers, Bulgarian National Revival master architect Gencho Kanev played an important part in the design of the edifice. Between 1912 and 1928, the building of the Varna Men's High School was used as a hospital, only to resume its operation as a school after 1928. A general meeting of Varna artists decided on 12 January 1944 to make the building the home of the Varna City Art Gallery. The north wing of the building was demolished in 1952 to make way for the Nakhimov Navy School, the modern Saints Cyril and Methodius School. Under architects Goranov and Kamenov in 1982–1987, the building was reorganized to better serve the purpose of a gallery.

The Boris Georgiev City Art Gallery owns a significant collection of Bulgarian art from the early 20th century onwards, and most notably the largest collection of works by gallery patron Boris Georgiev. Other Bulgarian artists represented in the gallery's permanent exhibition are Vladimir Dimitrov, Ivan Milev, Sirak Skitnik, Zlatyu Boyadzhiev, Tsanko Lavrenov, Nayden Petkov, David Peretz, Svetlin Rusev, Daria Vassilaynska. Displayed on the second floor are examples of portrait art from the Dutch Golden Age. The gallery's third floor regularly accommodates concerts, plays and readings. In total, the gallery has an area of 1,000 square metres (11,000 sq ft) spread over eight exhibition halls.
