= Friedrich Grünanger =

Austrian architect

- Born: Friedrich Grünanger; 25 January 1856; Segesvár, Transylvania, Habsburg Empire (today Sighișoara, Romania)
- Died: 14 December 1929; Salzburg, Austria
- Education: Academy of Fine Arts Vienna, Vienna
- Occupation: Architect
- Practice: Friedrich von Schmidt

Friedrich Grünanger (25 January 1856 – 14 December 1929) was a Transylvanian Austrian architect who worked primarily in Bulgaria.

Born in Schäßburg in Austria-Hungary (today Sighişoara in Romania), Grünanger studied at the Academy of Fine Arts Vienna architecture school between 1877 and 1879, under Friedrich von Schmidt. As a style, he was a representative of the late historism, of the eclectic style, the Viennese Neo-Baroque and the Vienna Secession.

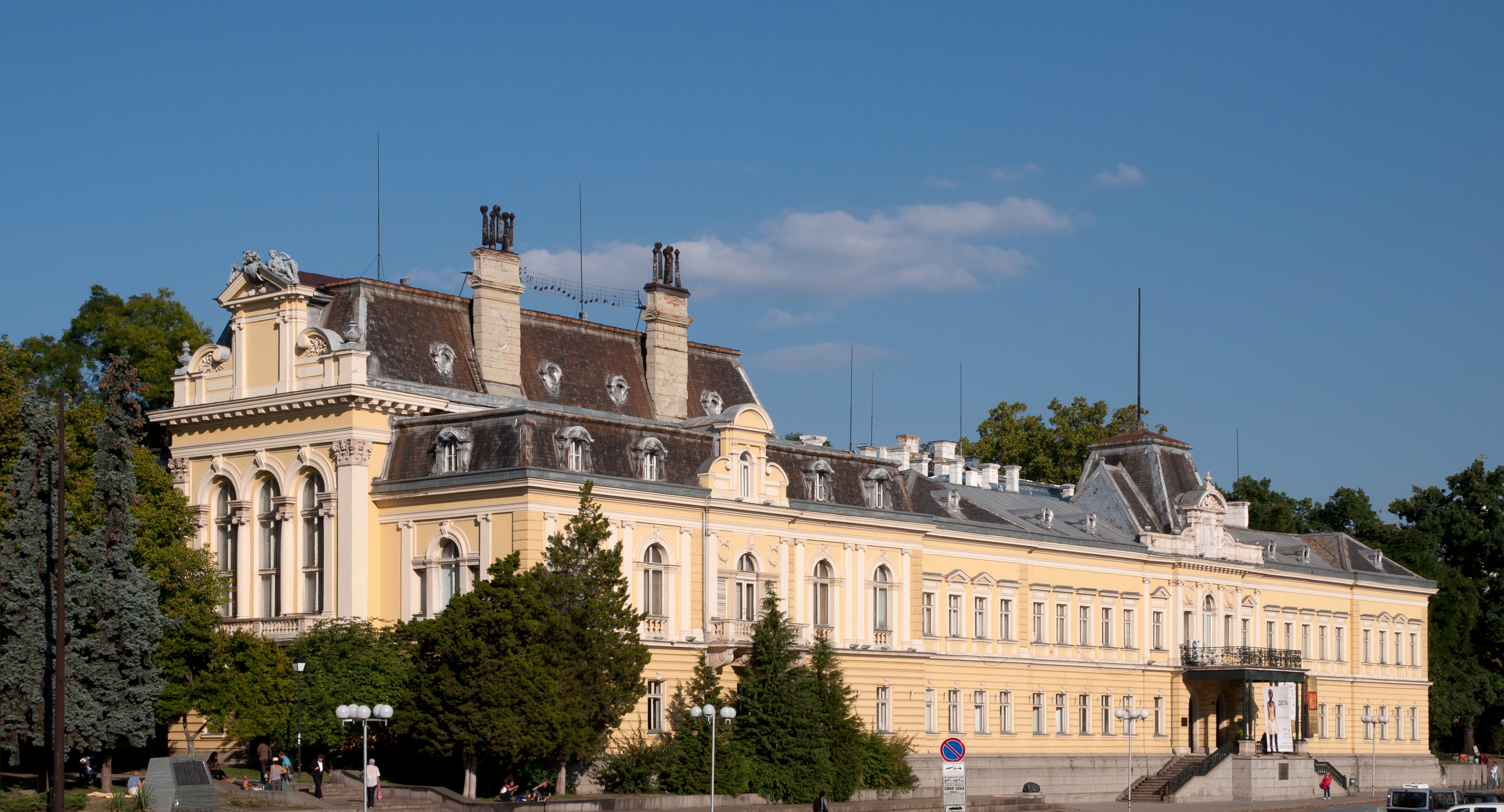
The former royal palace in Sofia

In 1879, he was appointed in the Direction of Public Buildings, part of the Bulgarian Ministry of Internal Affairs, and became Chief Architect of Razgrad, later court architect of Knyaz Alexander of Bulgaria and his successor Ferdinand. During his thirty years of work in Bulgaria, he designed and constructed numerous remarkable public and residential buildings, mainly in Sofia. In 1908 he returned to Austria-Hungary and retired in Salzburg, but briefly returned to Bulgaria between 1911 and 1914 until his work in the country was discontinued after World War I.

== Works ==
This is an incomplete list of selected works by Friedrich Grünanger.

- Razgrad
  - Mausoleum of the Russian Warriors (1879–1880)
  - Razgrad High School, today Exarch Joseph High School of Foreign Languages
- Rousse
  - regional government building and palace of Knyaz Alexander (co-work), today the Rousse Regional History Museum (1879–1882); first governmental building in Bulgaria built for the purpose after the Liberation in 1878
  - first navy watchtower and meteorological station in Bulgaria (1883)
- Sofia
  - Royal Palace of Bulgaria (today housing the National Art Gallery and the National Ethnographic Museum) (1880–1882). In 1893/4–1895 built the three-storey east wing and shaped the palace's current appearance
  - two-storey private house with a mansard for Anna Pulieva (1899)
  - Sarmadzhiev House: private house for Haralambi Sarmadzhiev (today Turkish ambassadorial residence)
  - Sofia Spiritual Academy (today Sofia University Faculty of Theology); co-work with other architects
  - Sofia Seminary with the St John of Rila Church (1902–1914)
  - Sofia Synagogue (1904–1909)
  - Sofia Mineral Baths (1904); preliminary design with arch. Petko Momchilov
  - Defence and Staff College park (1906)
  - Yablanski House: private house for Dimitar Yablanski (1907) (until 1993 Chinese Embassy, now a luxury club-restaurant)
- Varna
  - the male high school
- Kyustendil
  - Teachers' Institute (today town hall)

== Gallery ==
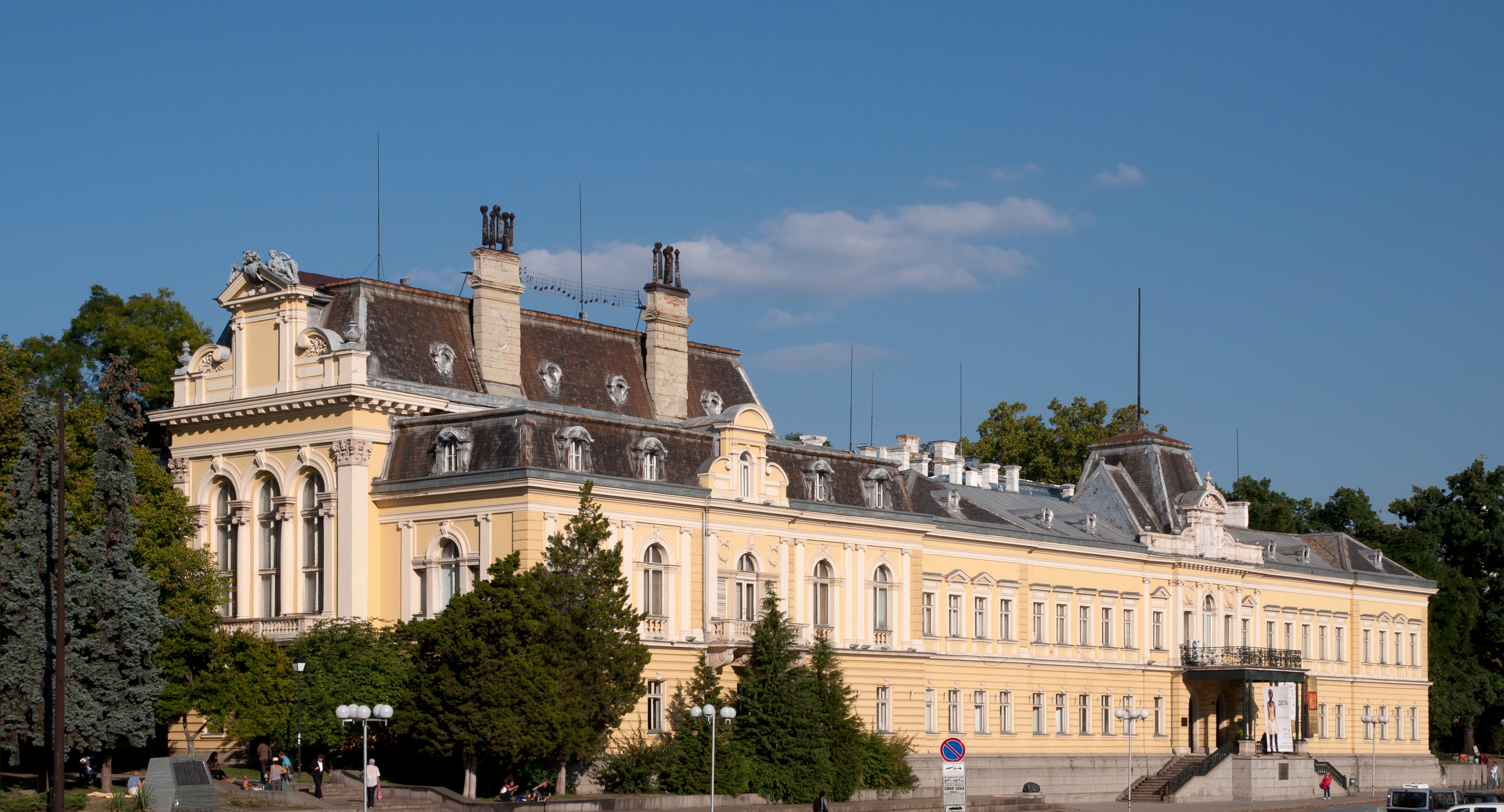
The Royal Palace in Sofia

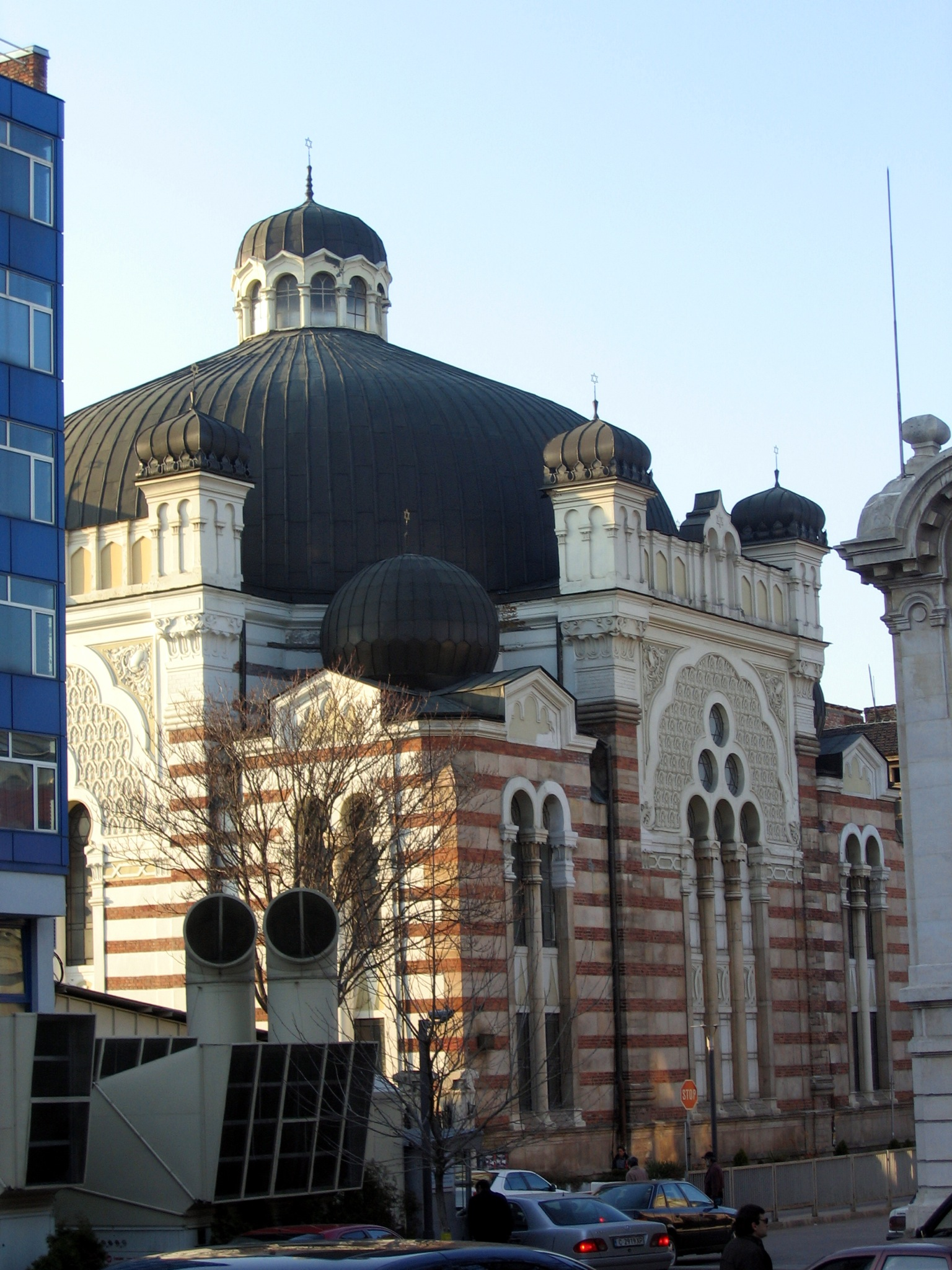
The Sofia Synagogue, built in Moorish Revival style

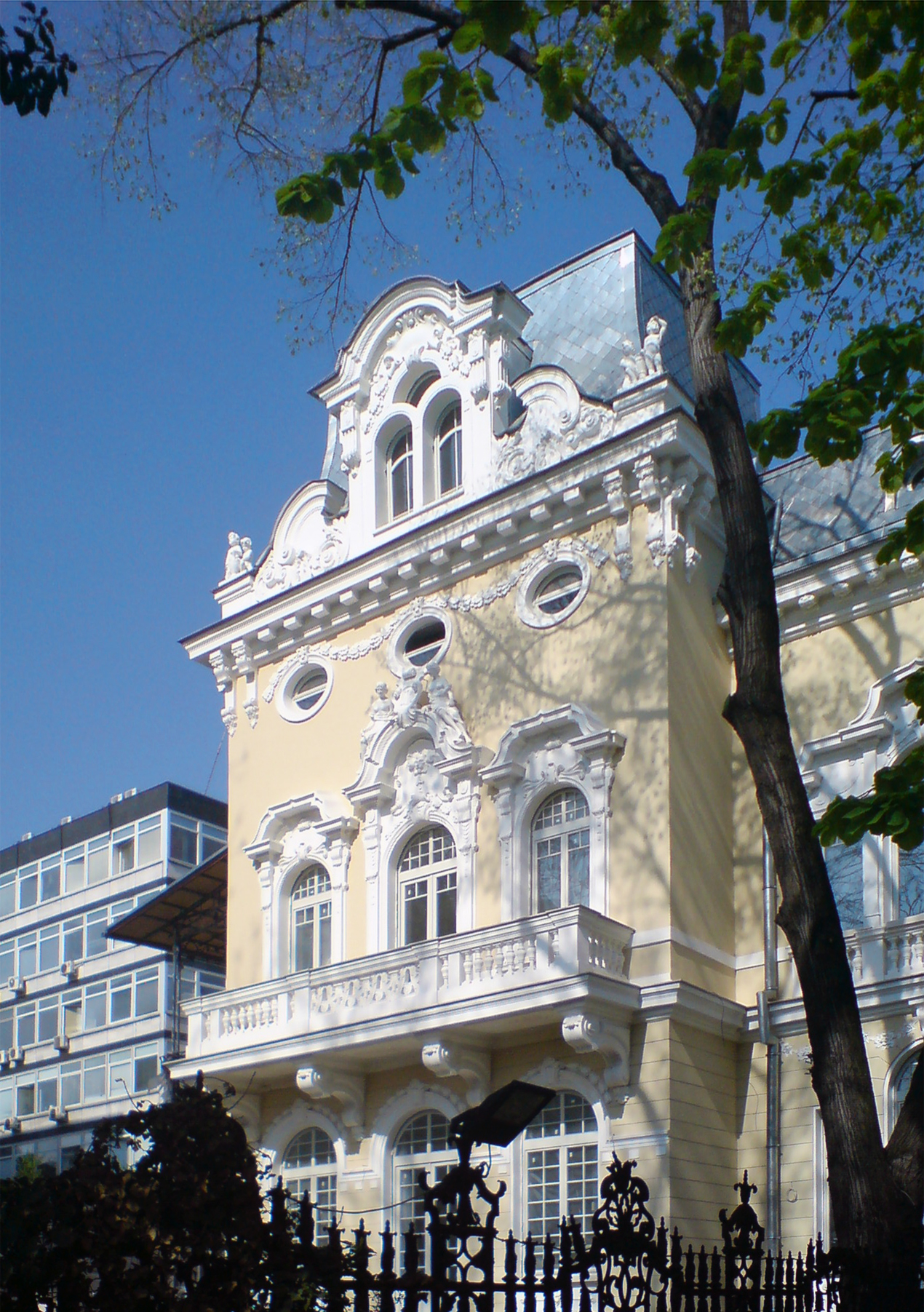
The Yablanski House

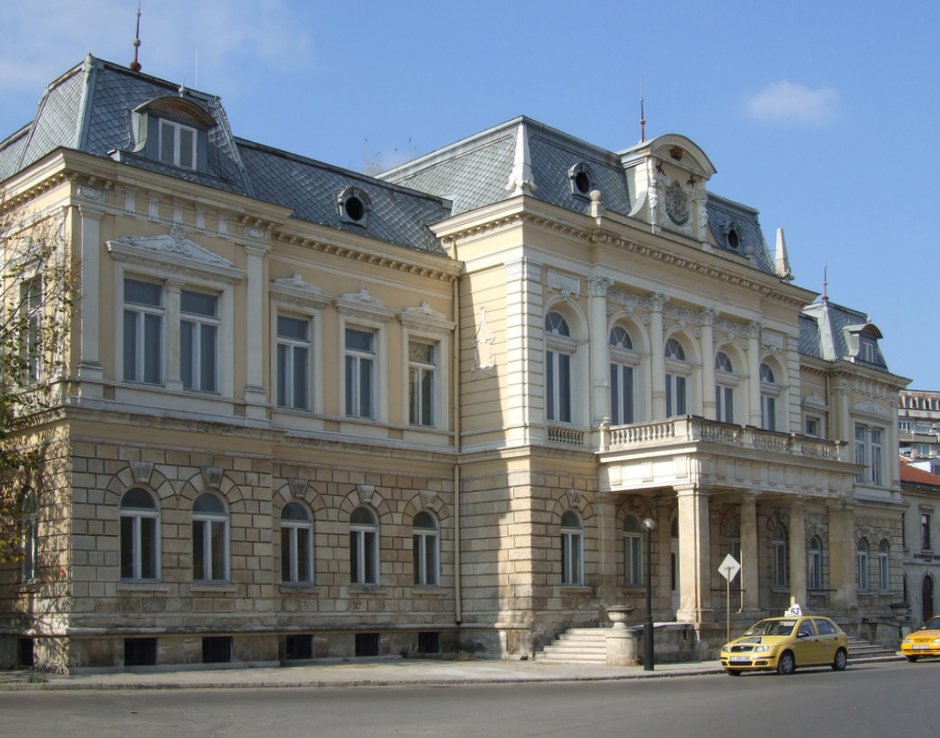
The Battenberg Palace in Rousse

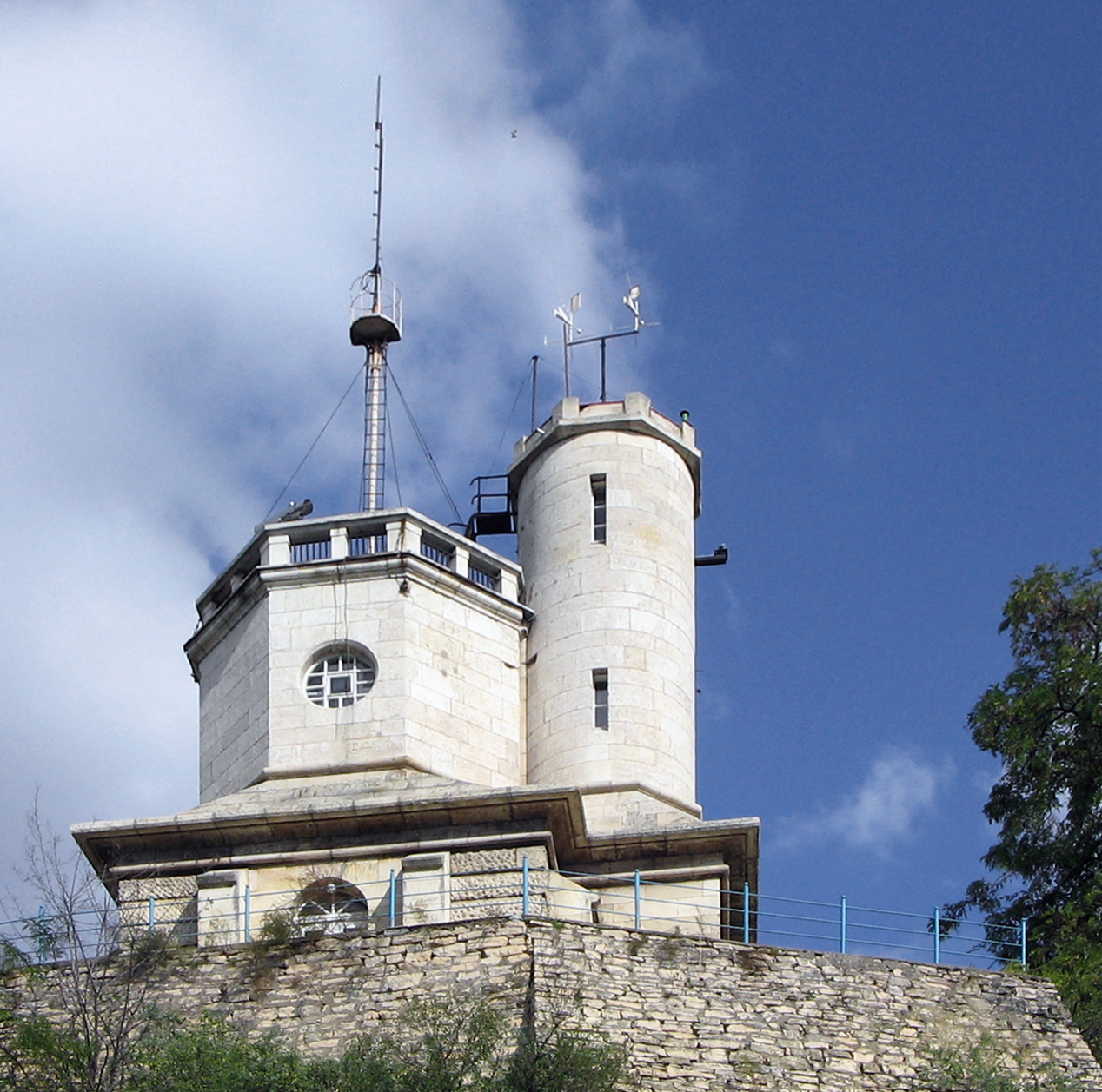
A weather station in Russe

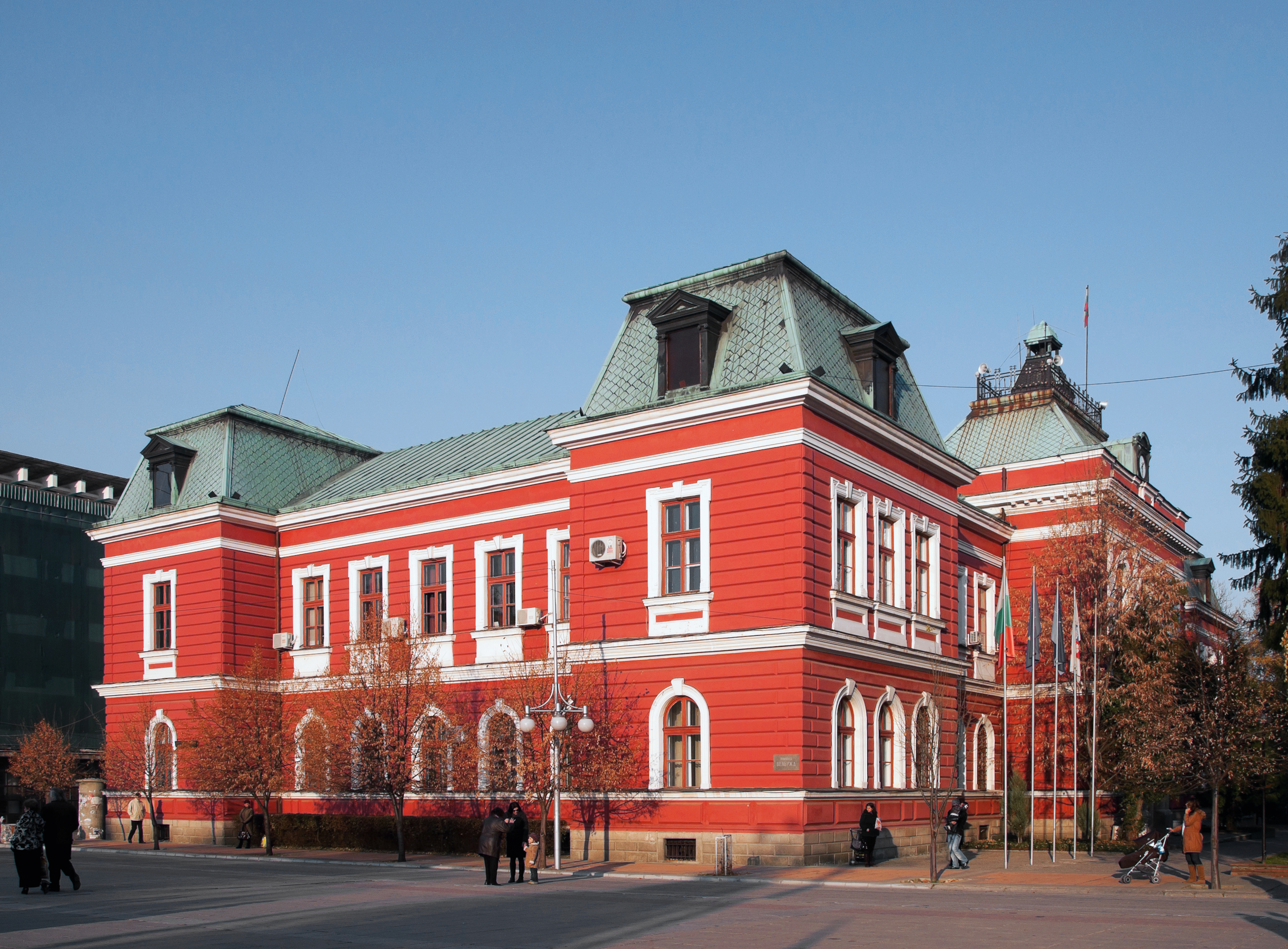
Kyustendil town hall

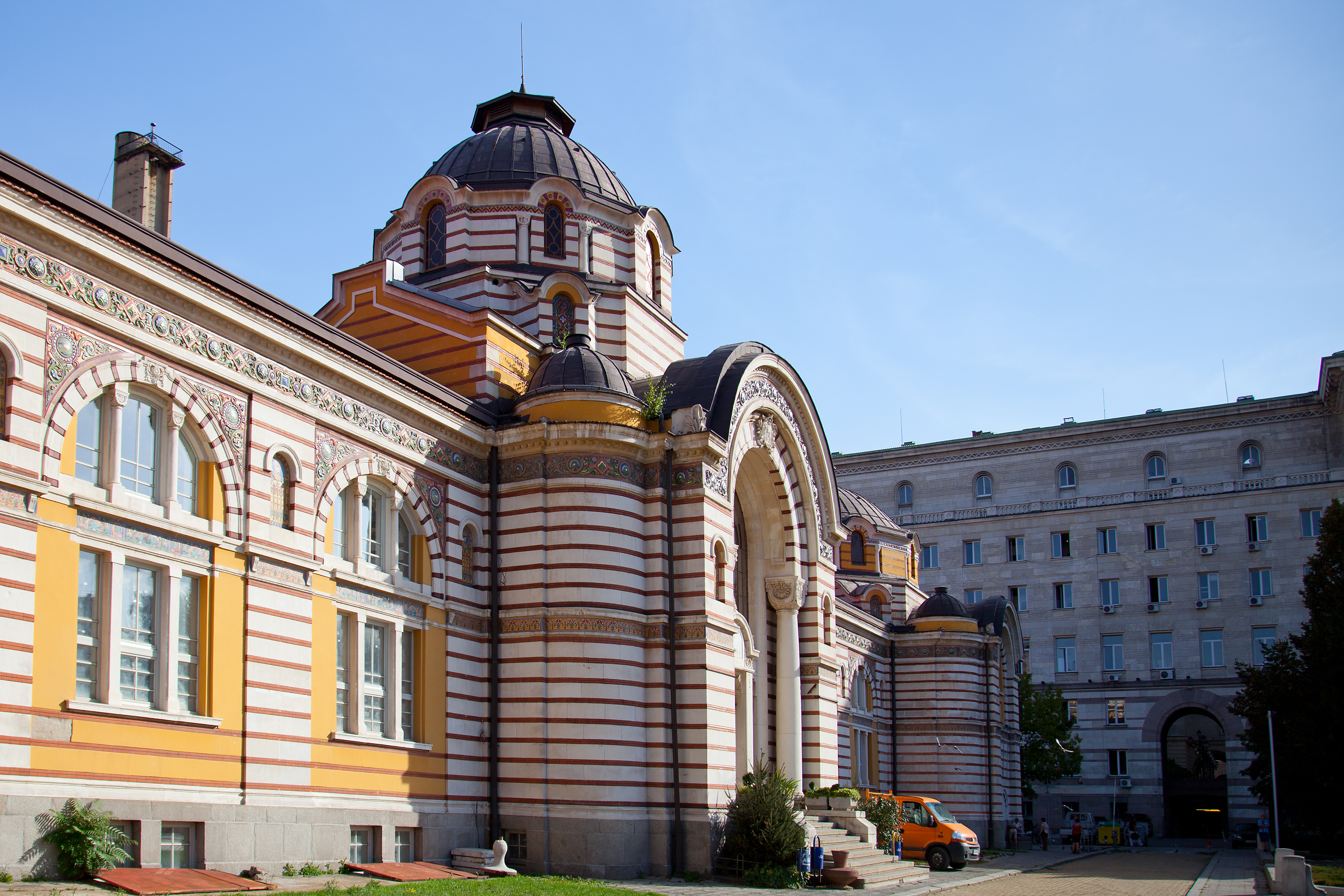
Sofia Public Mineral Baths - now Sofia Regional Historical Museum
