= Rousse Regional Historical Museum =

Regional museum of Bulgaria

Coordinates: 43°50′38.50″N 25°56′52″E

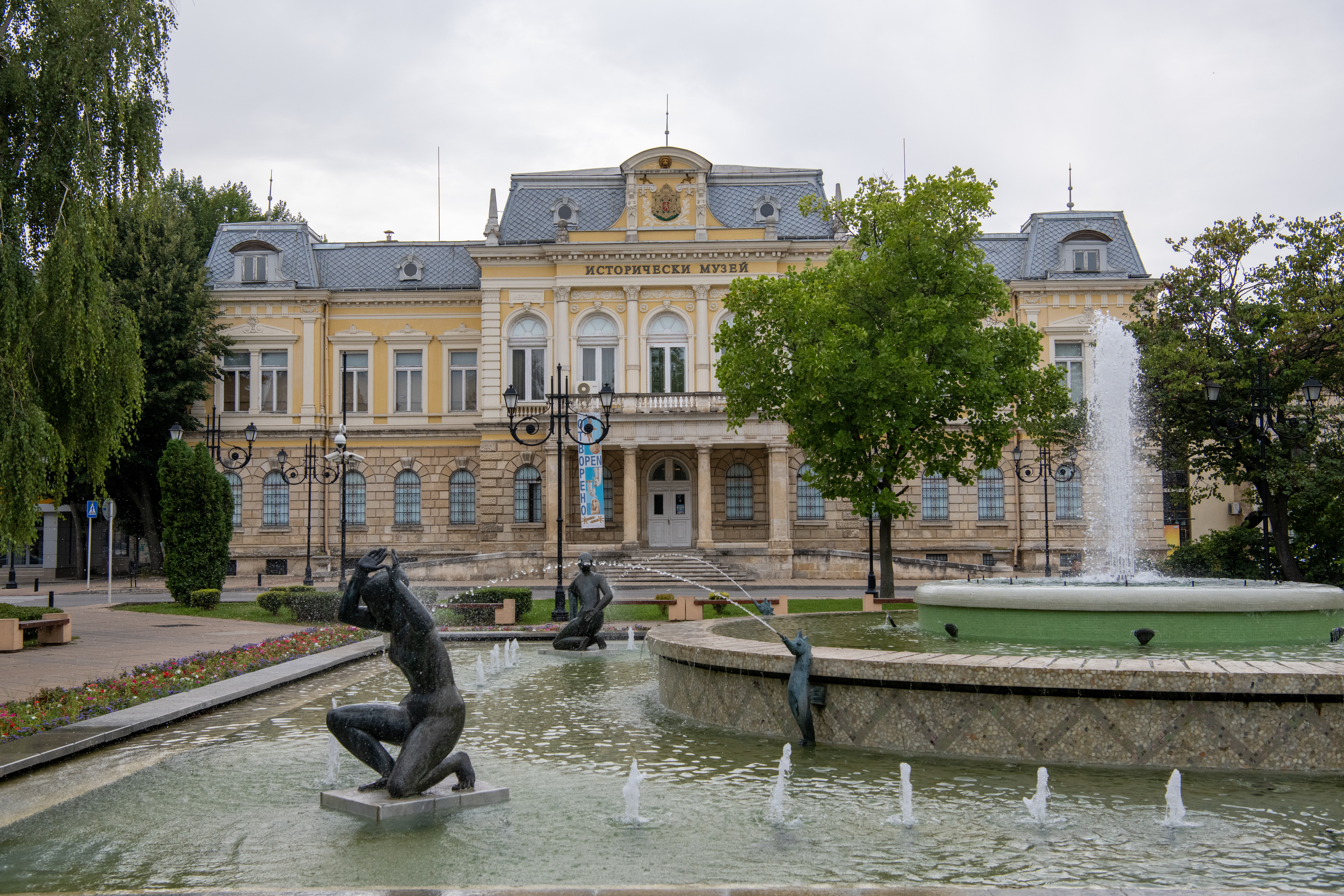
The Battenberg Palace which hosts the museum

The Rousse Regional Historical Museum is one of the 11 regional museums of Bulgaria. It acts within the Rousse, Razgrad, and Silistra regions. The museum occupies the building of the former Battenberg Palace, previously a local court, built 1879–1882 by Friedrich Grünanger.

The Rousse Regional Historical Museum was established in 1904. Its basis are the archeological collections of Karel and Hermenguild Shkorpil, as well as of the naturalist Vasil Kovachev, which were gathered in the "Knyaz Boris" men's high school of Rousse.

== Collection ==
The museum holds approximately 140,000 items, including:

- prehistoric pottery and idol plastic arts
- the Borovo Treasure of the 4th century BC (a ritual wine set, gold-plated silver)
- the finds of excavations of the antique Danube castles Yatrus and Sexaginta Prista, and of the medieval Bulgarian city Cherven
- a collection of medieval frescoes
- a collection of exhibits of traditional lifestyle
- a collection of urban clothing, china, glass, and silver from the end of the 19th — beginning of the 20th century
- personal belongings of notable figures from the struggle for national liberation
- a numismatic collection
- a collection of bones from prehistoric mammals, including a unique lower jaw of a Mammuthus rumanus
- a bronze helmet from 4th–3rd century BC, which it is suggested may have belonged to one of the soldiers of Alexander the Great. The helmet was contributed in August 2006 by the Bobokovi brothers, major shareholders of the Prista Oil company. The time and place where the helmet was found was not publicly revealed.

Along with its central site, it runs six others, mostly in the city of Rousse:

- the Pantheon of National Revival Heroes
- the Museum of Urban Life
- the Zahari Stoyanov House Museum
- the Toma Kardzhiev House Museum
- Sexaginta Prista Roman Fort, 0.45 km south of the Historical Museum
- the Rock-hewn Churches of Ivanovo 23km south of the Historical Museum
- the Medieval Town of Cherven 36km south of the Historical Museum

== Gallery ==
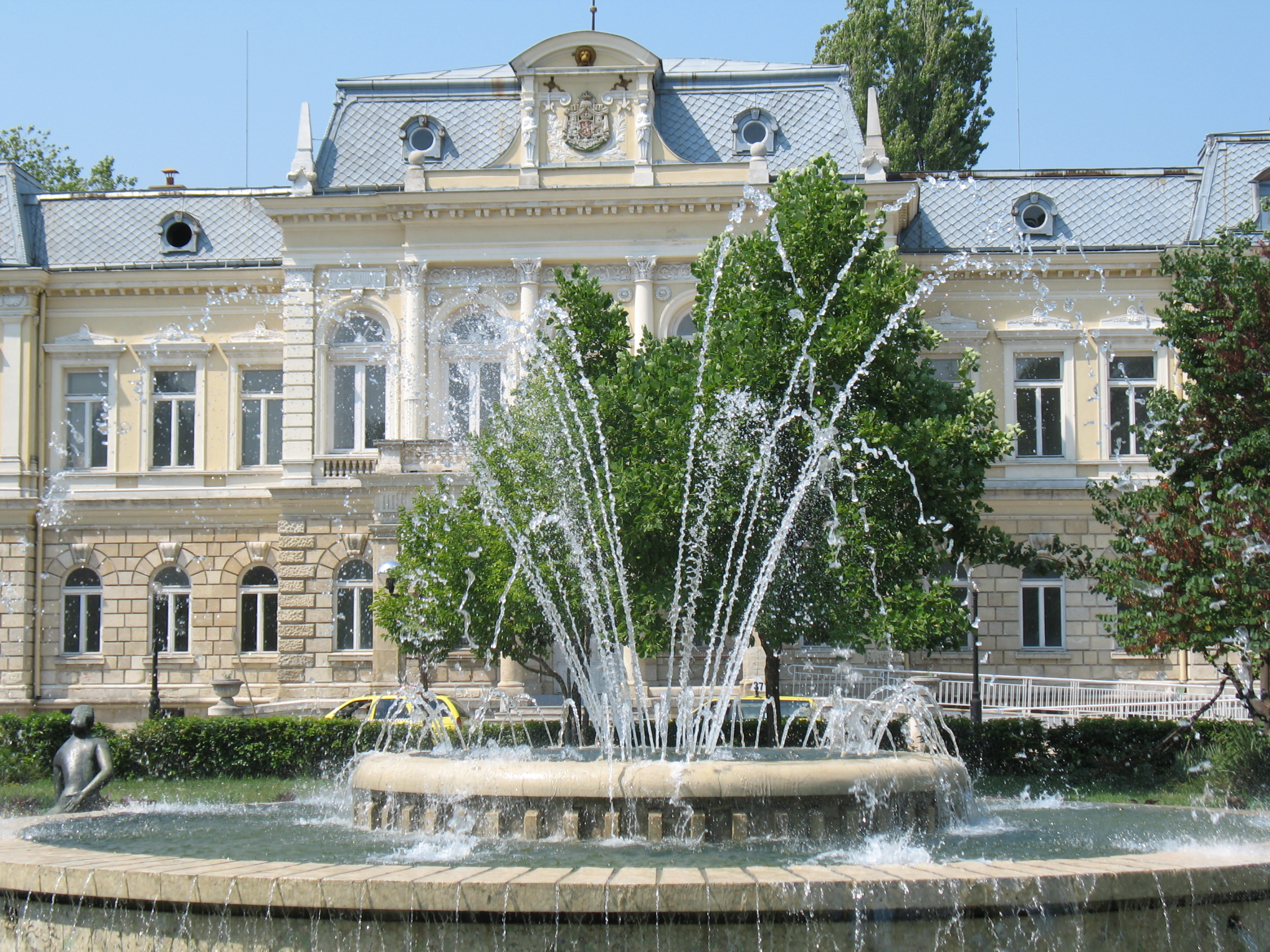
Front view

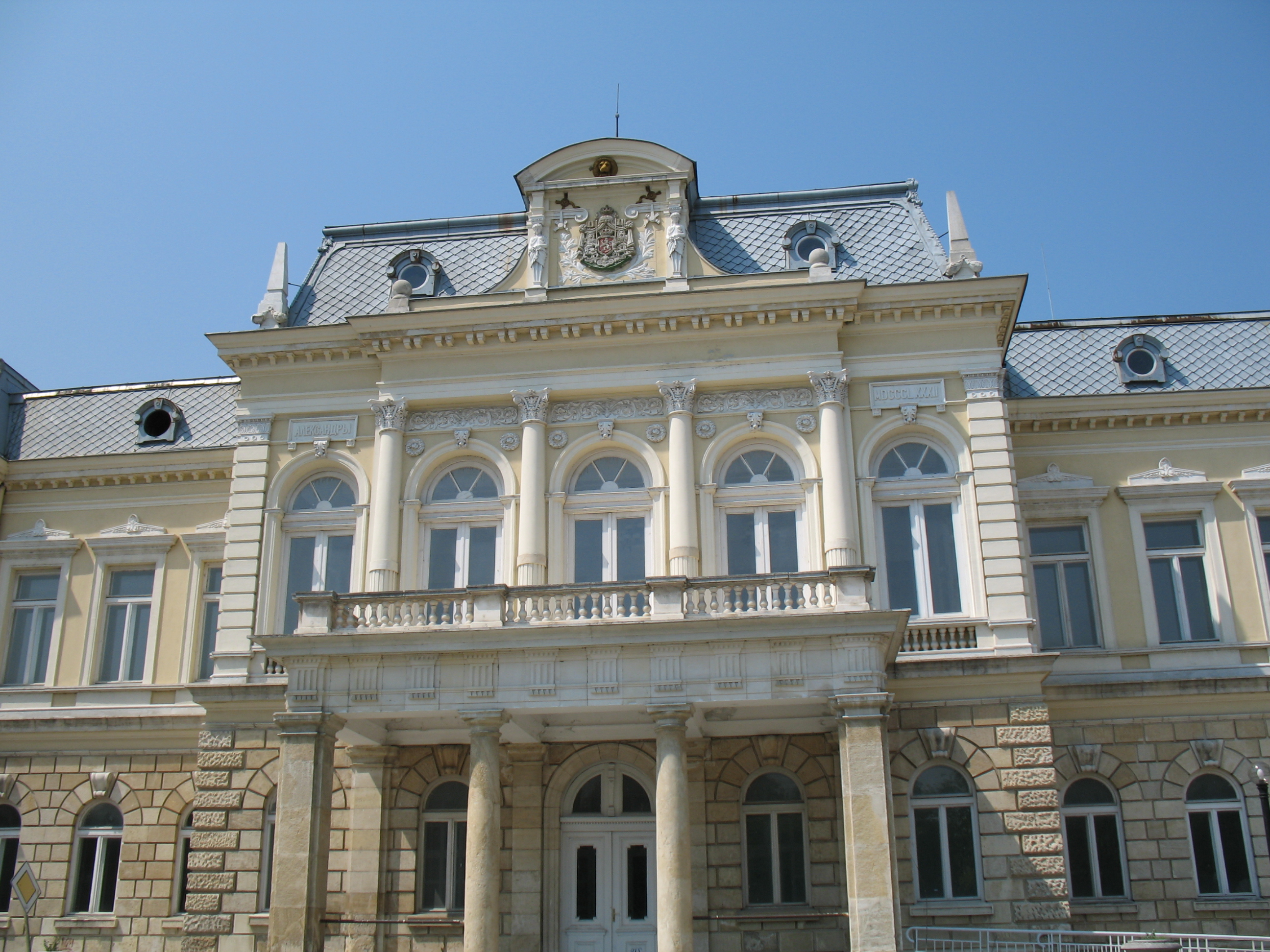
Front view

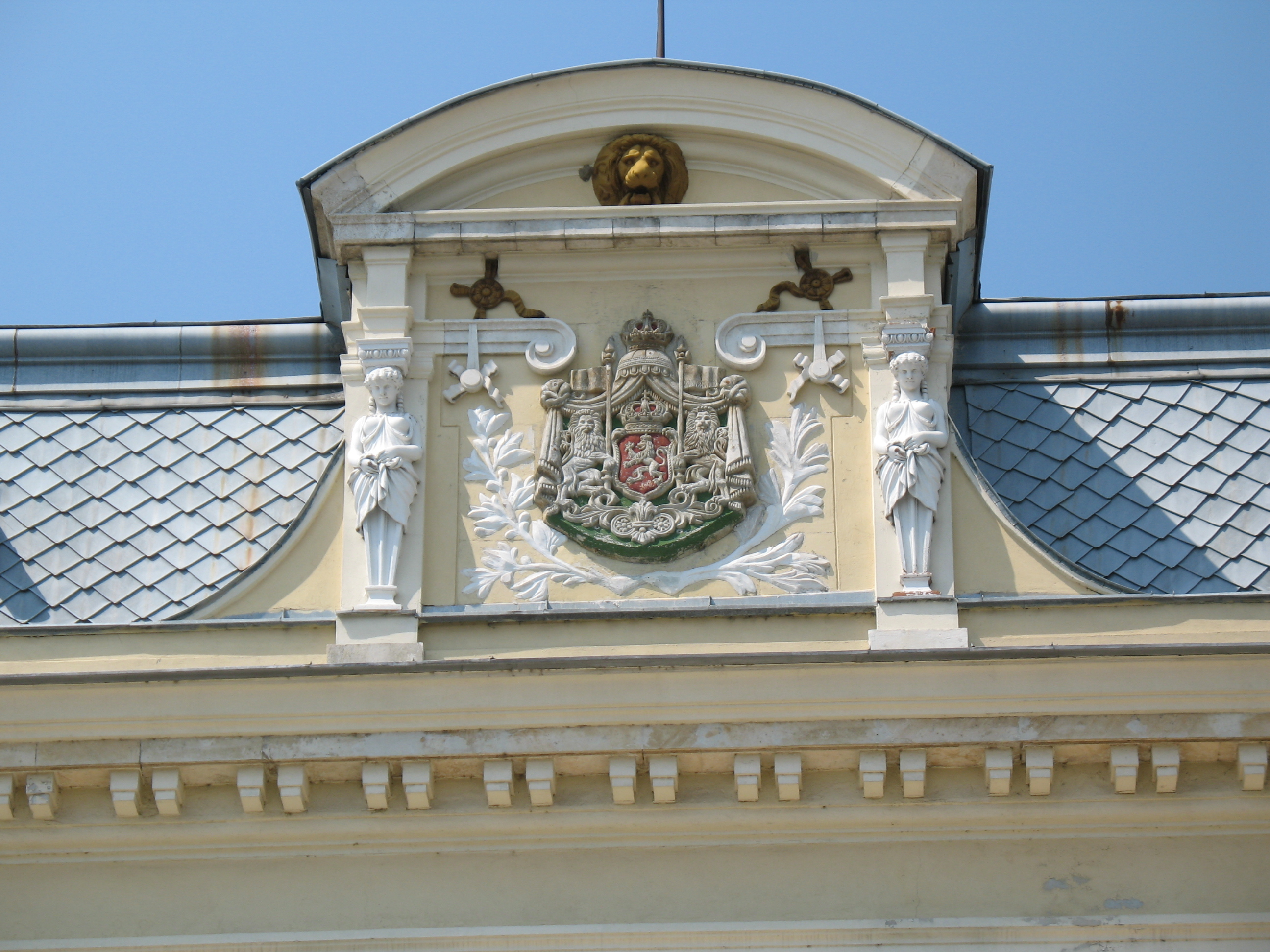
A detail of the façade
