= Sarmadzhiev House =

- къща на Сърмаджиев (in Bulgarian)
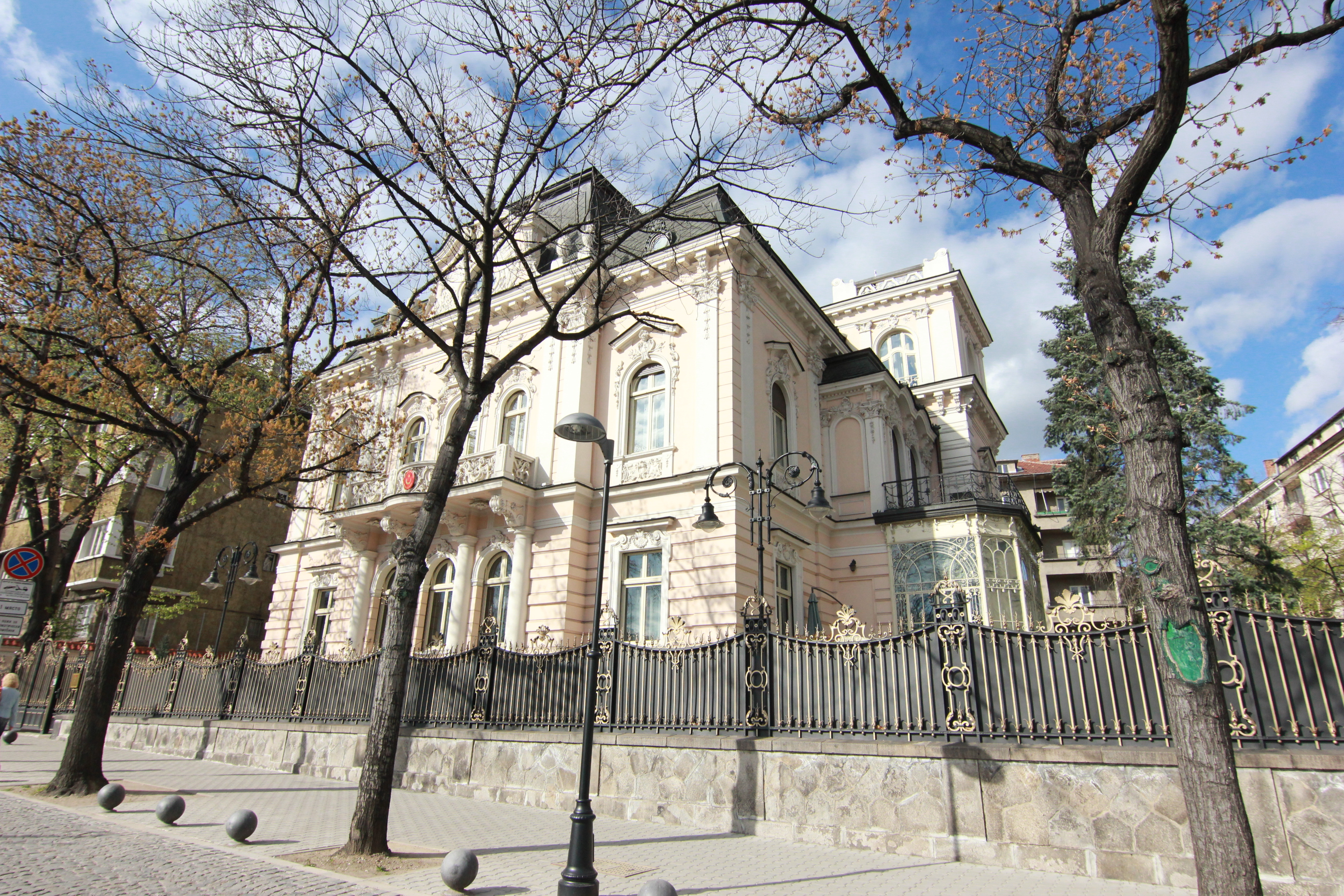
- Sarmadzhiev House, currently residence of the Turkish ambassador in Sofia
- Interactive map of the Sarmadzhiev House area

General information
- Type: house
- Architectural style: Neo-Baroque
- Location: Sofia, Bulgaria
- Coordinates: 42°41′32.4″N 23°20′09.3″E
- Construction started: 1902
- Completed: 1903

Technical details
- Floor count: 2

Design and construction
- Architect: Friedrich Grünanger

The Sarmadzhiev House (Bulgarian: къща на Сърмаджиев, kashta na Sarmadzhiev) is a Neo-Baroque house in central Sofia, the capital of Bulgaria. The Sarmadzhiev House lies on the corner of Tsar Osvoboditel Boulevard and Krakra Street, between the Sofia University rectorate and Eagles' Bridge. The house was designed by Austrian–Bulgarian architect Friedrich Grünanger and built in 1903 for lawyer and diplomat Haralampi Sarmadzhiev. Since 1916, it has been owned by the Ottoman Empire and its successor, the Republic of Turkey. Currently, it serves as the residence of the Turkish ambassador to Bulgaria.

== History ==
Dr. Haralampi (or Haralambi) Sarmadzhiev was a Bessarabian Bulgarian born in Bolhrad, then in the Russian Empire, in 1860. After studying and practicing law in Bucharest and graduating from the Sorbonne in Paris, Sarmadzhiev settled in the Principality of Bulgaria in 1891 and married Elena, with whom he had four sons and a daughter. Sarmadzhiev served as a legal advisor and general secretary of the Ministry of Foreign Affairs and subsequently as a diplomat in Belgrade and Vienna between 1895 and 1902. In 1902, he returned to Bulgaria to start his own private legal practice and commissioned the house to Friedrich Grünanger. Grünanger was at the time a leading architect in Bulgaria, having worked on the Royal Palace in Sofia and other prominent assignments.

Sarmadzhiev died in 1908, leaving the house behind to his family. However, financial and personal difficulties forced his widow Elena to rent the house to the Ottoman Empire in 1914. Two years later, in 1916, the Ottomans acquired the property. It was used initially as an embassy and subsequently as an ambassador's residence by the Ottoman Empire and its successor state Turkey.

During some of his time as Ottoman military attaché in Sofia in 1913–15, the future founder of secular and republican Turkey and first Turkish president Mustafa Kemal Atatürk worked in the Sarmadzhiev House. His office has been preserved to this day and has been refurbished as a small museum of Atatürk, though not accessible to the public.

Ten years after designing the Sarmadzhiev House, Friedrich Grünanger had a house built for himself in Salzburg that is nearly identical in design. It is known as Villa Hedwig or the Grünanger Villa.

Since 1998, the Sarmadzhiev House has been under protection as a cultural monument of national importance.

== Architecture ==
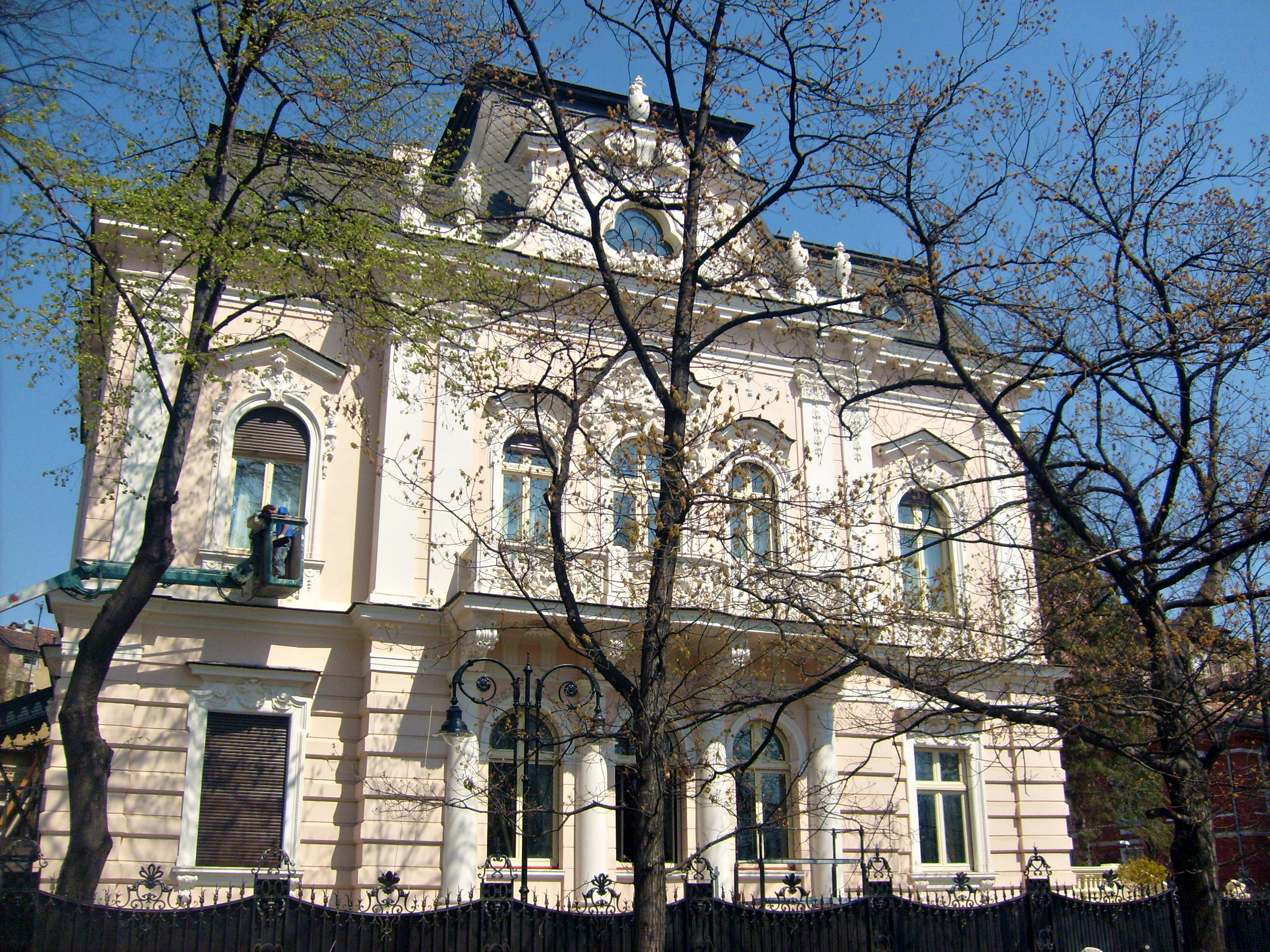
Front view of the Sarmadzhiev House

The Sarmadzhiev House is a two-story edifice designed in an elegant Viennese Imperial Baroque style. In addition to Baroque, the design features Vienna Secession, Rococo and Mediterranean Renaissance influences.

Some of the highlights of the house's architecture include the flat-roofed turret and the monumental and richly decorated facade. The tin-covered mansard roof has a wooden construction and the house's brick walls are supported by the original wooden beams. The jalousie windows also feature wooden frames.

A stained-glass antechamber leads from the yard to the interior of the house. The lobby, which includes a French fireplace and a bust of Atatürk, leads to the dining room and to the biggest of the three salons. The remaining rooms include a winter garden and Atatürk's former office.

Architecturally and historywise, the Sarmadzhiev House shares much with the slightly later Yablanski House (1907) on the opposite side of Tsar Osvoboditel Boulevard. Both were designed by Friedrich Grünanger in a similar style for eminent members of the Bulgarian elite and were later used as embassies.
