= Tsanko Lavrenov =

Tsanko Lavrenov Цанко Лавренов
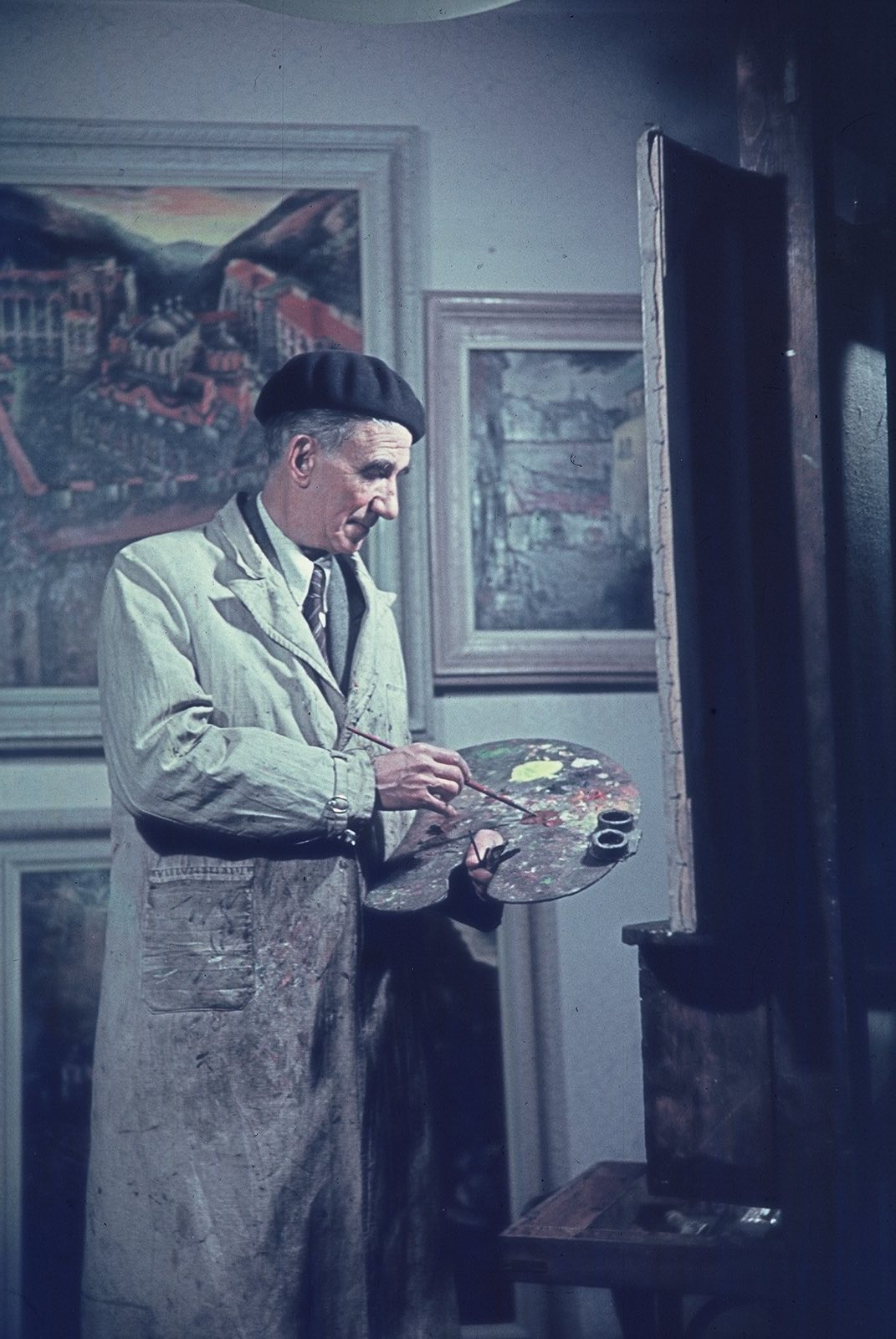
- Born: November 24, 1896; Plovdiv, Bulgaria
- Died: October 18, 1978 (aged 81); Sofia, Bulgaria
- Known for: Painter

Tsanko Lavrenov (Bulgarian: Цанко Лавренов) was a Bulgarian painter and art critic born in 1896, deceased in 1978.

He is one of the most prominent, influential and distinctive Bulgarian artists of the 20th century. A modernist influenced by the Symbolism and the Secession, Lavrenov is best known for his cityscapes of the old town of Plovdiv as well as his monasteries cycle.

== Biography and career ==
Tsanko Ivanov Lavrenov was born on November 24, 1896, in the city of Plovdiv, Bulgaria. His grandfather Lavrentiy was a bookman, copyist of catholic manuscripts. Lavrenov graduated at the French college in Plovdiv. In 1921-22, he enrolled at a private art school in Vienna.

== Selected works ==
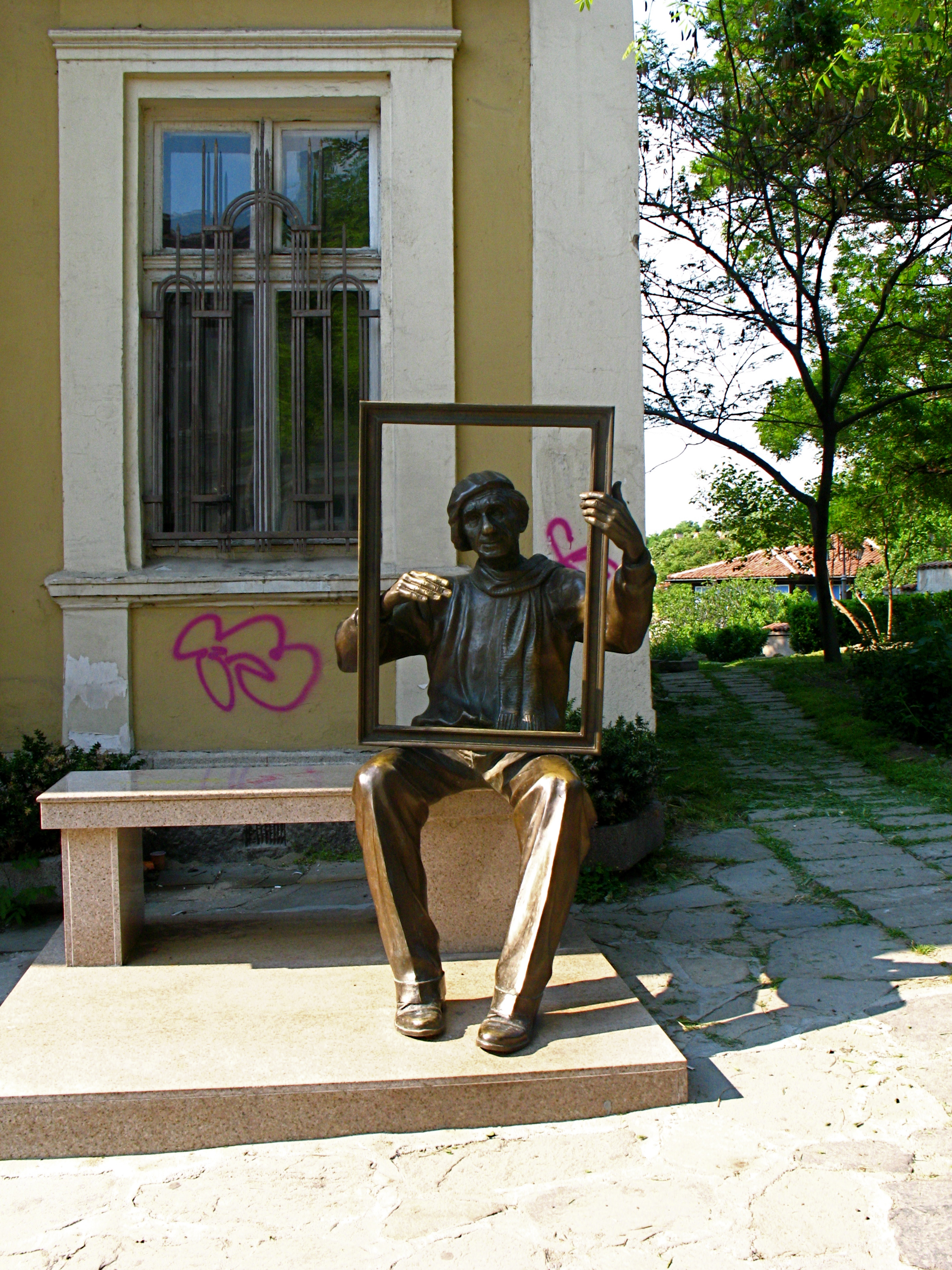
Sculpture of Lavrenov in Plovdiv

- The Old Plovdiv (1930)
- Transfiguration Monastery
- Kurshum han (1937)
- The Church of St Sophia in Ohrid (1942)
- Saint Pantaleon Church in Veles, Macedonia (1943)
- Still life with flowers of the field (1944)
- The Old Plovdiv - diptych (1946)
- The Old Plovdiv (1974–75)

=== Holy Mountain cycle ===
- Zograf Monastery (1936)
- The main gate of Vatopedi monastery (1941)
- General view of Helandariou monastery (1942)
- The port of Zograf Monastery (1958)
