= Sofia Theological Seminary =

Coordinates: 42°40′31″N 23°20′11″E

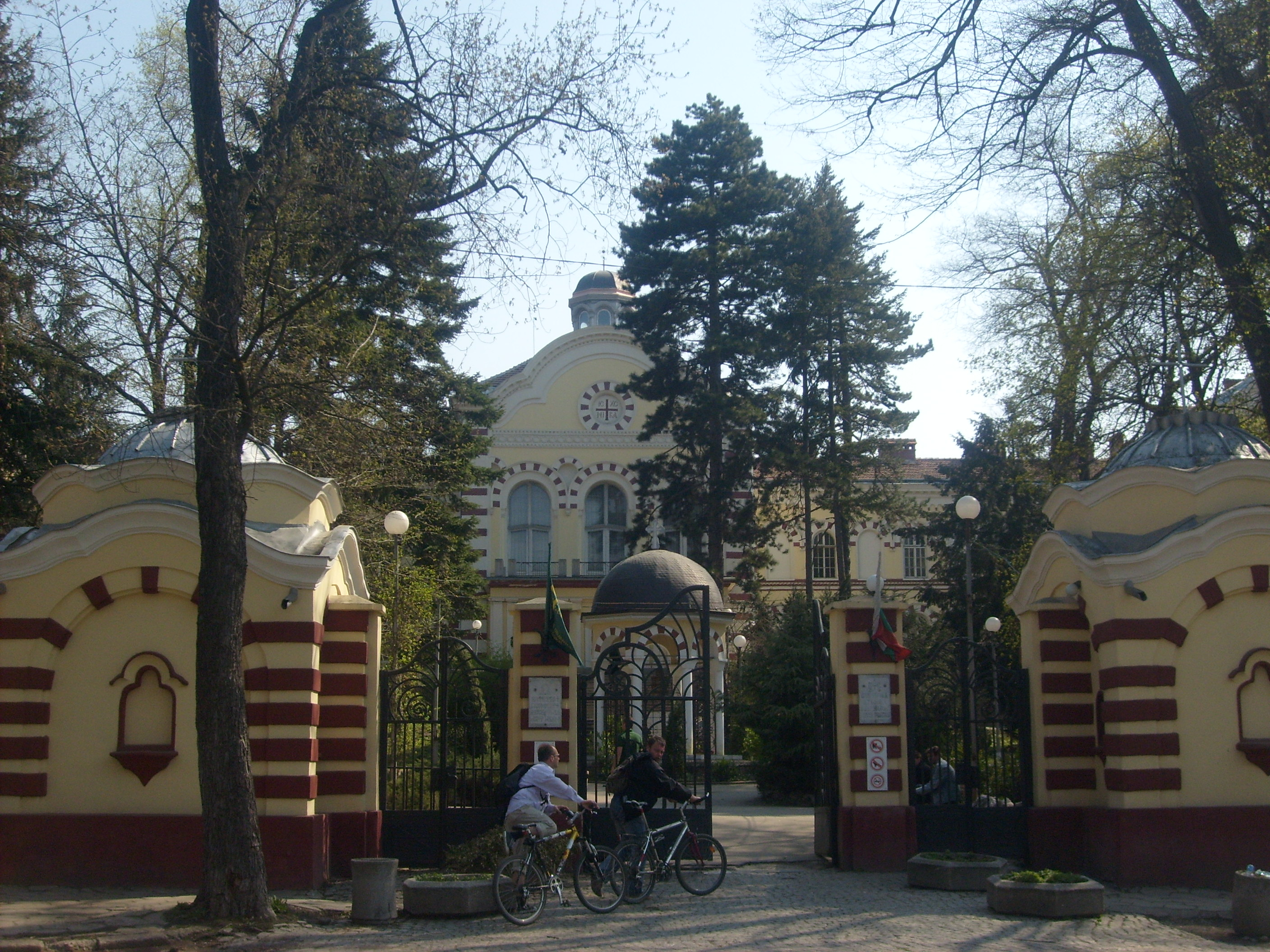
The Sofia Seminary

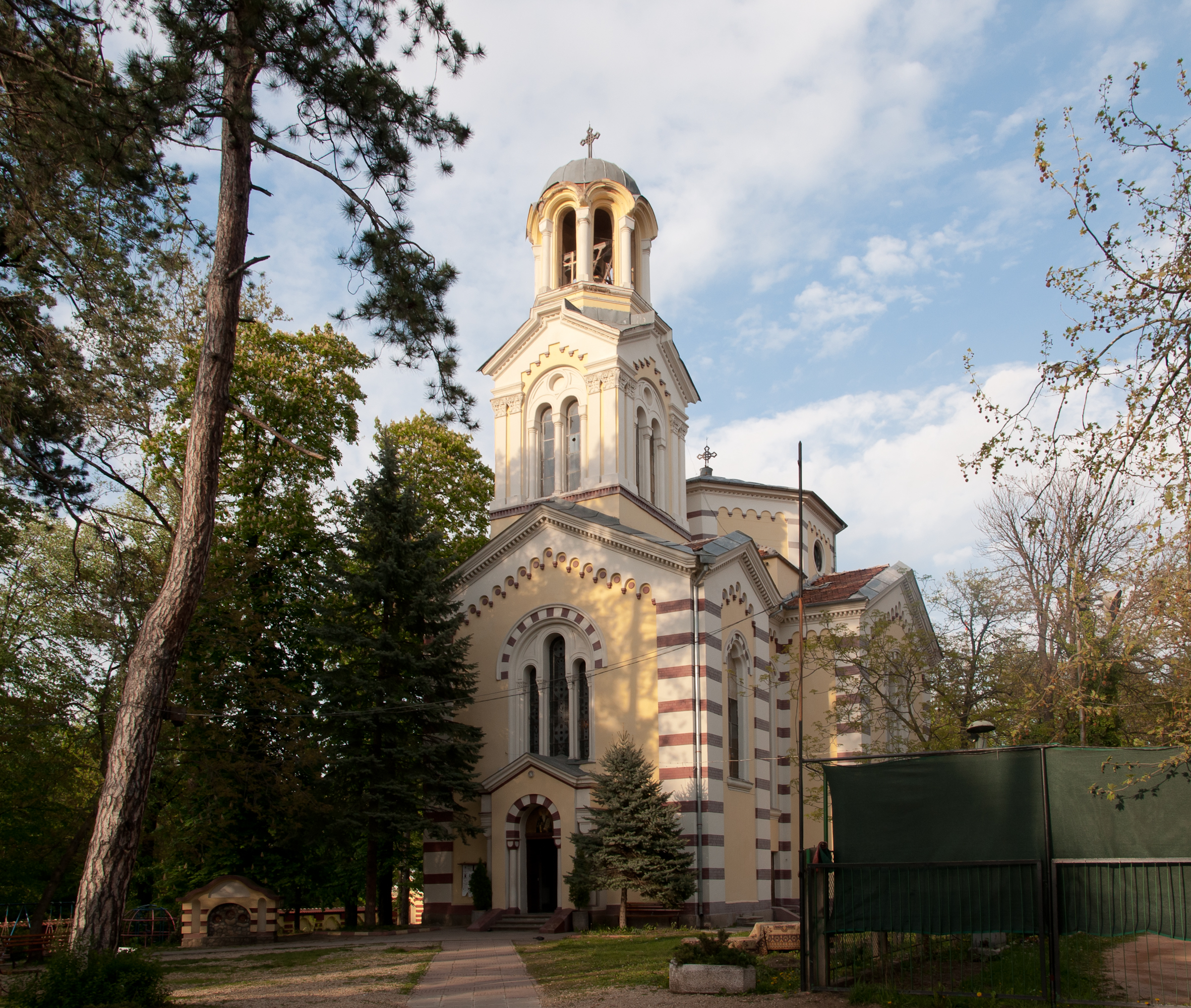
St Yoan Rilski church

The Sofia Seminary of St John of Rila (Bulgarian: Софийска духовна семинария „Св. Йоан Рилски“, Sofiyska duhovna seminariya „Sv. Yoan Rilski“), located in Sofia, the capital of Bulgaria, is the main seminary of the Bulgarian Orthodox Church and an ecclesiastical institution of high education.

Founded in 1876 in Samokov, the theological seminary continues and further develops what was started by the theological school at the Lyaskovets Monastery "St. Peter and Paul”. The Samokov Theological Seminary later moved to the capital of Bulgaria as the city council of Sofia donated a lot for the construction of a separate new seminary building.

The Sofia Seminary's construction began in 1902, when Knyaz Ferdinand of Bulgaria laid the foundation stone together with the chairman of the Holy Synod, Metropolitan Simeon of Varna and Veliki Preslav, in the presence of ministers and other influential figures. The complex, designed by Austro-Hungarian architect Friedrich Grünanger, who united Eclecticism with elements of traditional Byzantine architecture, was completed towards the end of 1902 and inaugurated on 20 January 1903. The Seminary Church of St John of Rila, a one-naved cross-domed basilica, was opened on 26 October 1904, St Demetrius' Day.

During the Balkan Wars (1912–1913) and the First World War (1914–1918) the seminary complex was used as a wartime hospital, and the Agrarianist rule of 1920-1923 opened an agricultural faculty inside. The events after the Second World War saw the forcible moving of the seminary to Cherepish and the use of the seminary complex in Sofia in turn as a Soviet Army headquarters (1944–1946), by the Union of the Soviet-Bulgarian Friendship (1946–1950) and a Palace of Pioneers (1951–1990).

In the spring of 1990 the buildings of the Sofia Seminary were given back to the Holy Synod and education was restored.
