= Sofia Central Mineral Baths =

Thermal springs and a building housing them

Coordinates: 42°41′57″N 23°19′26″E

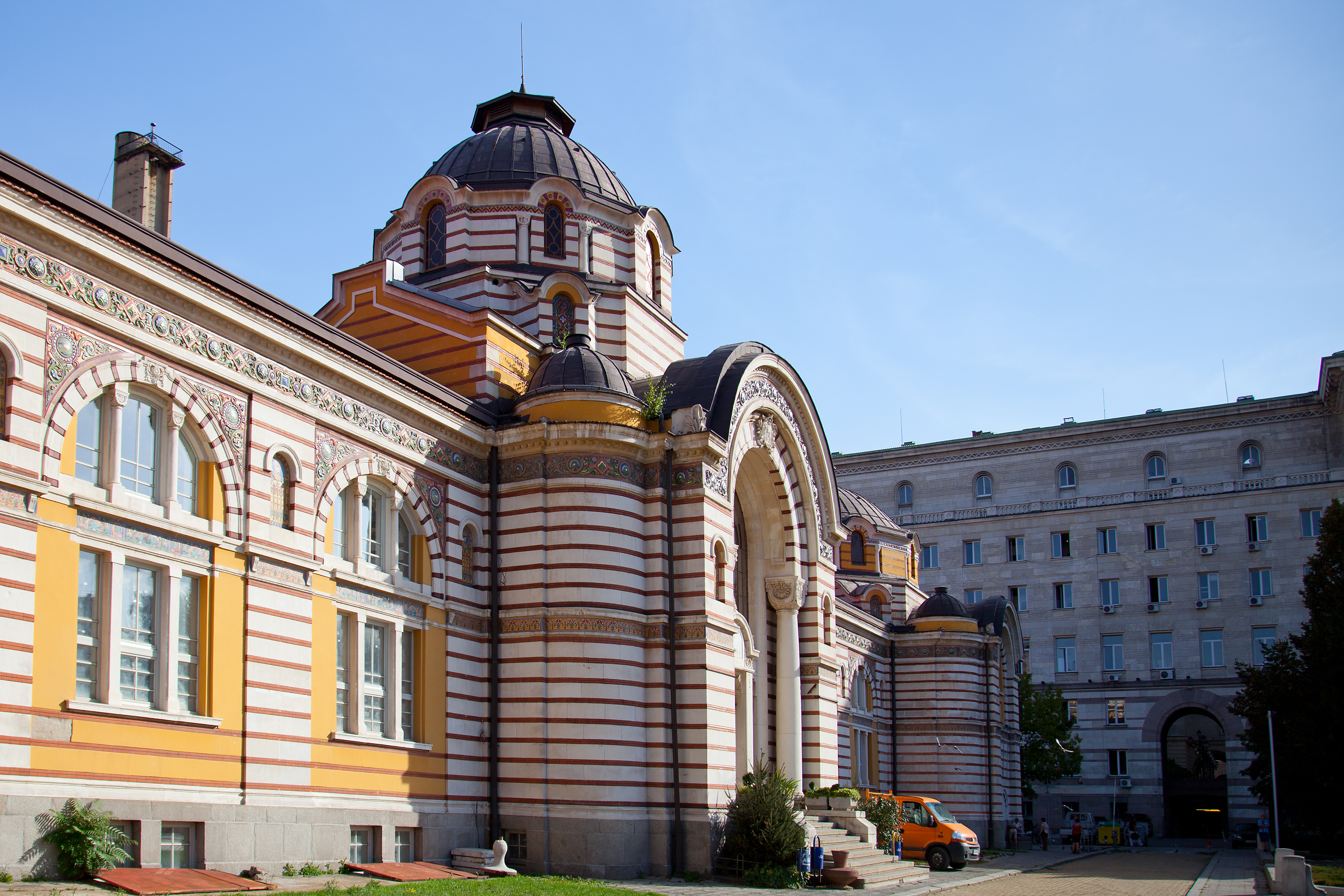
The Sofia Public Mineral Baths

The Central Mineral Baths (Централна минерална баня, Tsentralna mineralna banya) is a landmark in the city center of Sofia, the capital of Bulgaria, a city known for the mineral springs in the area. It was built in the early 20th century near the former destroyed Hammam (Turkish bathhouse), and was used as the city's public baths until 1986.

== History ==
Public baths have existed in Sofia since at least the 16th century. During the visit of Bohemian traveler Hans Dernschwam to Sofia in 1553–1555, Derschwam noted the presence of 1 large bath and 2 smaller baths on either side of the city. Dernschwam described the baths as follows:

The baths are located on the square; there is a big quadrangular building in front by the entrance, with a round Greek-style dome on top, like the Pantheon in Rome. It is richly covered in white marble … The big water conduits that lead the water into the baths are made of potter's clay. Each tube is approximately one Viennese cubit long and the separate tubes go through each other. They are plastered up like I have seen in Siebenbürgen (Transylvania) too, in old buildings in Thorenburg (Turda).

The current Central Mineral Baths building was designed in the Vienna Secession style, but integrating typically Bulgarian, Byzantine and Eastern Orthodox ornamental elements, by the architects Petko Momchilov and Friedrich Grünanger in 1904–1905 and approved on 30 January 1906, as projects by an Austrian (in 1889) and a French architect (in 1901) were declined. The raw construction was finished in 1908 and a Bulgarian company constructed the complex roof and the mineral water conduit. The baths opened on 13 May 1913, but the building was completely finished after 2 more years and a garden was arranged in front of the baths. Artists Haralampi Tachev and St. Dimitrov designed the building's ceramic majolica decoration.

The north wing was damaged during the bombing of Sofia in World War II, but was restored several years later.

== Closing ==
The baths continued to work as public baths until 1986, when the building was closed due to its bad condition and the possible collapse of the roof. It was subsequently partially reconstructed and thoroughly cleaned, and has accommodated the Sofia Historical Museum since September 2015.
