= Kaliopa House =

Bulgarian museum

Coordinates: 43°51′10″N 25°57′9″E

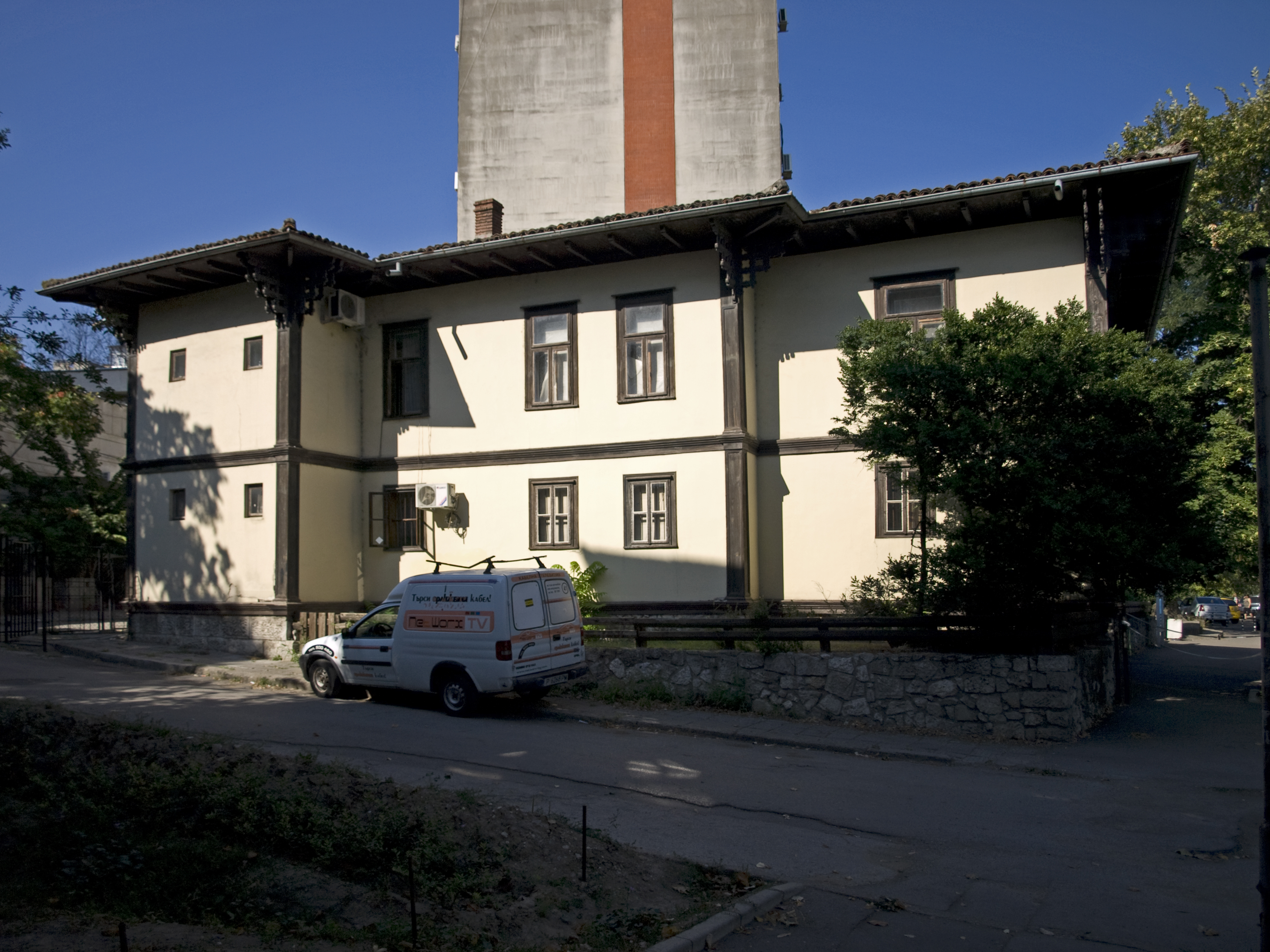
The Kaliopa House

The Kaliopa House (Bulgarian: Къщата на Калиопа), a popular name for the Bulgarian "Urban lifestyle of Rousse" museum (Bulgarian: Къща музей „Градски бит на Русе“), was built in 1864. According to a legend, the house was bestowed upon the beautiful Kaliopa (born Maria Kalish), the wife of the Prussian consul Kalish, by the governor of the Danubian Vilayet, Midhat Pasha, who was in love with her.

The facade's design resembles the style of houses in Plovdiv. The frescoes at the upper floor were crafted in 1896. The exposition represents the role of Rousse as a gateway towards Europe, and the influx of European urban culture into Bulgaria at the end of the 19th and the beginning of the 20th century. Sample interior layouts are shown, of a drawing-room, a living-room, a music hall and a bedroom, with furniture from Vienna, as well as collections of urban clothing, of jewellery and other accessories, of silverware (cutlery) and china, which mark the changes present in the daily life of Rousse citizens. The first grand piano imported into Bulgaria from Vienna can be seen here.
