= Zhelev =

Zhelev is a surname. Notable people with the surname include:

- Iliya Zhelev (born 1961), Bulgarian painter
- Mikhail Zhelev (1943–2021), Bulgarian athlete
- Ventsislav Zhelev (born 1980), Bulgarian footballer
- Zhelyo Zhelev (born 1987), Bulgarian footballer
- Zhelyu Zhelev (1935–2015), Bulgarian politician
- Zhivko Zhelev (born 1979), Bulgarian footballer
