= Thrace Foundation =

Bulgarian nonprofit organization

- Formation: 2004
- Founder: Vasil Bozhkov
- Founded at: Bulgaria
- Type: Nonprofit organization
- Legal status: foundation
- Key people: Vasil Bozhkov (Chairman), Professor Athanasios Sideris (Head curator)
- Website: www.thracefoundation.org/en/

Thrace Foundation is a non-profit organisation that supports the preservation of cultural heritage in Bulgaria and the world at large.

== History ==
Thrace Foundation was founded in 2004 by Vasil Bojkov with the purpose of preserving Bulgaria's cultural heritage alongside promoting, organising and supporting the preservation of cultural property both in Bulgaria and the wider world.

== Exhibitions ==
One of Thrace Foundation's activities is to organise exhibitions of artefacts from the Vasil Bojkov Collection. The NPO has put on several such exhibitions since its creation:

=== The Beauty of Bulgaria ===
The exhibition was opened on 8 January 2007, just days after Bulgaria's accession to the European Union. Forty artefacts from the Vasil Bojkov Collection were exhibited in the European Parliament building in Brussels.

The exhibition took place under the patronage of Professor Stefan Danailov, Bulgarian Minister of Culture, and Sir Graham Watson, Chair of the Liberal Group in the European Parliament. The exhibition's curator was Academician Svetlin Rusev.

=== Old Age in Antiquity ===
From 26 February to 7 June 2009, this international thematic exhibition including objects from Greek and Roman antiquity was held in the Landesmuseum located in Bonn, Germany. It was inspired by a quote from Greek philosopher Democritus (460-371 BC) who was born in Abdera.

=== Salvaged Treasures of Ancient Thrace ===
Between 15 April and 21 June 2009, a large team from the Thrace Foundation and Russia's State Museum of Eastern Art presented an exhibition titled The Salvaged Treasures of Ancient Thrace in Moscow, which featured elements from the Vassil Bojkov Collection. The exhibition was part of The Year of Bulgaria in Russia initiative and was held under the patronage of Russia's and Bulgaria's Ministries of Culture.

=== The Other Museum ===
This exhibition was the first public event of the new Bulgarian Union of Private Collectors. The organisation was established in March 2010, with Professor Valeri Stefanov as its chair. Sofia's National Gallery of Foreign Art unveiled the exhibition on 7 June 2010.

Art objects grouped into sections – archaeology, fine arts, numismatics, phaleristics, philately, weapons and their accessories, and ethnography – were gathered for the exhibition to show the special interests of private collectors.

=== Thrace and the Ancient World ===
This exhibition was opened at the National Museum of History on 21 March 2011. It was organised by the Thrace Foundation, the National Museum of History and the Bulgarian Union of Collectors, with Professor Ivan Marazov as its curator.

More than 230 exhibits of ancient Thracian art were selected for the exhibition, the earliest of which were bronze weapons dating from the 2nd millennium BC. The most remarkable objects included silver rhytons with gilding and protomes of a lion, ram, horse, goat, snake and calf. They were made between the 5th and 6th century BC.

=== Thracian Gold from Bulgaria. The Legends Come to Life ===
This exhibition took place between 30 September and 30 November 2013 at the State Historical Museum in Moscow. It was a joint exhibition featuring historical treasures from ancient times of Bulgarian state and private museums: National Museum of History, Regional Archaeological Museum – Plovdiv, Regional Museum of History – Vratsa, Regional Museum of History – Ruse, Regional Museum of History – Lovech, Thrace Foundation with the private Vasil Bojkov Museum and the museum of the Arete-Fol Foundation.

=== The Golden Fleece. The Path of the Argonauts ===
This was the seventh exhibition of objects from the Vasil Bojkov Collection. It was held from 16 March 2018 to 10 June 2018 at the National Art Gallery (The Palace).

The exhibition titled The Golden Fleece. The Path of the Argonauts Road featured 62 artefacts, 16 of which were shown to the general public for the very first time. The exhibition allowed visitors to follow in the footsteps of the Argonauts on their Fairy tale adventures. The exhibits transported the audience to ancient sacred places, such as Delphi and Samothrace, Thracian kingdoms, the lands of the legendary Amazons, the land of the sun Colchis and the holy island of Crete.

== Publishing ==
Another key activity of the Thrace Foundation is the publication of scientific literature relating to the promotion and preservation of Bulgaria's cultural heritage. In 2004, the Thrace Foundation established a publishing house of the same name.

=== Publications ===
- Catalogue of the Vasil Bojkov Collection (2004)
- The Beauty of Bulgaria (2007) – catalogue of objects in The Beauty of Bulgaria exhibition
- Salvaged Treasures of Ancient Thrace from the Vasil Bojkov Collection (2009) – catalogue of objects in the Salvaged Treasures of Ancient Thrace exhibition
- Thrace and the Ancient World – Vasil Bojkov Collection (2011) – catalogue of objects in Thrace and the Ancient World exhibition
- Metal Vessels and Utensils in the Vasil Bojkov Collection (2016)

== See also ==
- National Gallery for Foreign Art
- Art galleries in Sofia
- Thrace
- Thracian Bulgarians
- Culture of Bulgaria
- Bulgaria
- National Art Gallery (Bulgaria)
