= Art galleries in Sofia =

Sofia is home to many art galleries.

The fine art, also called visual arts, is presented to the public in national, municipal or private galleries, as well as on Internet-based galleries. Permanent, temporary, visiting or mixed expositions of Contemporary, Modern and Renaissance art is being presented.

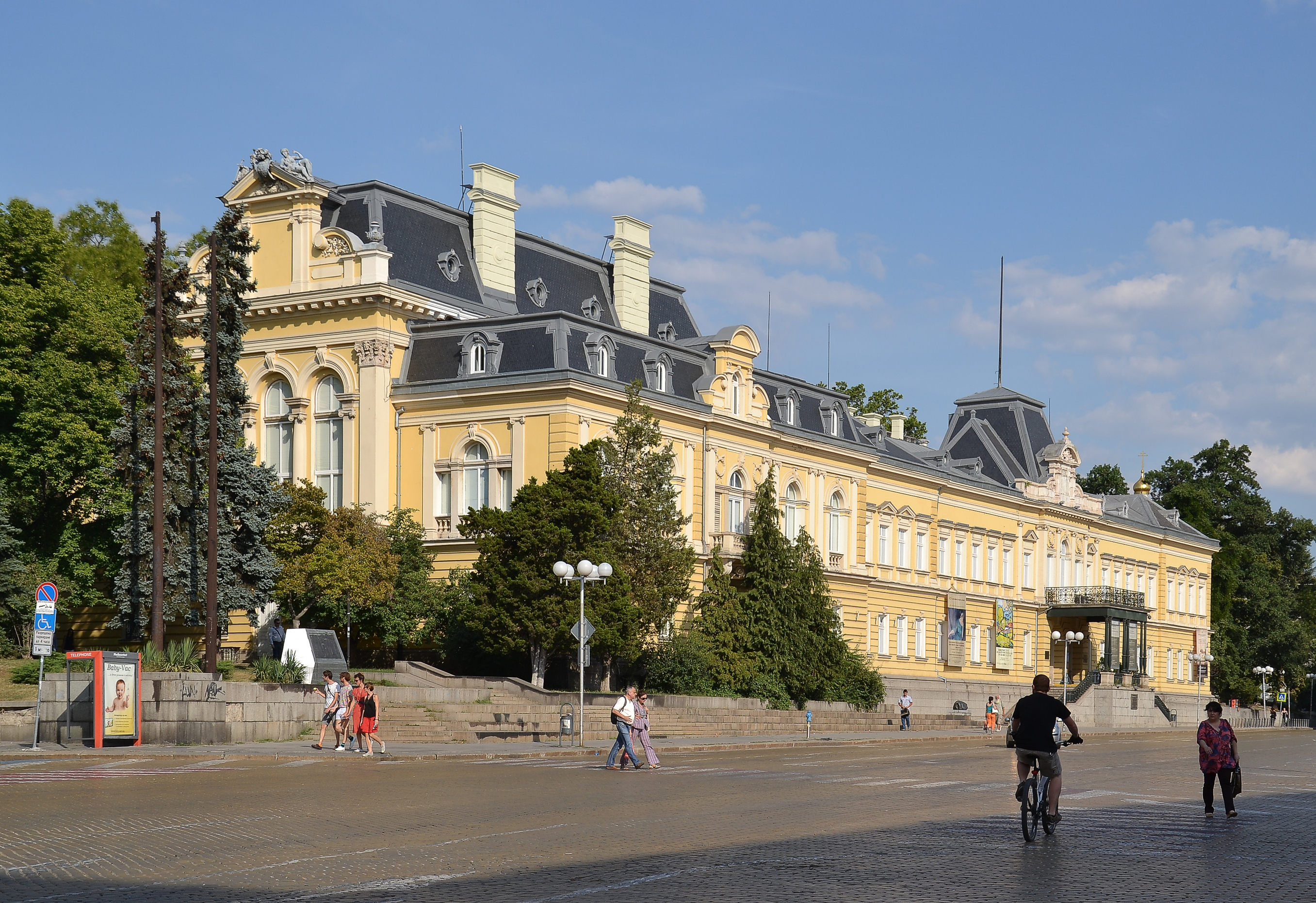
National Art Gallery in Sofia, Bulgaria

== National galleries ==
- National Art Gallery (part of the National Gallery);
- Square 500 (part of the National Gallery);
- National Gallery of Foreign Art (part of the National Gallery);
- Sofia Arsenal - Museum of Contemporary Art (part of the National Gallery);
- The crypt of the cathedral St. Alexander Nevsky (part of the National Gallery);
- National Museum of Bulgarian Fine Arts;
- National High School of Applied Arts "St. Luca";
- Museum of the Socialist Art (part of the National Gallery)

== State galleries ==
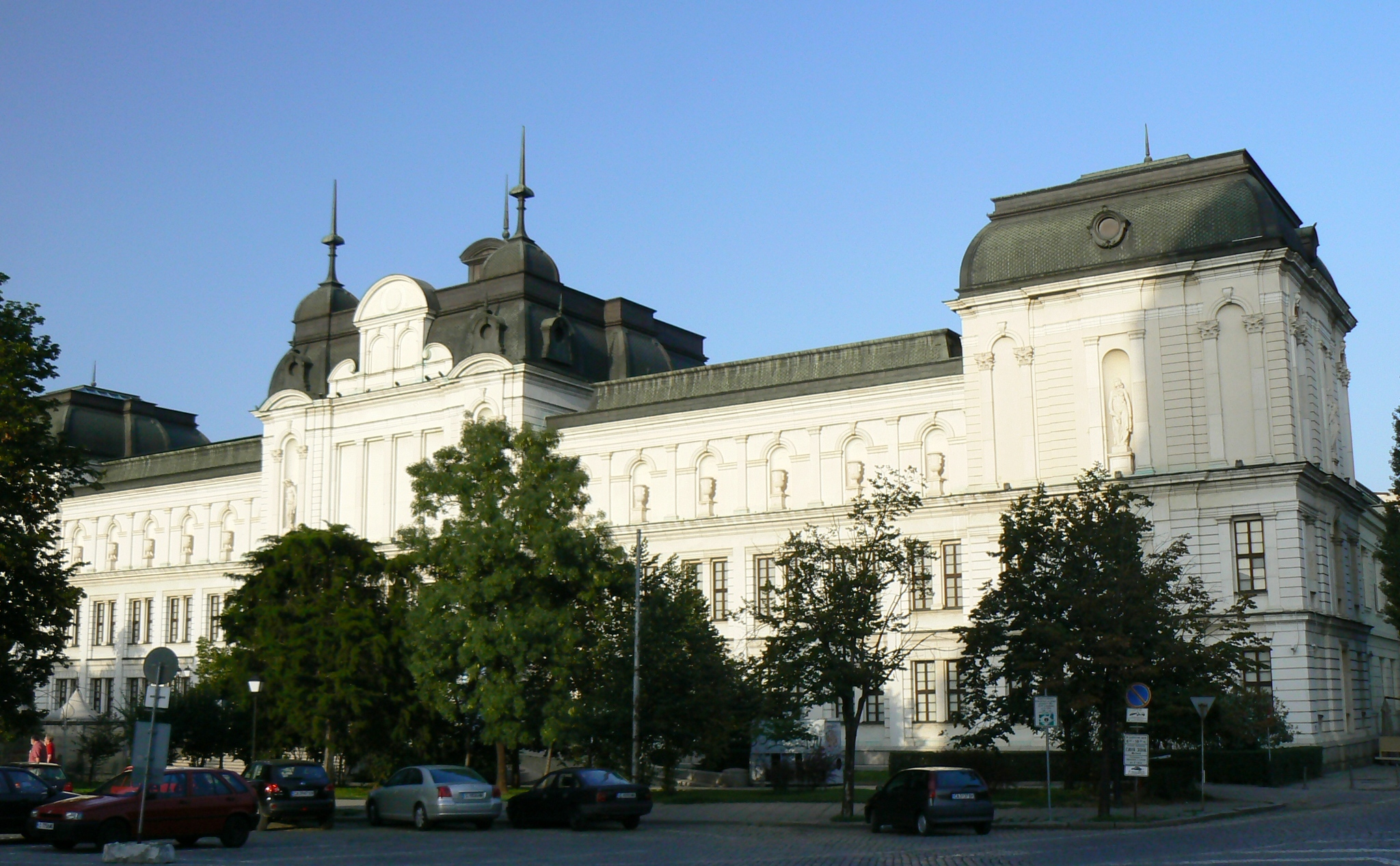
Foreign art gallery in Sofia, Bulgaria

- Sredets Gallery - Ministry of Culture;
- Bulgaria Gallery at the Sofia Philharmonic Orchestra;
- Debut Gallery at the National School of Fine Arts "Ilia Petrov" (High School of Fine Arts);
- Archives Exhibition Hall, Archives State Agency;
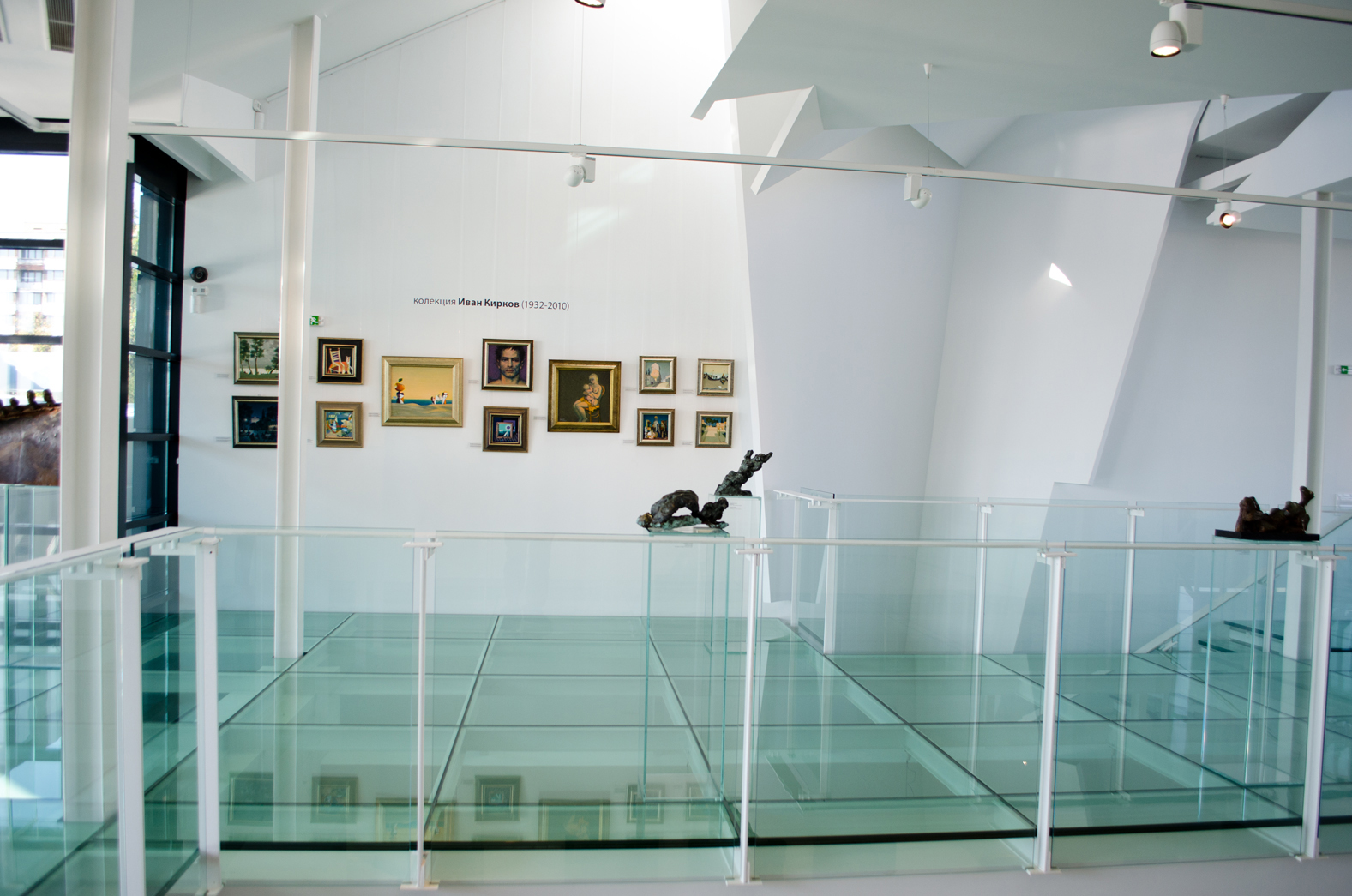
- New Bulgarian University - UniArt Gallery
  "Mission" Gallery, State Cultural Institute at the Ministry of Foreign Affairs

== Galleries at universities ==
- “Academia” Gallery at the National Academy of Art;
- “Art Box Academy” at the National Academy of Art;
- “Dondukov 56” at the National Academy of Art;
- “Faculty of Applied Arts - Tsarigradsko shose 73” at the National Academy of Fine Arts;
- “UniArt Gallery" - New Bulgarian University;
- Sofia University "St. Kliment Ohridski" - Alma Mater Gallery

== Municipal galleries ==
- Sofia City Art Gallery;
- Workshop - "Dechko Uzunov" Gallery;
- Vaska Emanouilova Gallery;
- The Gallery at the Professional High School of Fine Arts “Prof. Nikolay Raynov”

== Other public galleries ==
- Shipka 6 Str. Gallery, Union of the Bulgarian Artists;
- "Rayko Alexiev" Gallery, Union of the Bulgarian Artists;
- Gallery - bookstore "Sofia Press", Union of the Bulgarian Artists;
- Gallery at the Union of the Architects in Bulgaria;
- Gallery at the Union of Bulgarian Composers;
- The Red House - Center for Culture and Debates;
- Gallery Gallery - Router gallery focussed on digital art
- "Valer art" -contemporary and modern art

== Galleries at foreign cultural institutes ==
- Instituto Cervantes
- Polish Cultural Institute
- Russian Cultural and Information Center
- Finnish Embassy
- French Institute
