= Tsewang Lhamo (singer) =

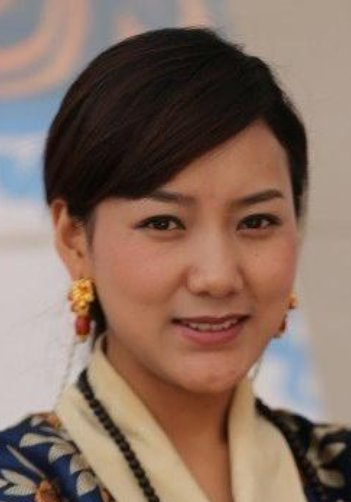
- Tsewang in 2015

Background information
- Born: June 16, 1985 (age 40); Luhuo County, Garzê Tibetan Autonomous Prefecture, Sichuan, China

Tsewang Lhamo (Tibetan: ཚེ་དབང་ལྷ་མོ།; born June 15, 1985) is a Tibetan singer.

== Biography ==
In 2011, Tsewang went to the United States to perform at a concert organized by the Thrace Foundation in conjunction with the International Conference on Tibetan Language, and received a joyous welcome from Tibetans in NYC who were able to see her for the first time. She released her first solo album, Gangri Bumo, in 2012. It became a hit with Tibetan audiences. Her second album, The Girl from the Tibetan Plateau, which was sung entirely in Tibetan, was released in 2012.

Tsewang is popular in the Tibetan community, as well as in Himalayan country, Nepal, and northern India. She sings both old Tibetan folk and pop songs, and has released 30 songs and 5 albums. In May 2017, Tsewang released a duet with lead Tibetan singer Sherten in tribute to His Highness the 17th Karmapa Ogyen Trinley Dorje.

== Discography ==
- Nagchu Circle dance
- The Girl from the Tibetan Plateau (2012)
