= Portrait of Eliezer Alshekh =

1928 painting by Kiril Tsonev

- Портрет на Елиезер Алшех (Bulgarian)
- Artist: Kiril Tsonev
- Year: 1928
- Medium: oil on canvas
- Dimensions: 54 cm × 39 cm (21 in × 15 in)
- Location: National Art Gallery (Bulgaria)

Portrait of Eliezer Alsheh is a picture of Bulgarian artist, by Kiril Tsonev from 1928.

== Analysis ==
The picture is painted with oil on canvas. It represents a portrait of Bulgarian and Argentinean artist Eliezer Alsheh.

== Description ==
The dimensions of the picture are 54 × 39 cm. It is at the National Art Gallery (Bulgaria) in Sofia.
