= Todor Todorov (footballer, born November 1982) =

Bulgarian footballer

Personal information
- Full name: Todor Marinov Todorov
- Date of birth: 28 November 1982 (age 43)
- Place of birth: Harmanli, Bulgaria
- Height: 1.82 m (5 ft 11 1/2 in)
- Position: Centre back

Youth career
- Hebros Harmanli

Senior career*
Years	Team	Apps	(Gls)
2001–2005	Hebros Harmanli		
2005–2007	Minyor Radnevo	38	(0)
2008–2011	Beroe	48	(1)
2011	Neftochimic Burgas	7	(0)
- * Club domestic league appearances and goals as of 18 January 2012

Todor Todorov (Bulgarian: Tодор Тодоров; born 28 November 1982) is a Bulgarian footballer who plays as a defender.

== Honours ==
=== Club ===
- Beroe
  - Bulgarian Cup:
    - Winner: 2009-10
