= Saint Alexander Nevsky Cathedral, Sofia =

Bulgarian Orthodox cathedral in Sofia

St. Alexander Nevsky Cathedral
- Храм-паметник "Свети Александър Невски"
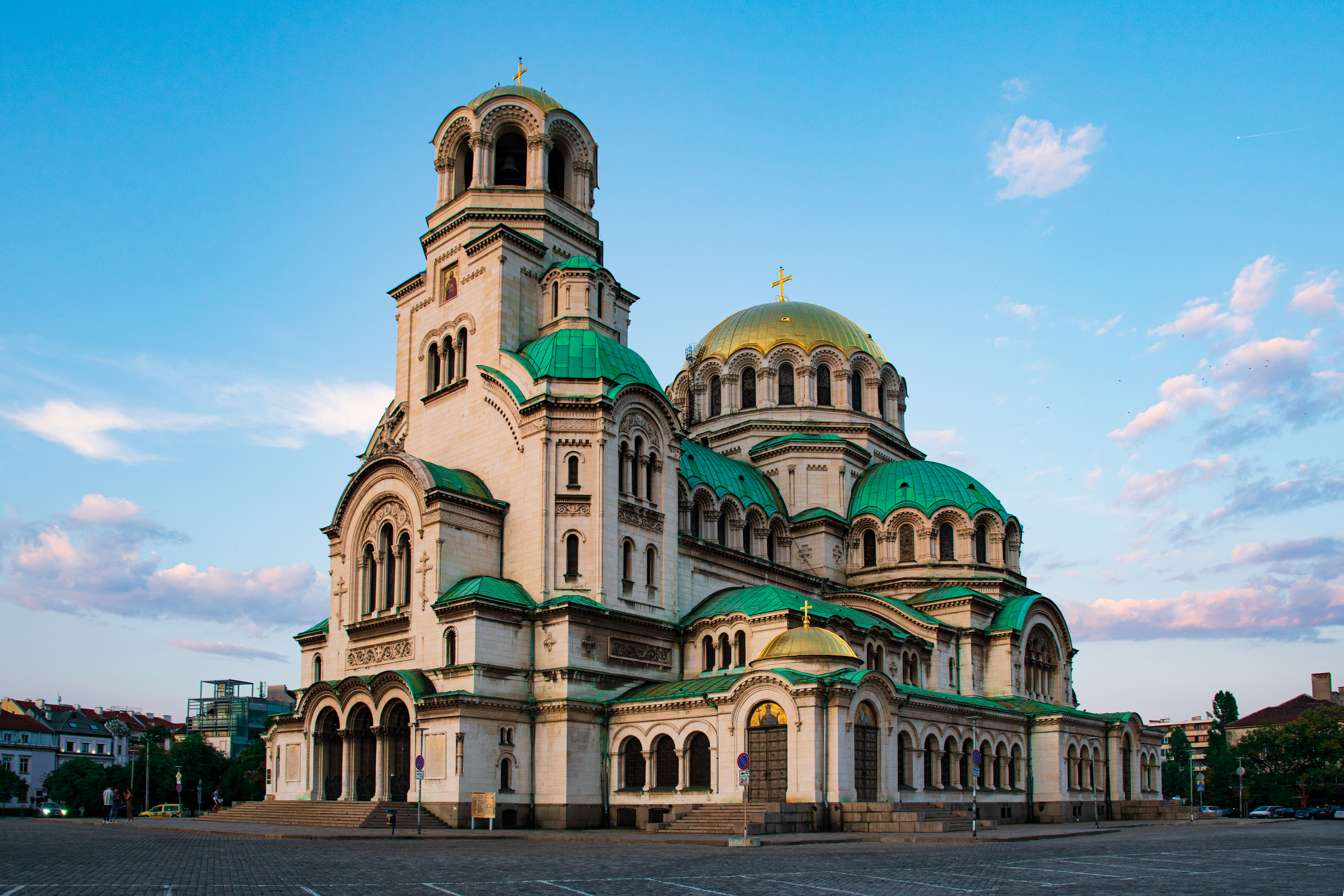
- The cathedral in 2019

- Location of the cathedral in Sofia
- St. Alexander Nevsky Cathedral
- 42°41′45″N 23°19′59″E
- Location: Sofia
- Country: Bulgaria
- Denomination: Eastern Orthodox
- Tradition: Bulgarian Orthodox
- Website: cathedral.bg

History
- Status: Stauropegion
- Dedication: St. Alexander Nevsky
- Consecrated: 1924

Architecture
- Architect: Alexander Pomerantsev
- Architectural type: Basilica
- Style: Neo-Byzantine
- Groundbreaking: 3 March 1882
- Completed: 1912

Specifications
- Capacity: 5,000 worshipers
- Length: 73.5 m (241 ft)
- Width: 52.2 m (171 ft)

Administration
- Province: Patriarch of Bulgaria

Clergy
- Bishop: Daniil of Bulgaria

The St. Alexander Nevsky Cathedral (Bulgarian: Храм-паметник "Свети Александър Невски", romanized: Hram-pametnik "Sveti Aleksandar Nevski") is a Bulgarian Orthodox cathedral in Sofia, the capital of Bulgaria. Built in the Neo-Byzantine style, it serves as the cathedral church of the Patriarch of Bulgaria and it is one of the largest Christian church buildings by volume in the world. It is one of Sofia's symbols and primary tourist attractions. St. Alexander Nevsky Cathedral in Sofia occupies an area of 3,170 square metres (34,100 sq ft) and can hold 5,000 worshipers. It is among the ten largest Eastern Orthodox church buildings.

== History, architecture and construction ==
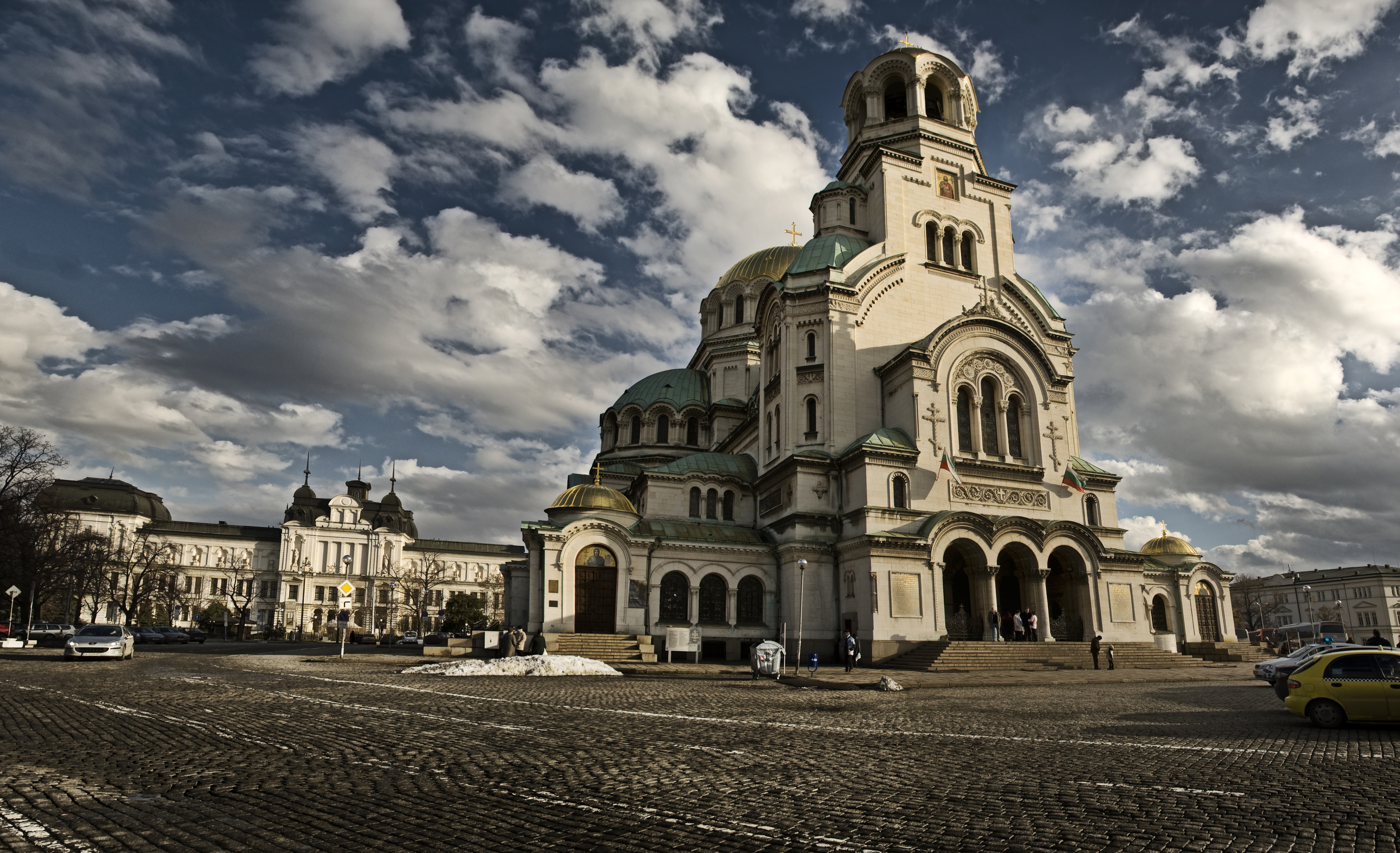
Alexander Nevsky Cathedral and the National Gallery for Foreign Art behind.

The construction of the St. Alexander Nevsky Cathedral started in 1882 (having been planned since 19 February 1879), when the foundation stone was laid, but most of it was built between 1904 and 1912. Saint Alexander Nevsky was a Russian prince. The cathedral was created in honour to the Russian soldiers who died during the Russo-Turkish War of 1877–1878, as a result of which Bulgaria was liberated from Ottoman rule.

The cathedral was designed by Alexander Pomerantsev, aided by Alexander Smirnov and Alexander Yakovlev, as the initial 1884–1885 project of Ivan Bogomolov was radically changed by Pomerantsev. The final design was finished in 1898, and the construction and decoration were done by a team of Bulgarian, Russian, Austro-Hungarian and other European artists, architects and workers, including the aforementioned architects, as well as Petko Momchilov, Yordan Milanov, Haralampi Tachev, Ivan Mrkvička, Vasily Bolotnov, Nikolay Bruni, Alexander Kiselyov, Anton Mitov and many others.

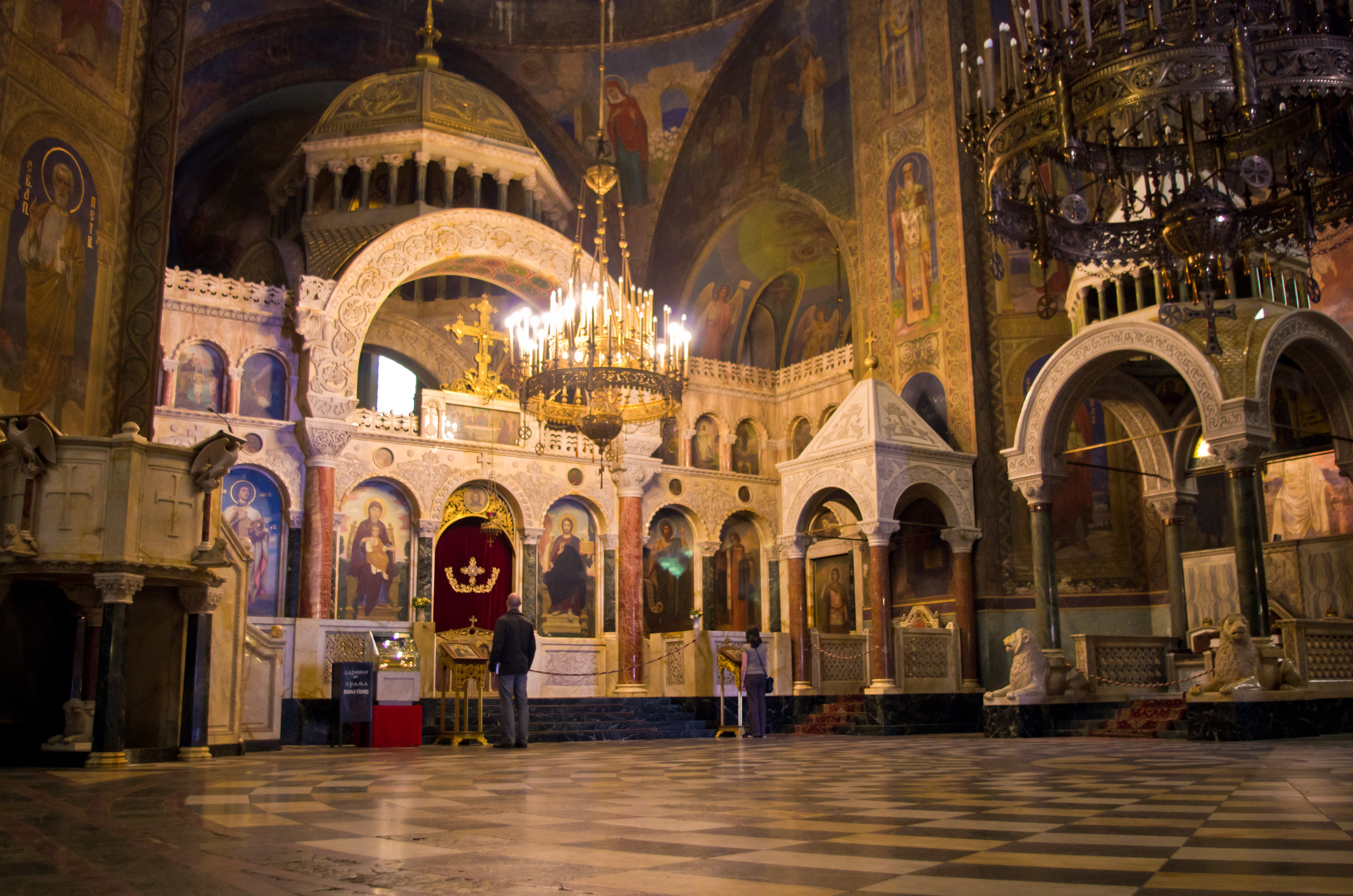
Interior

The marble parts and the lighting fixtures were created in Munich, the metal elements for the gates in Berlin, while the gates themselves were manufactured in Karl Bamberg's factory in Vienna, and the mosaics were shipped from Venice.

The Alexander Nevsky Cathedral is a cross-domed basilica featuring an emphasized central dome. The cathedral's gold-plated dome is 45 m high (148 ft) (46.3 m (152 ft) with the cross), with the bell tower reaching 53 metres (174 ft). The roof span of the central nave is 28 metres (92 ft) The temple has 12 bells with total weight of 23 tons, the heaviest weighing 12 tons and the lightest 10 kilograms (22 lb). The interior is decorated with Italian marble in various colours, Brazilian onyx, alabaster, and other luxurious materials. The central dome has the Lord's Prayer inscribed around it, with thin gold letters.

There are many churches in Bulgaria which are smaller copies of the St. Alexander Nevsky Cathedral like the temples in the following towns: Valchedram, Sandanski, Dolna Mitropoliya, Kyustendil, Kaspichan, Breznik, Dorkovo village.

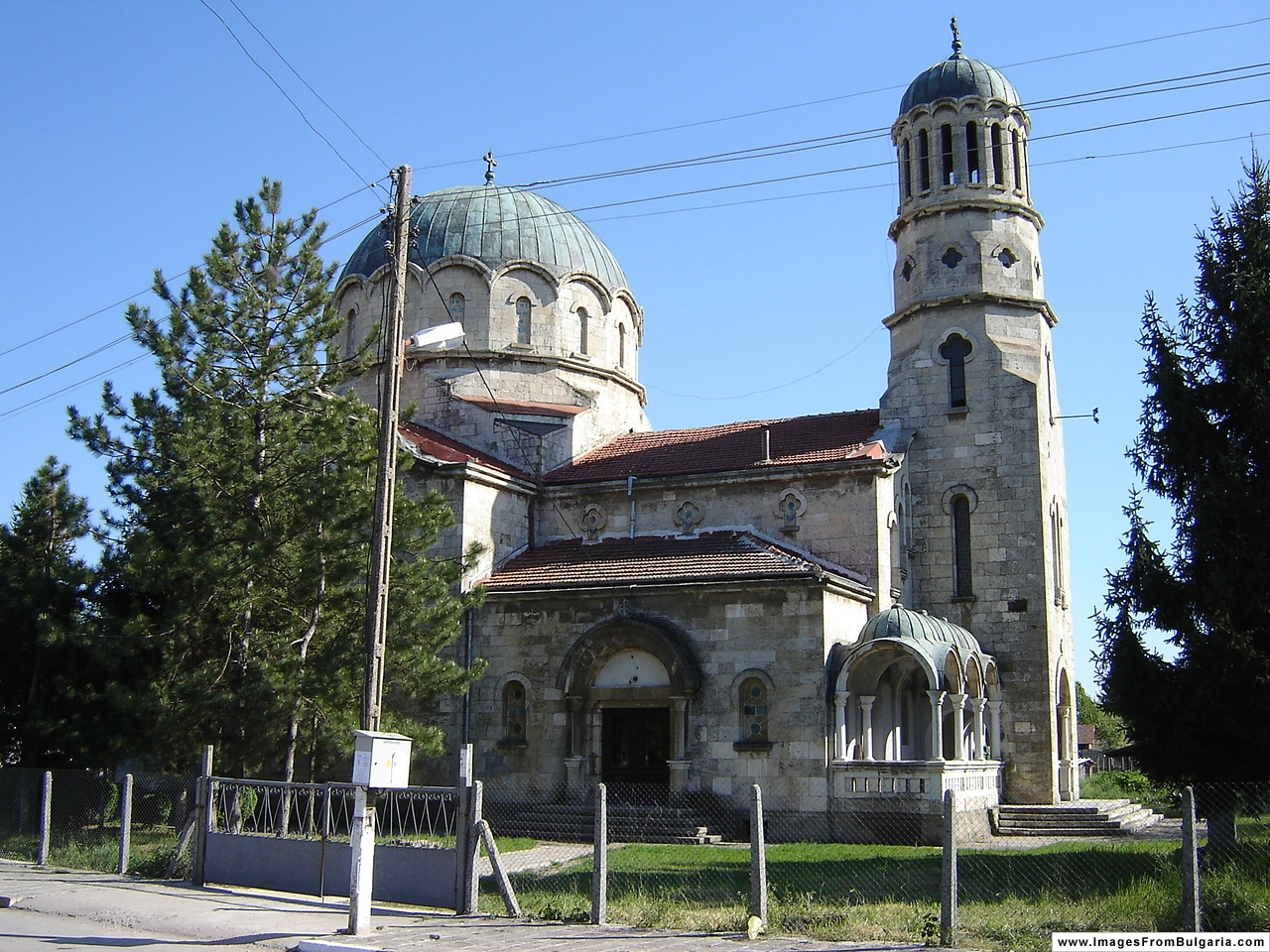
Church of St. Paraskeva in Valchedram

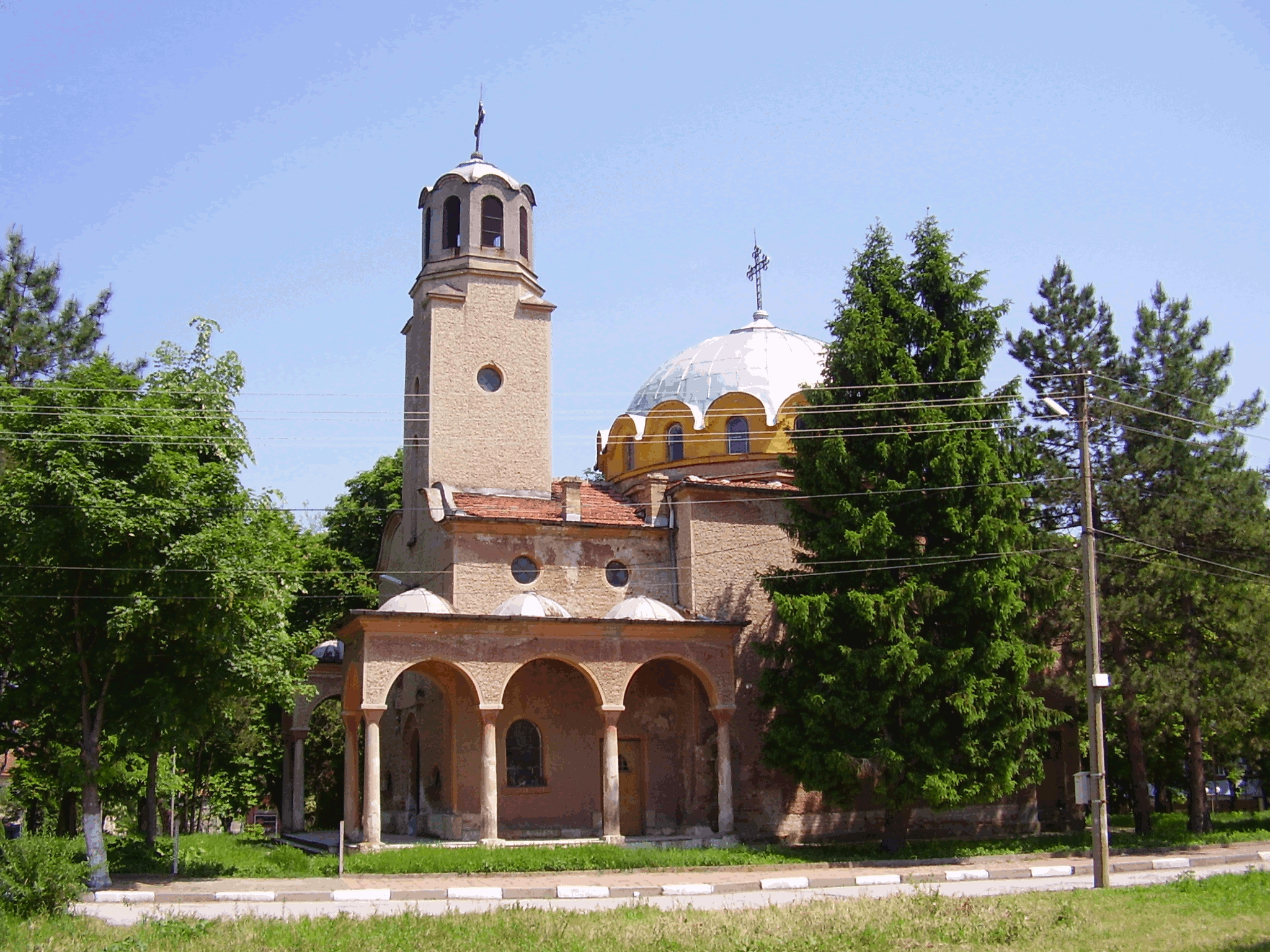
Church of St. Demetrius in Dolna Mitropoliya

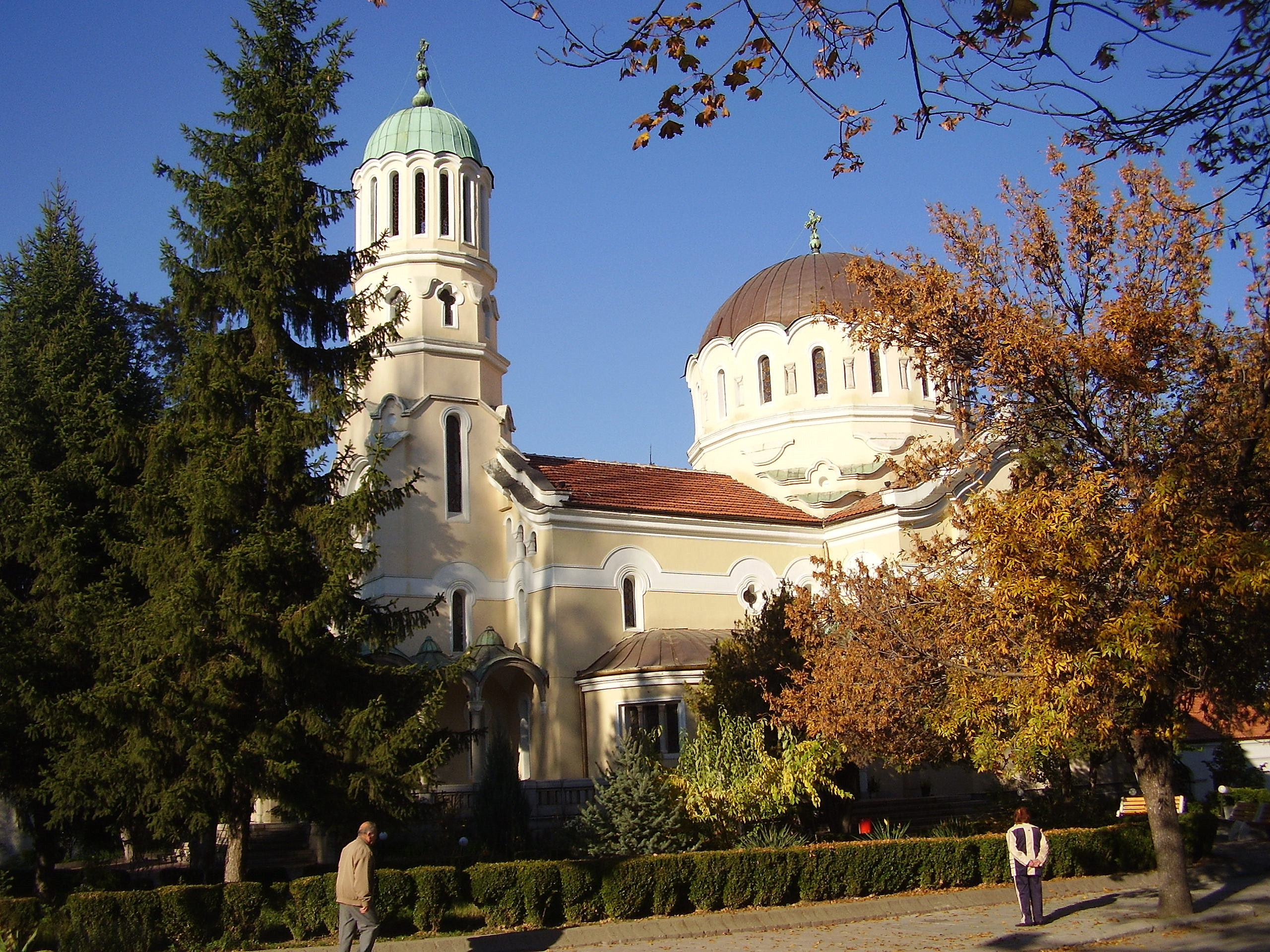
The Church of Saint Menas in Kyustendil

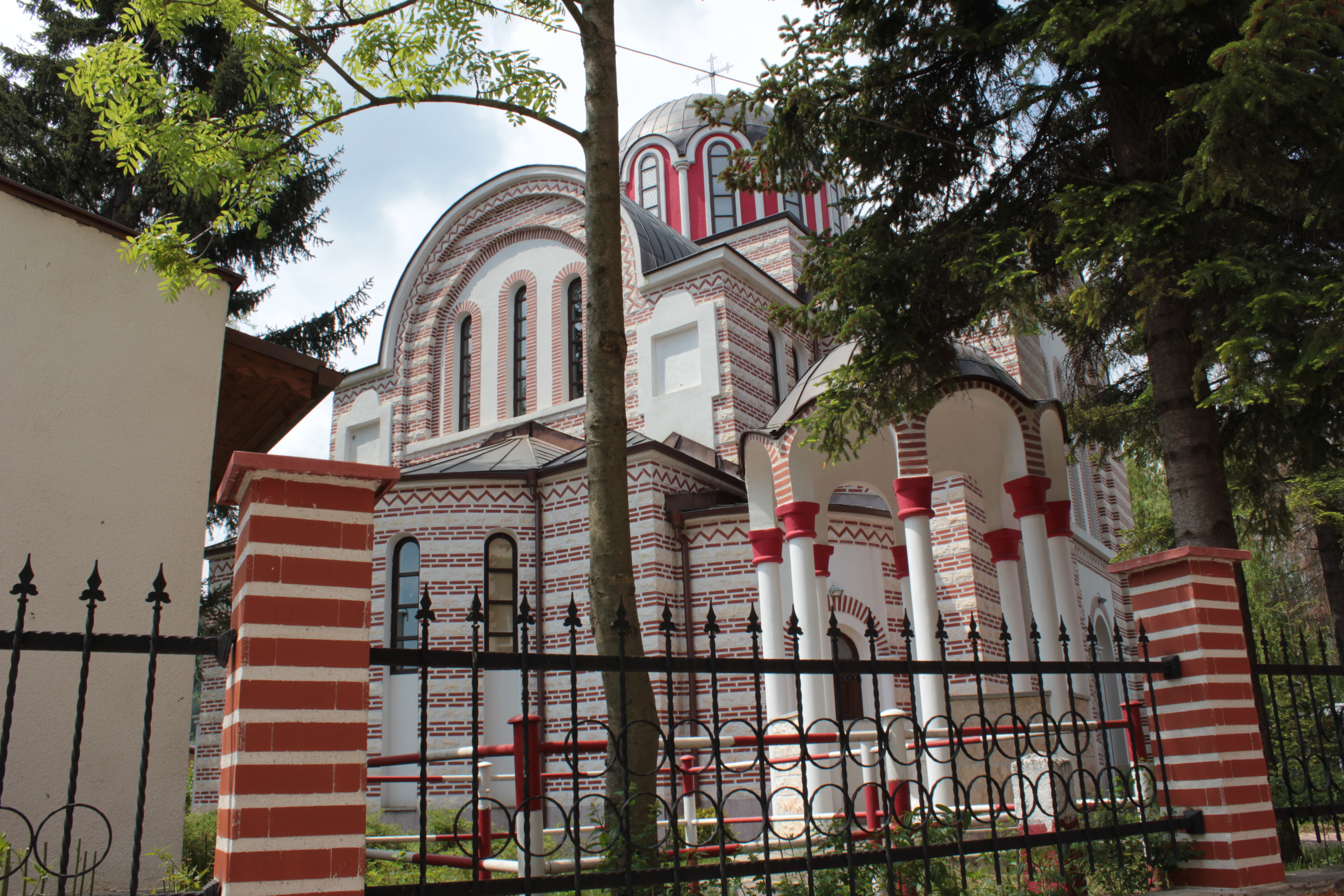
Saint George Church in Breznik

== Name changes ==
The name of the cathedral was briefly changed to the Sts. Cyril and Methodius Cathedral between 1916 and 1920 (since Bulgaria and Russia belonged to opposing alliances in World War I), but then the initial name was restored. The St. Alexander Nevsky Cathedral was consecrated on 12 September 1924 and in 1955 was declared a cultural monument.

== Relics ==
To the left of the altar is a case displaying relics of Alexander Nevsky, given by the Russian Orthodox Church. Although the accompanying Bulgarian language plaque refers simply to "relics" (мощи), the item on display appears to be a piece of a rib.

== Museum and market ==
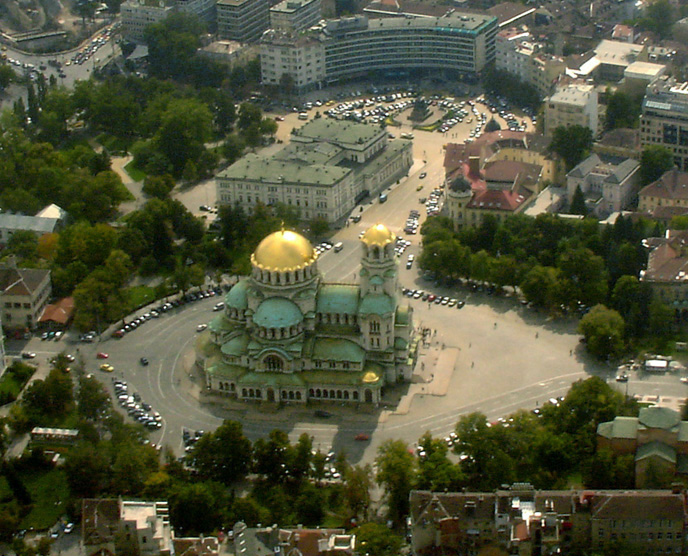
Alexander Nevsky Cathedral in Sofia, with the parliament behind.

There is a museum of Bulgarian icons inside the cathedral's crypt, part of the National Art Gallery. The cathedral claims that the museum contains the largest collection of Orthodox icons in Europe.

== Nearby locations ==
The cathedral is adjacent to St. Sofia Church, the church for which the city of Sofia is named. Other notable landmarks in the immediate vicinity of the cathedral are the Monument to the Unknown Soldier, the Bulgarian Academy of Sciences, the National Gallery of Foreign Art, the National Art Academy, the Bulgarian Parliament, a park honoring Ivan Vazov with his monument and gravestone, the Sofia Opera and Ballet Theater, and a park where one can buy handmade textiles, icons, and antiques in a small flea market.

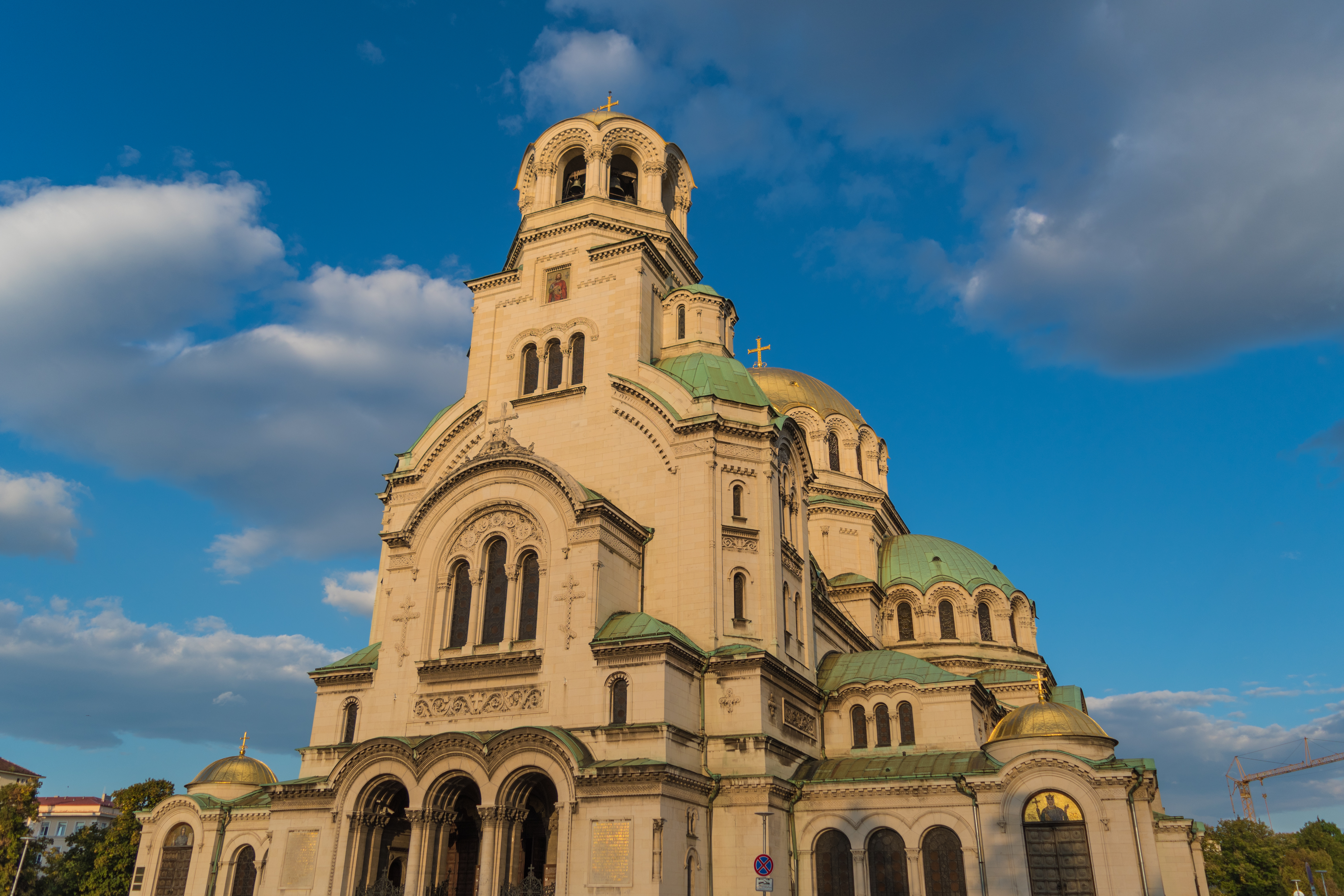
Alexander Nevsky Cathedral, Sofia at Sunset Entrance

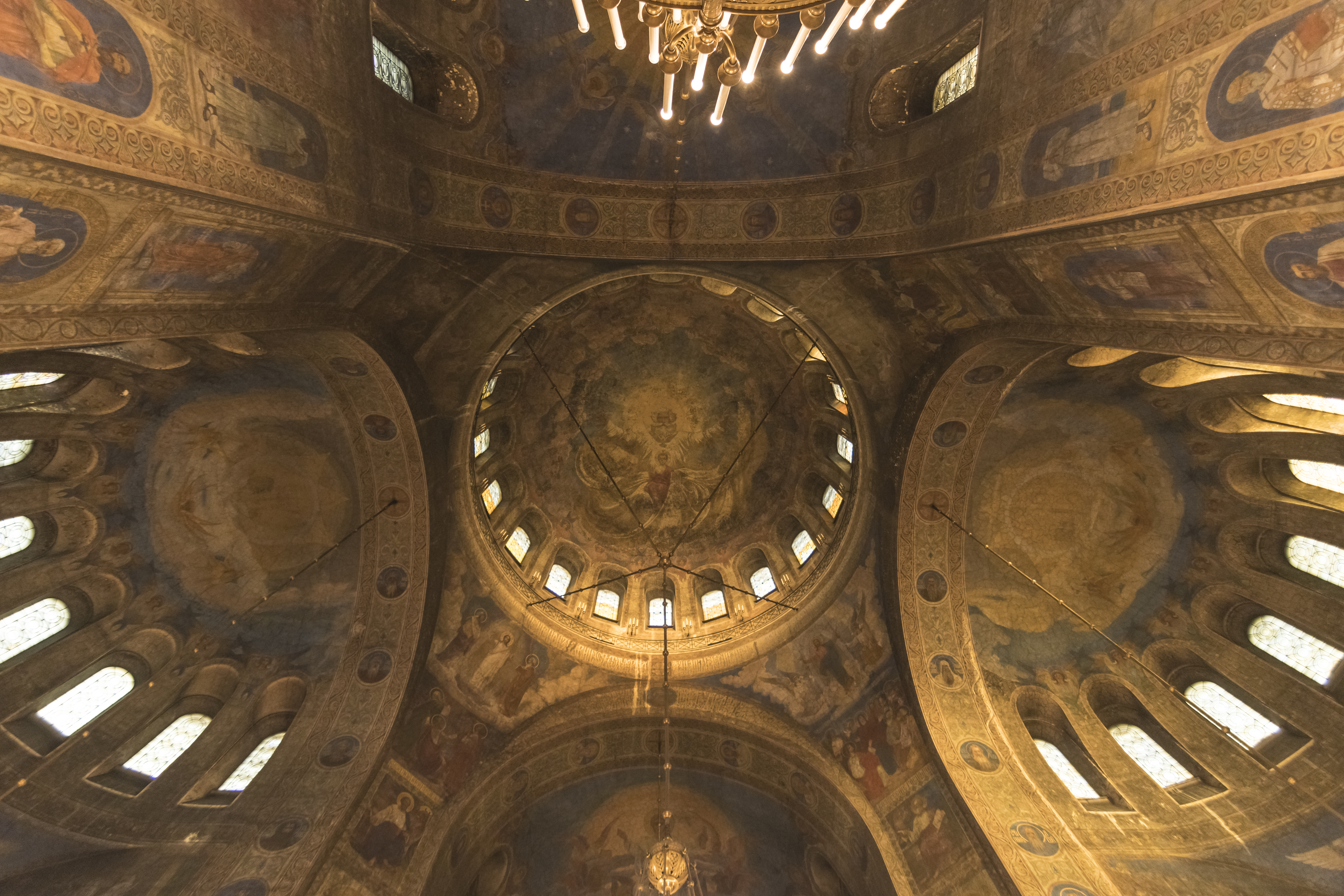
Alexander Nevsky Cathedral Ceiling Interior

== Gallery ==
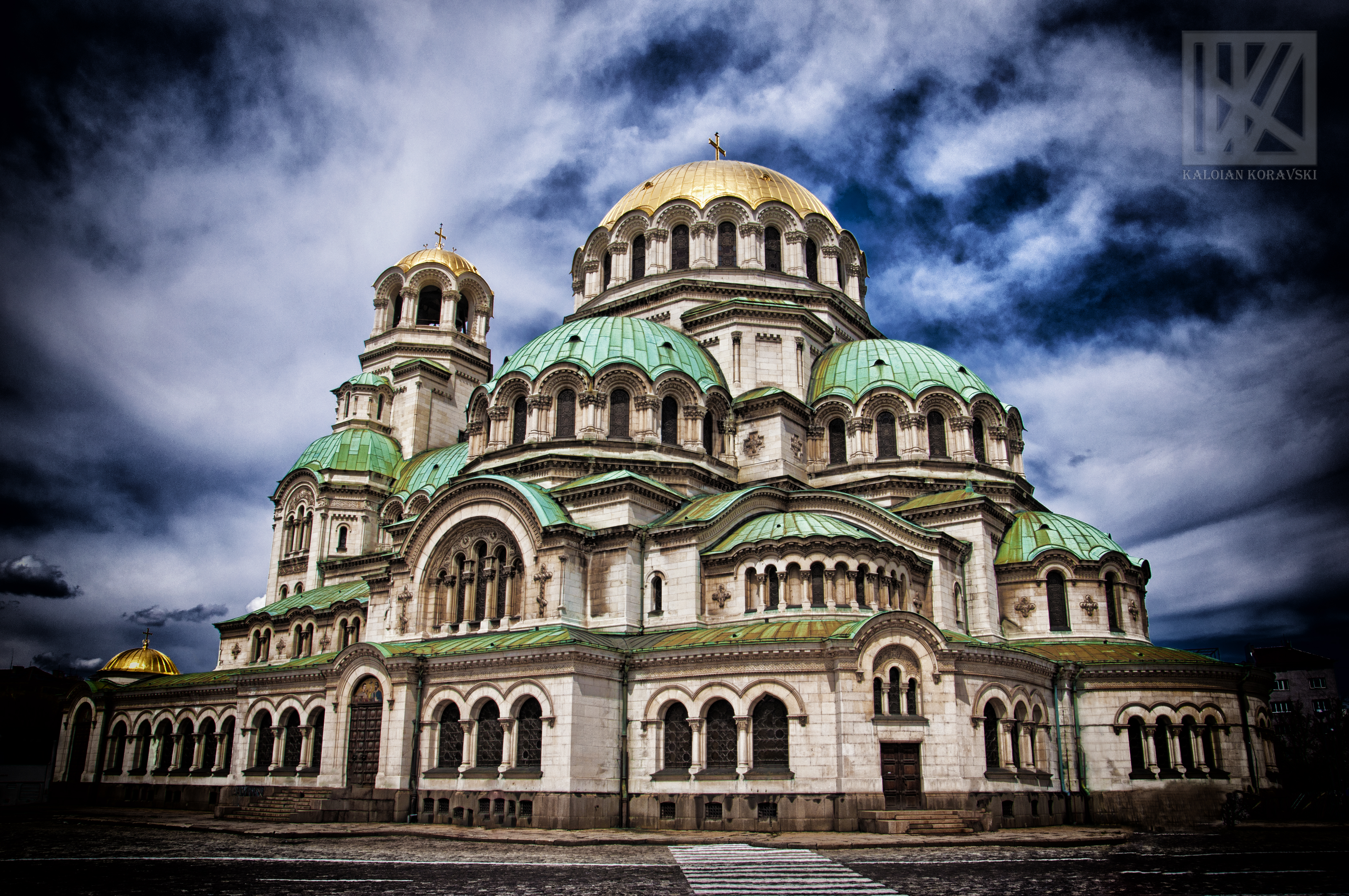
Alexander Nevsky Cathedral

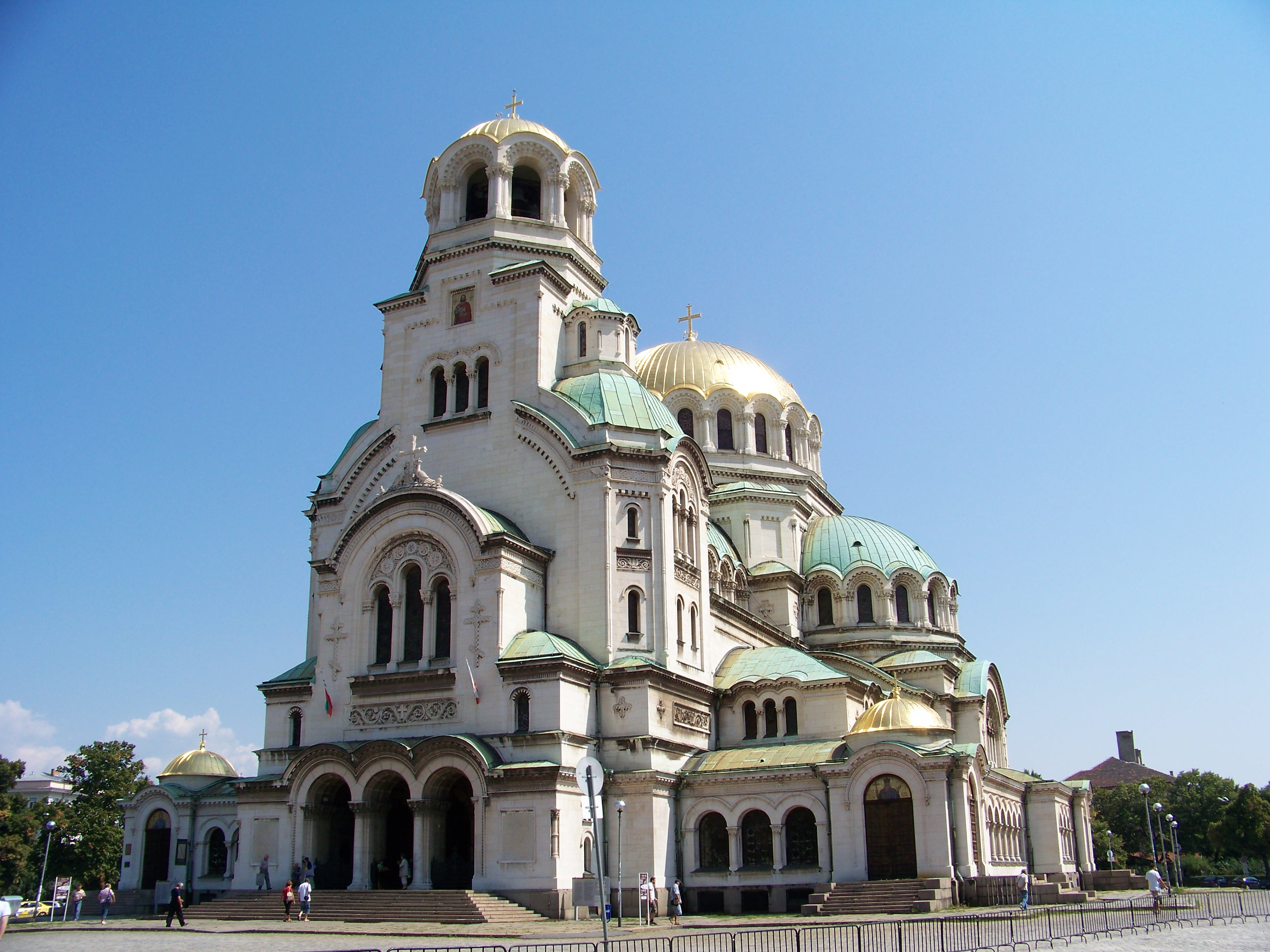
Front facade

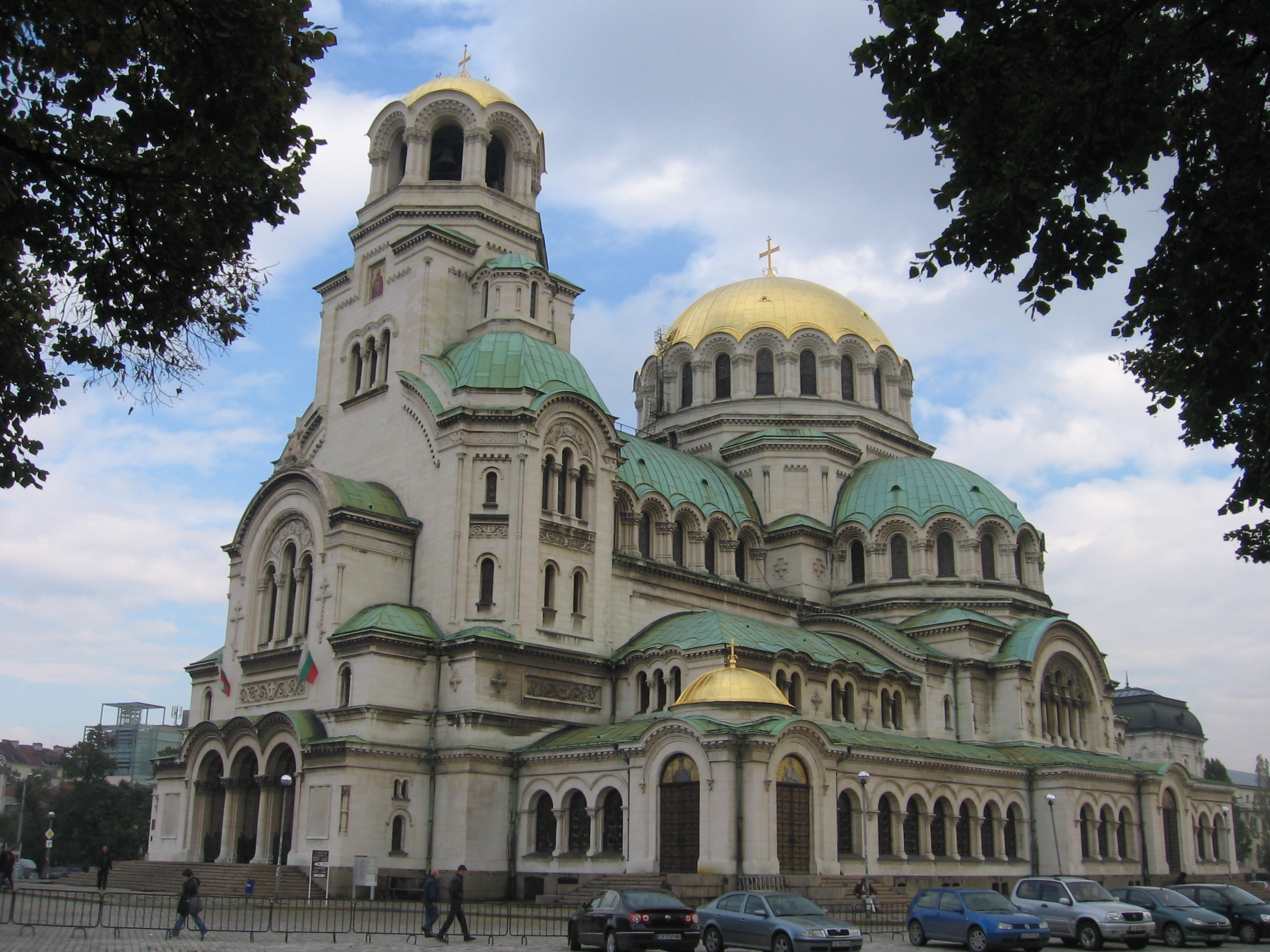
Main facade

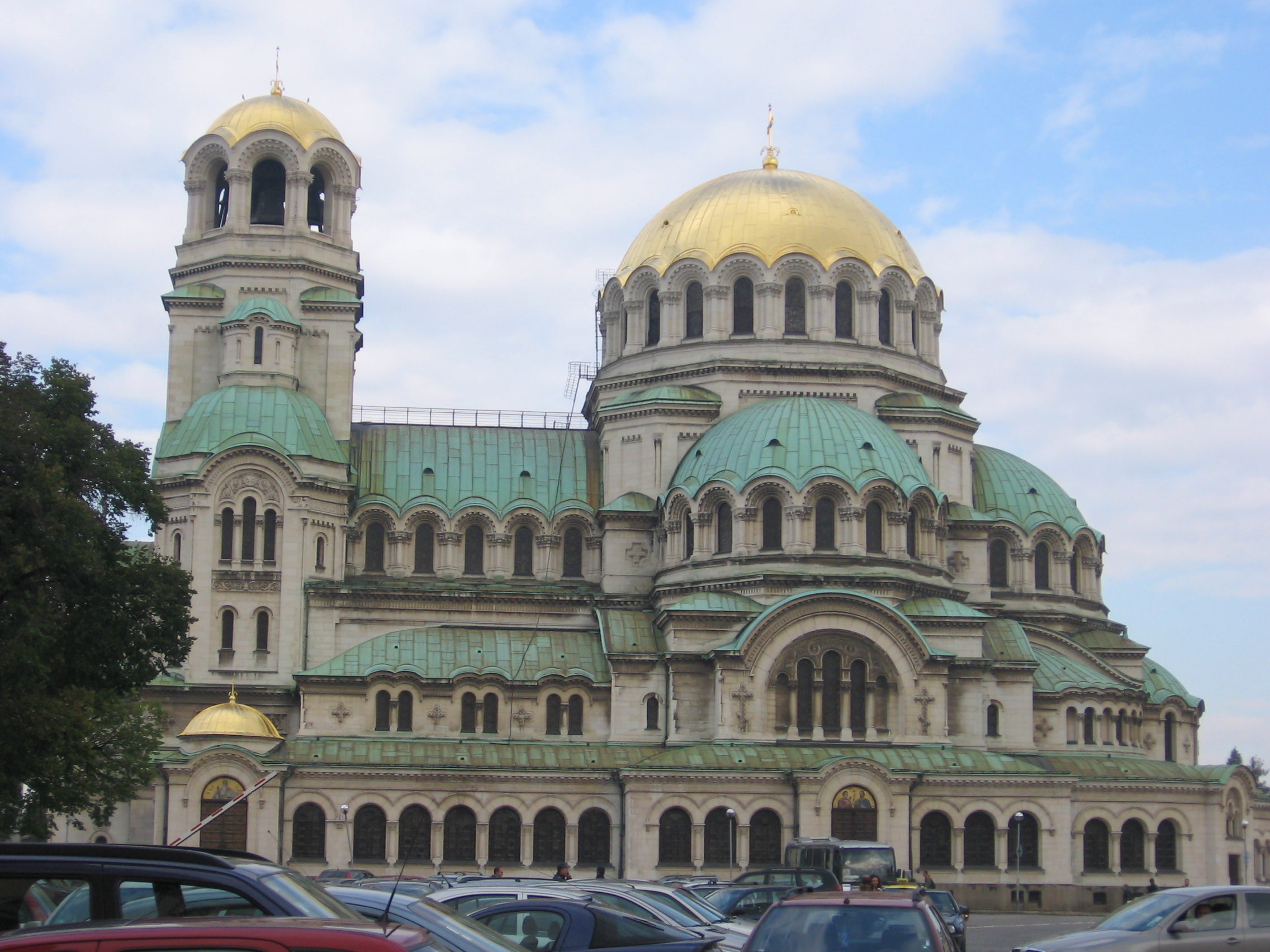
Side facade

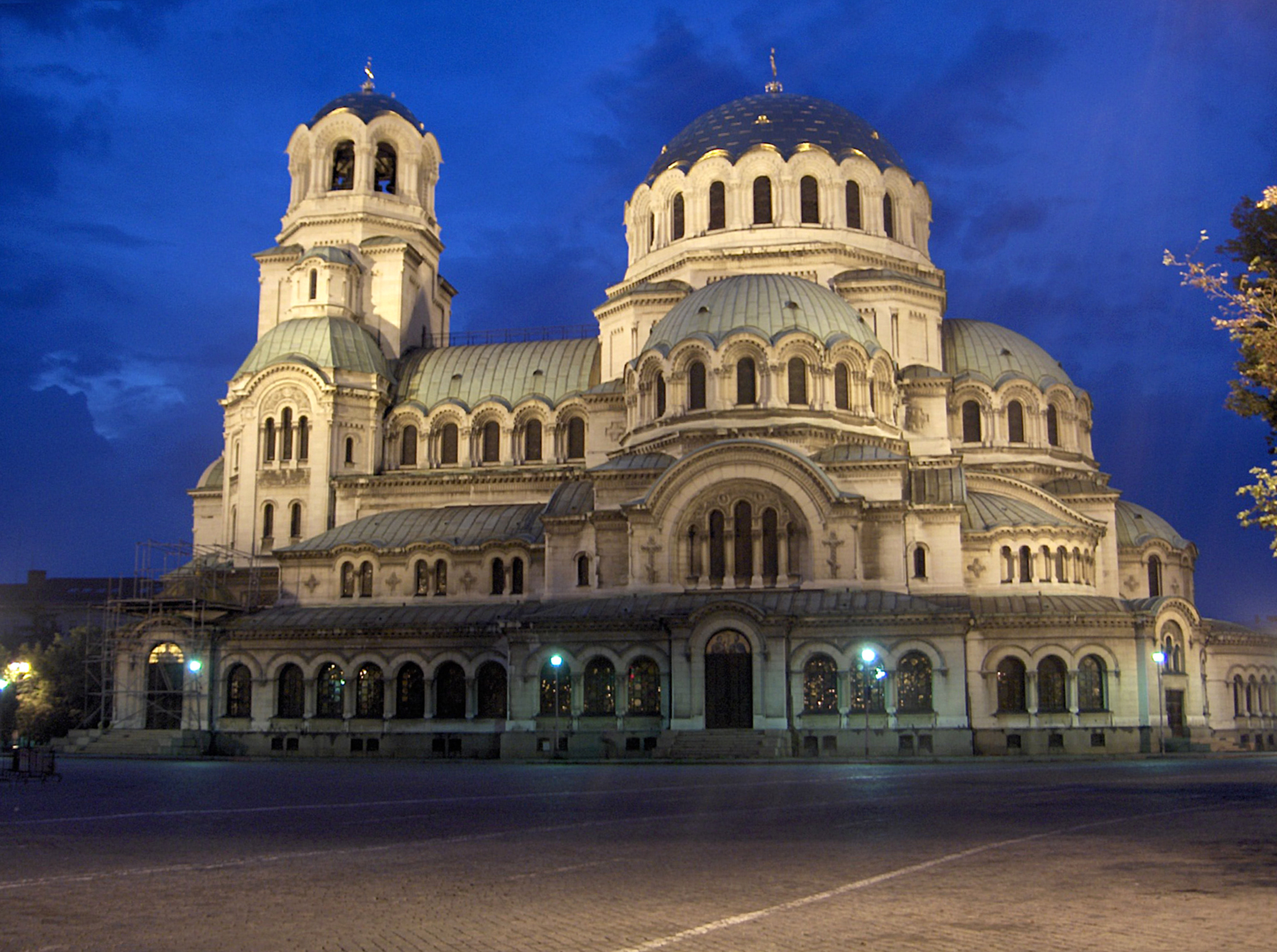
The cathedral at dawn

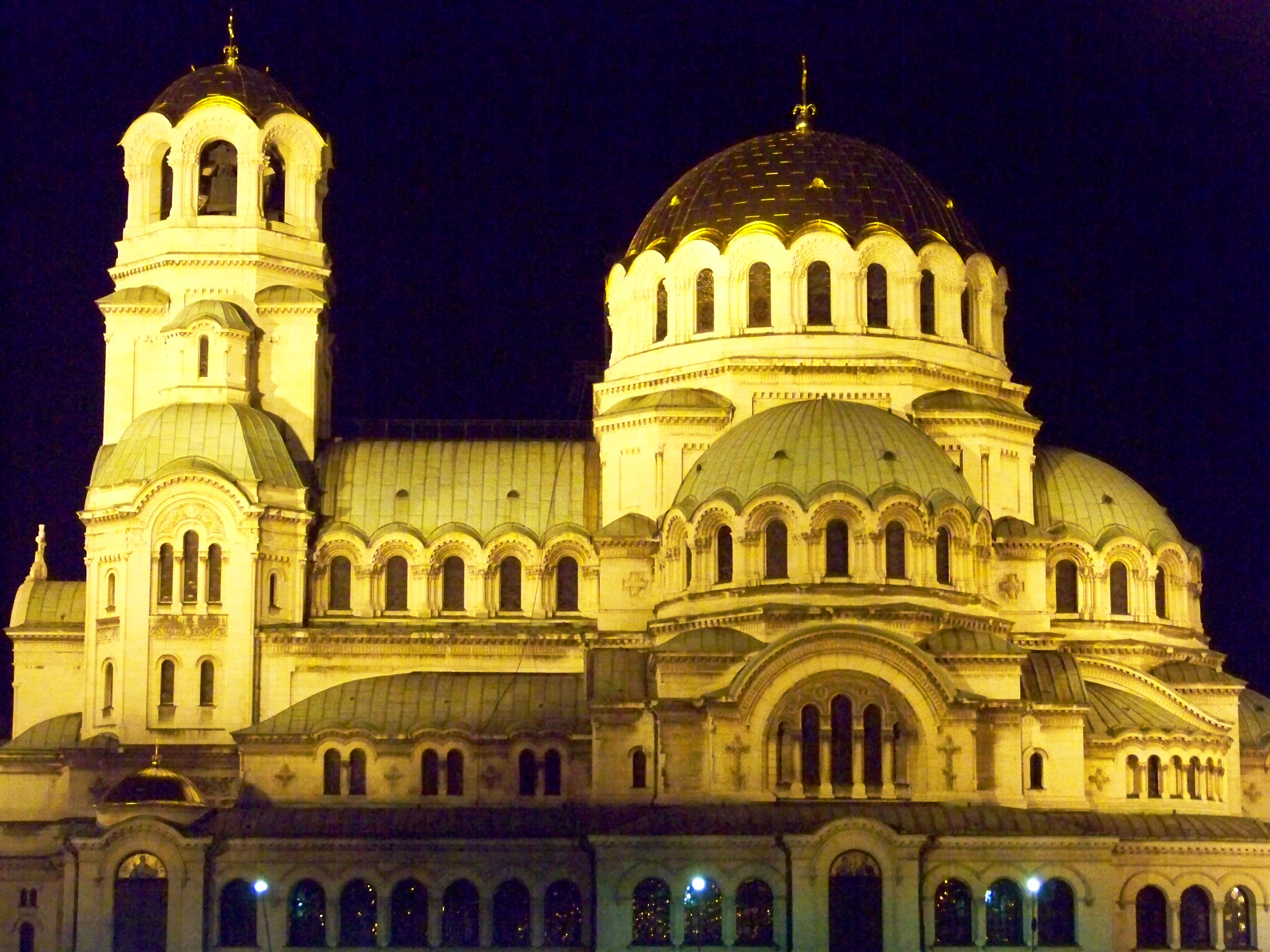
The cathedral at night

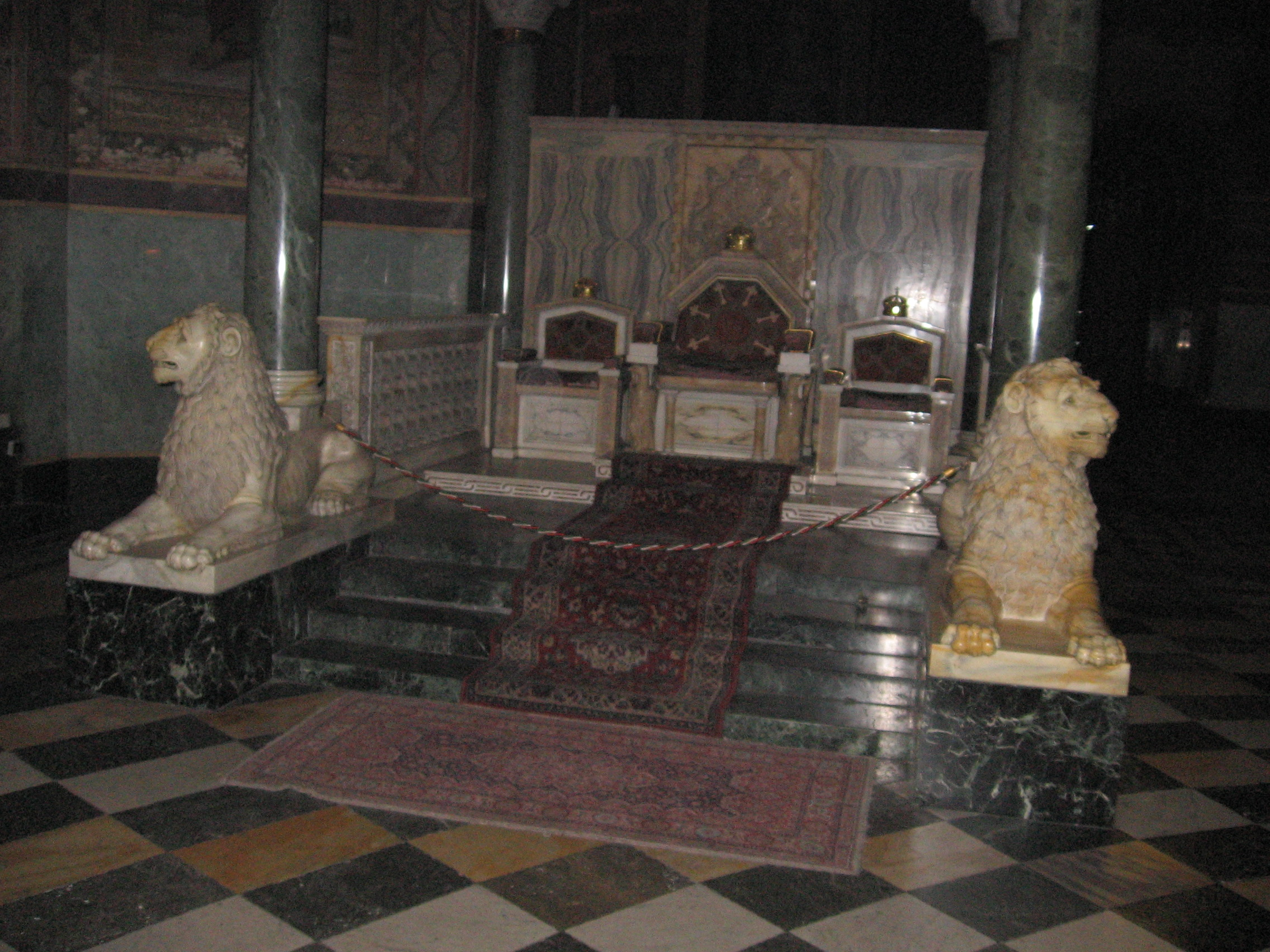
Inside the cathedral: the Royal thrones

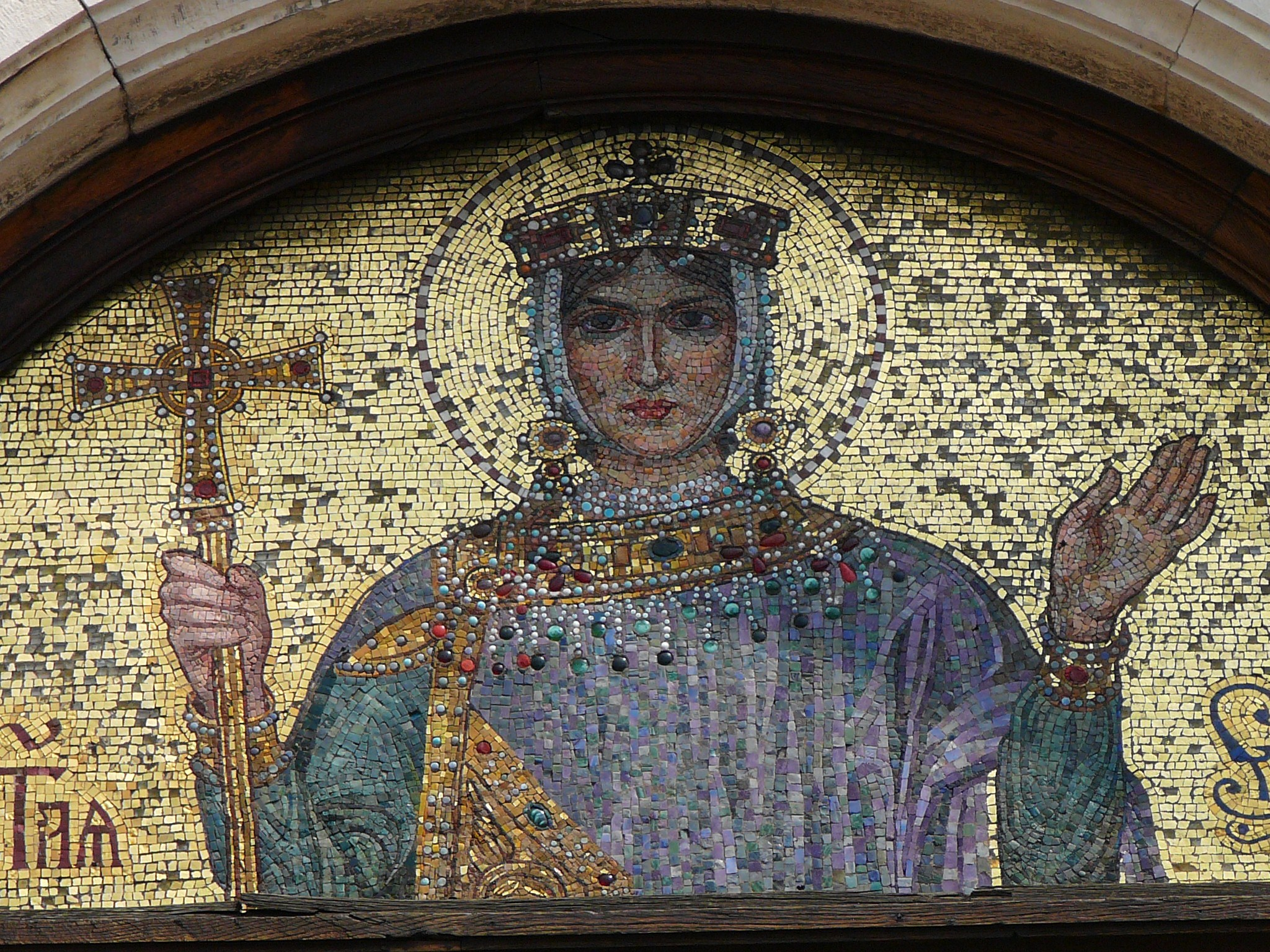
The outside of the cathedral is decorated with mosaics of various saints

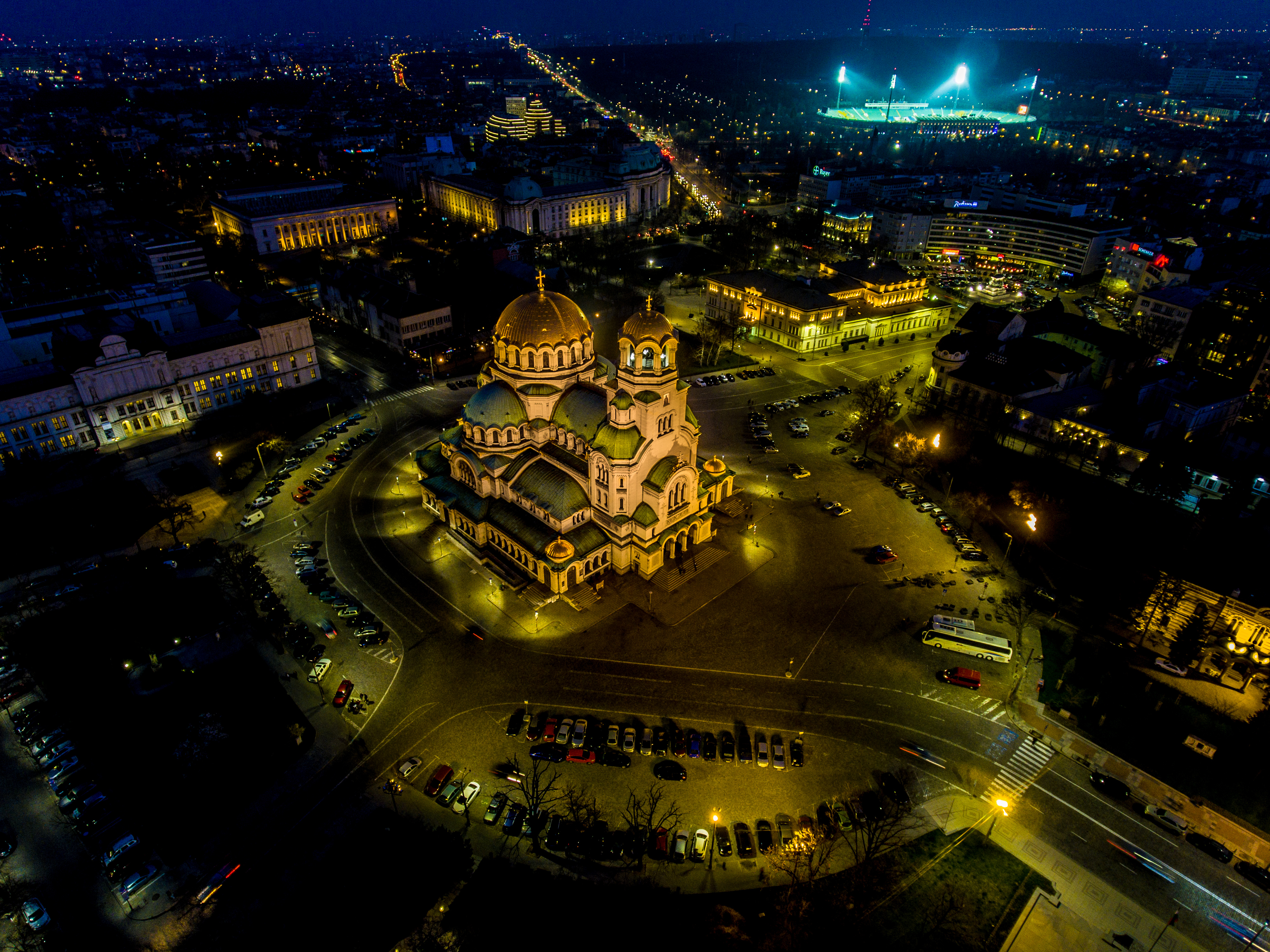

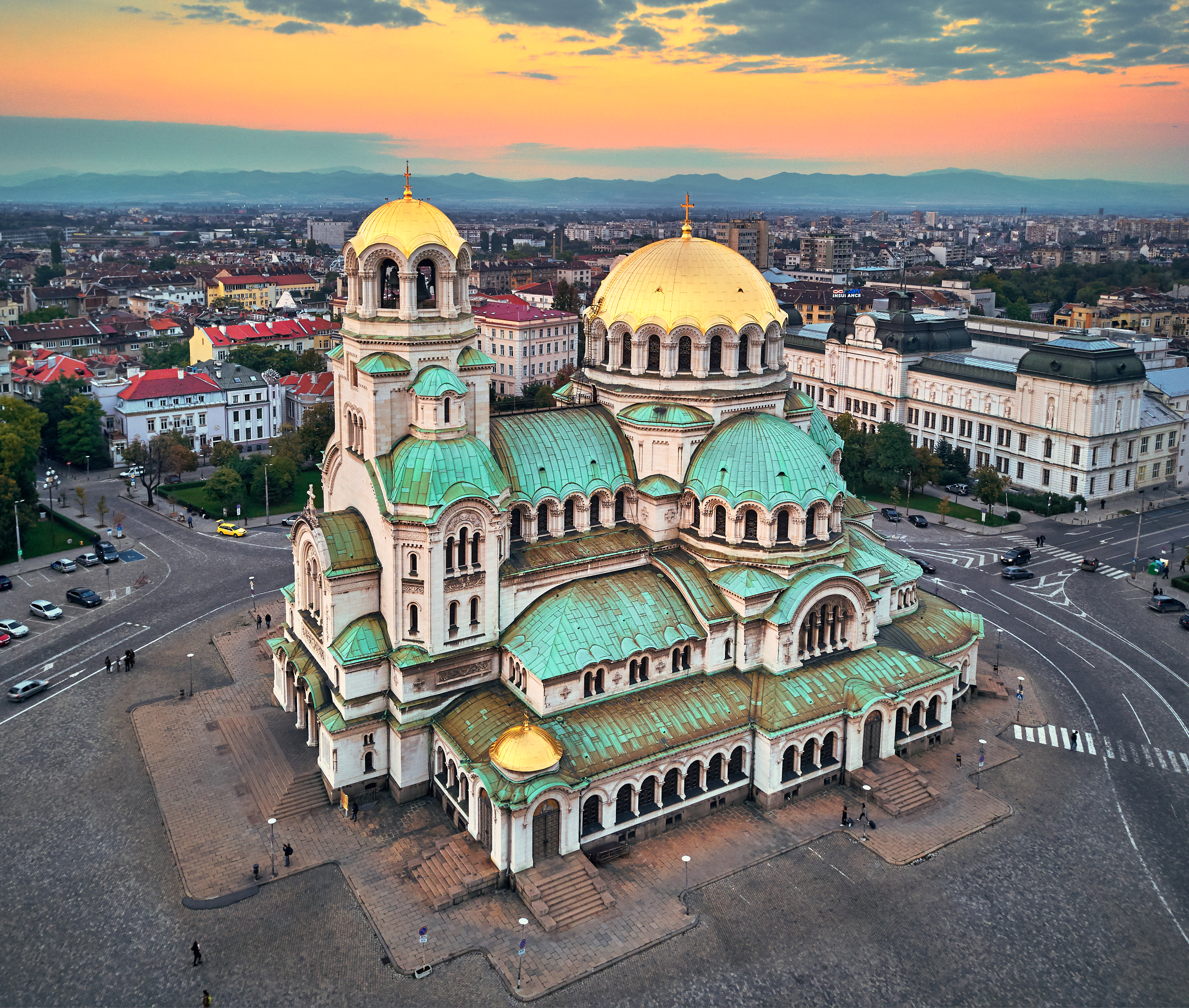

== See also ==
- List of churches in Sofia
- List of largest Eastern Orthodox church buildings
- List of tallest domes
