= FC Hebros =

Bulgarian football club

- Full name: Football Club Hebros 1921 Harmanli
- Nickname: The Daggers
- Founded: 1921; 105 years ago
- Ground: Hebros Stadium, Harmanli
- Capacity: 5,000
- Chairman: Belin Neshev
- Manager: Georgi Staikov
- League: A RFG Haskovo
- 2015–16: A RFG Haskovo, 1st
Home colours	Away colours

FC Hebros (Bulgarian: ФК Хеброс) is a Bulgarian football club based in Harmanli playing in the A RFG Haskovo, the fourth division of Bulgarian football. Its home stadium "Hebros" has a capacity of 5,000 seats. Its best achievement was participating in the Bulgarian "B" Professional Football Group. Club colors are green and white. FC Hebros was officially founded in 1921. Between 1982 and 1984 for the club had played famous Bulgarian forward Hristo Stoichkov (the European Footballer of the Year in 1994).

== Honors ==
- Bulgarian Cup - 1/8 Final: 1946, 1985
- 12 place in the National Championship in 1935
- 11th place in the South "B" Championship in 1956

== Current squad ==
Note: Flags indicate national team as defined under FIFA eligibility rules; some limited exceptions apply. Players may hold more than one non-FIFA nationality.

No. / Pos. / Nation / Player	No. / Pos. / Nation / Player

== Notable players ==
- (Bulgaria) Hristo Stoichkov
- (Bulgaria) Dimitar Marashliev
- (Bulgaria) Zhelyo Zhelev
- (Bulgaria) Georgi Karaneychev

== Past seasons ==
Season	League	Place	W	D	L	GF	GA	Pts	Bulgarian Cup
2014–15	A RFG Haskovo (IV)	2nd	17	1	4	62	15	52	not qualified
2015–16	A RFG Haskovo	1st	17	3	4	77	25	54	not qualified
2016–17	A RFG Haskovo	—	—	—	—	—	—	—	not qualified
Green marks a season followed by promotion, red a season followed by relegation.
