= Iliya Zhelev =

Bulgarian painter

Iliya Zhelev, also written as Илия Желев, born 1961 in Plovdiv, Bulgaria, is a famous Eastern European painter.

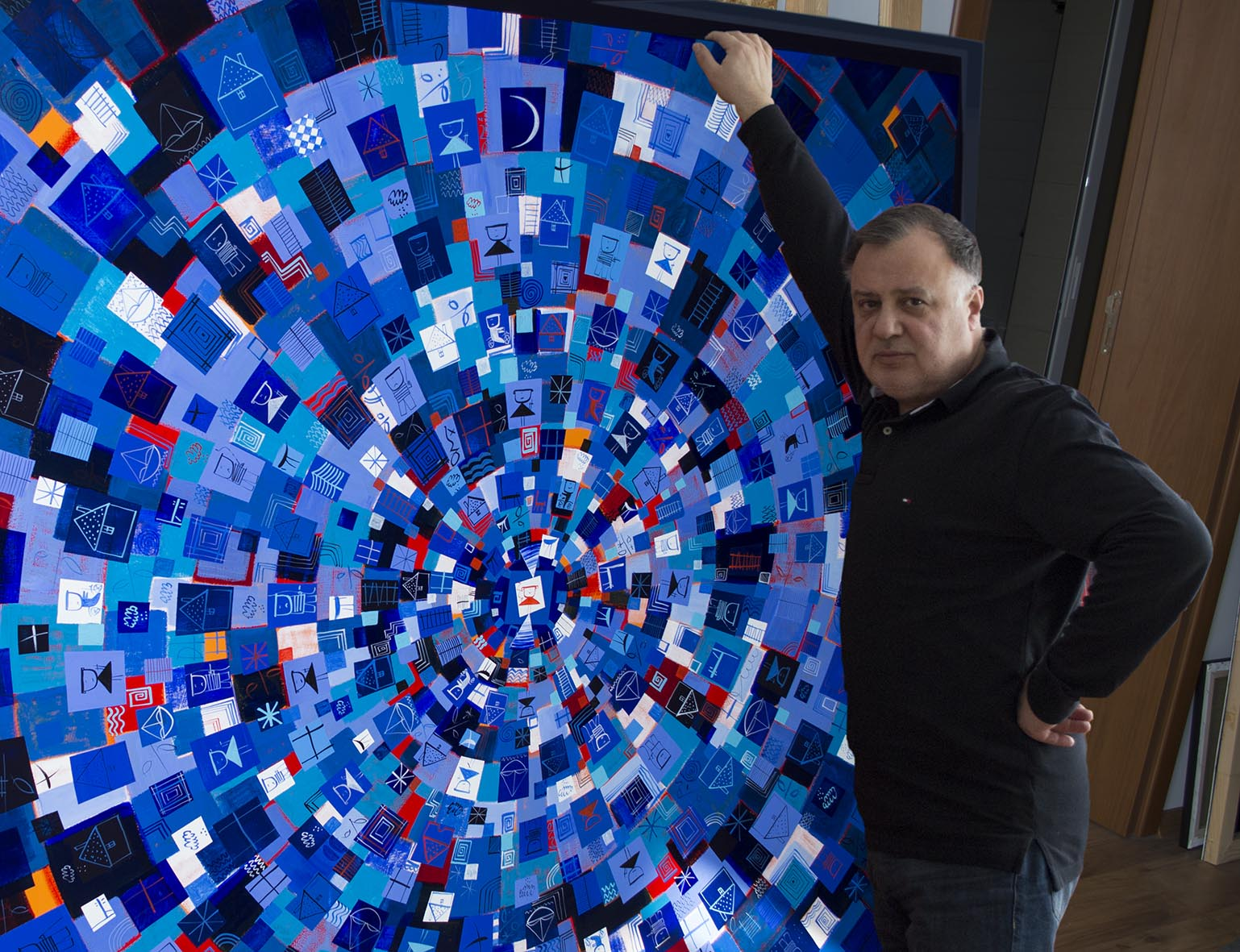

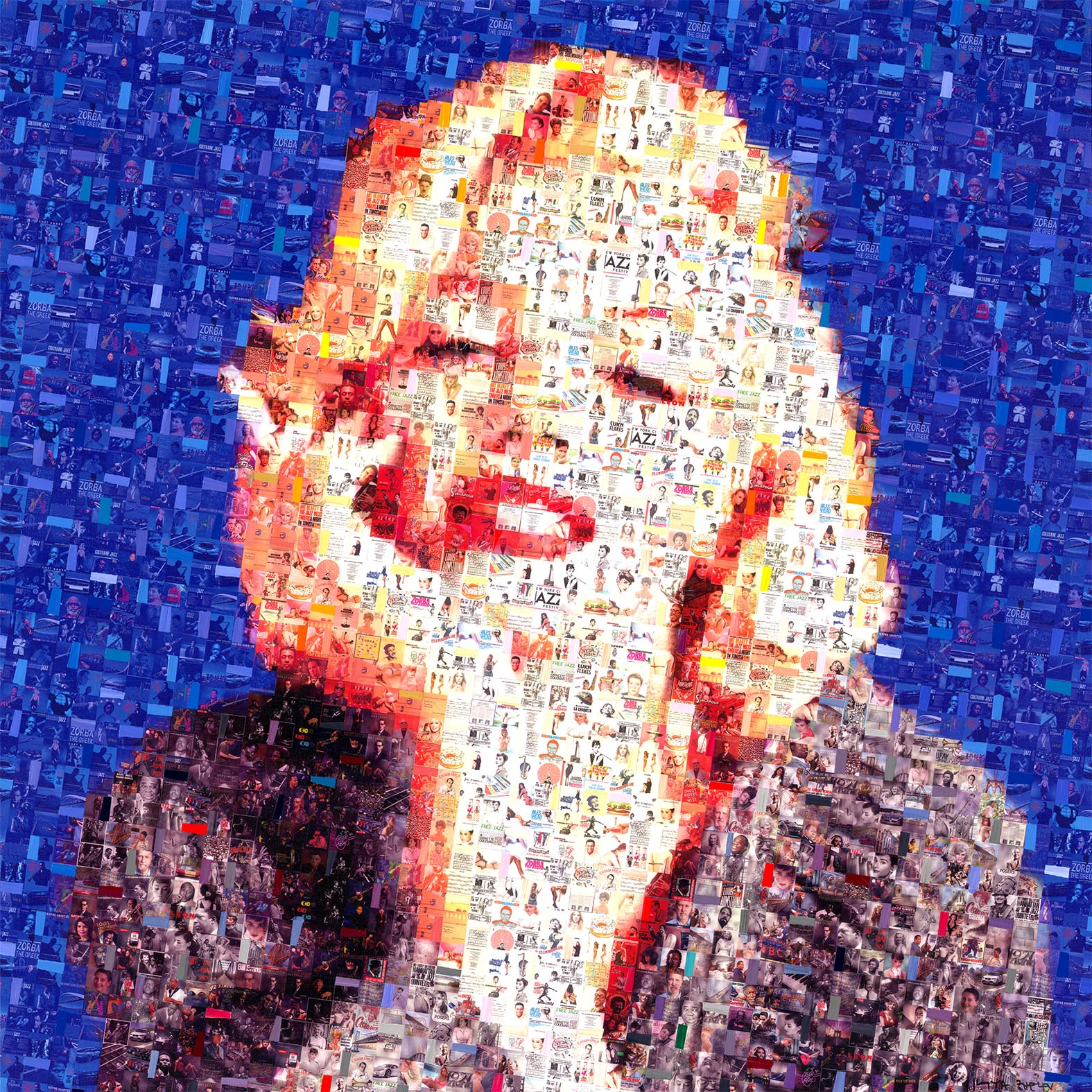

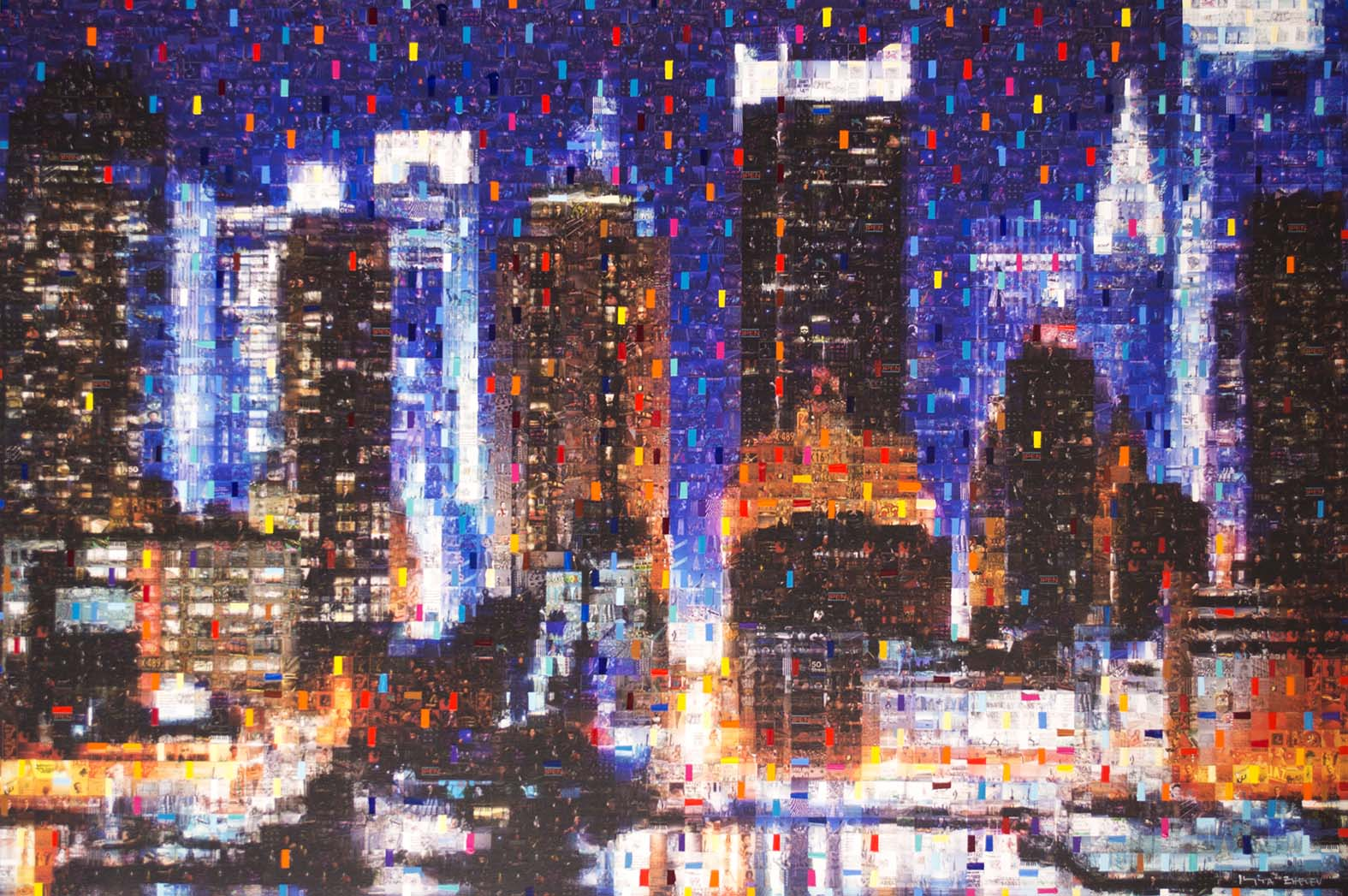

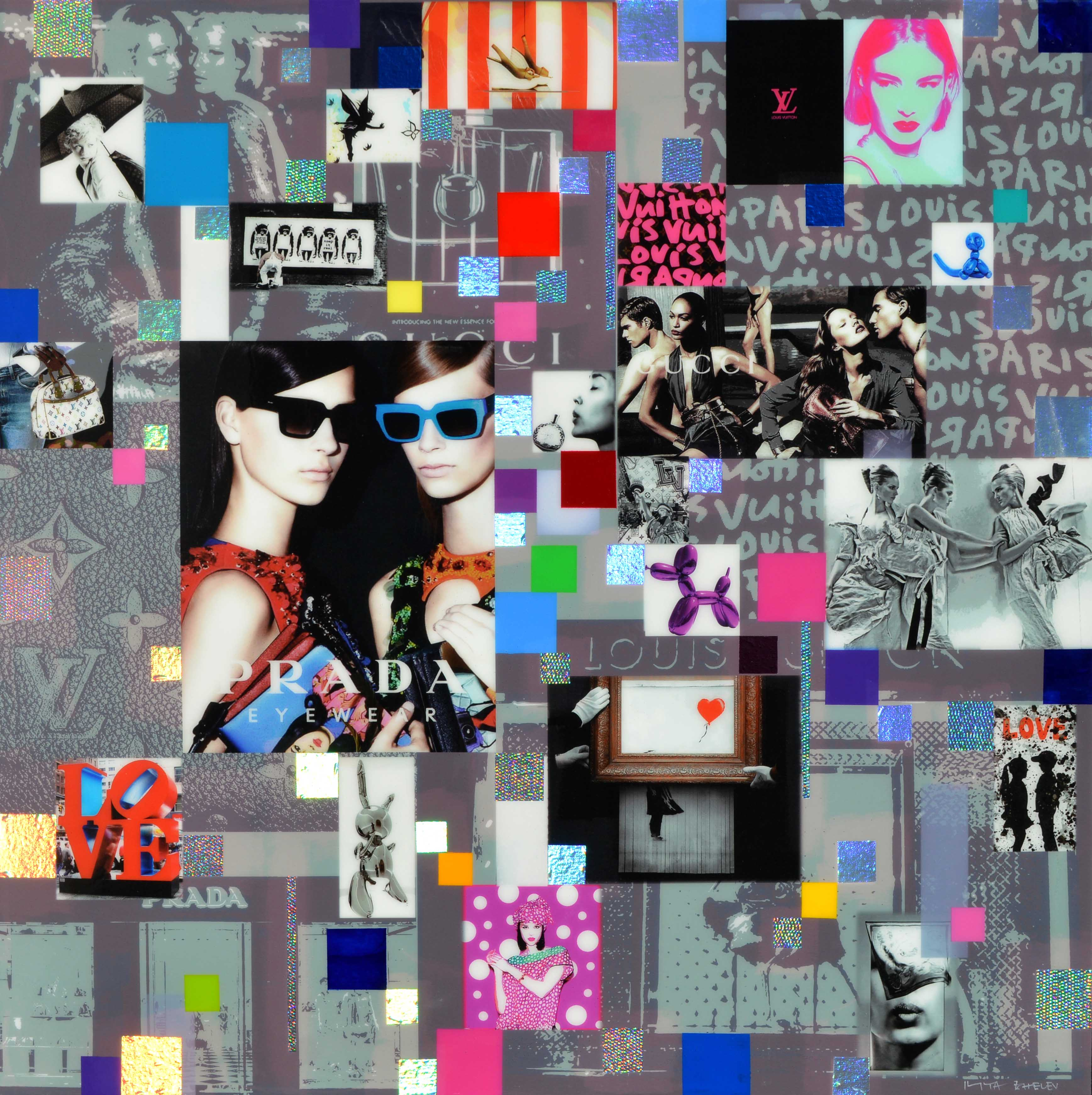

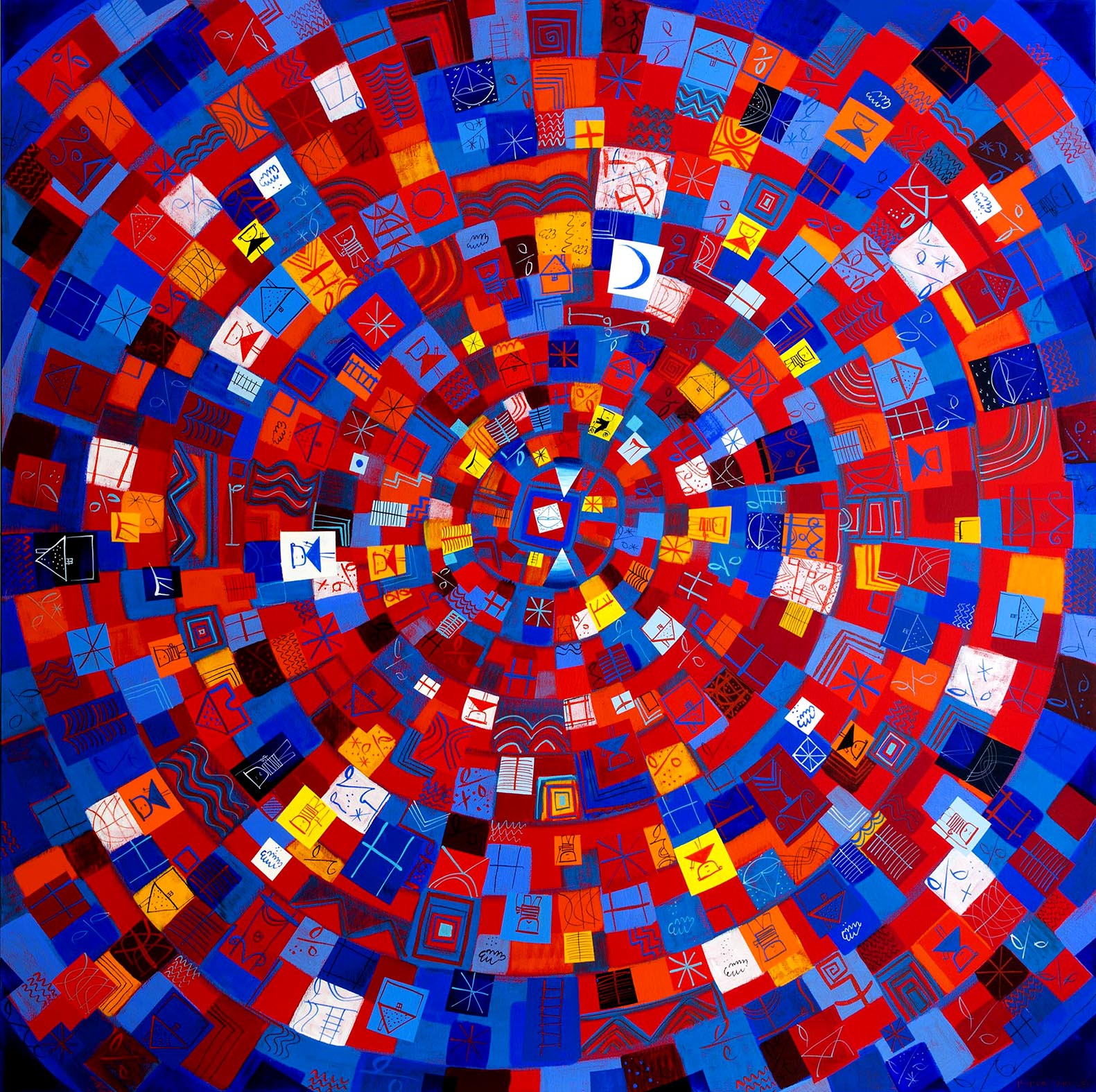

== Life ==
Iliya Zhelev, a European artist, was born in Plovdiv, Bulgaria in 1961. Throughout his career he has become iconic in his home country and well-known on an international level. His work has become popular in Germany through numerous successful solo exhibitions in galleries throughout the country. In 2005 EnBW, a large power supply company, sponsored an exhibition of his work. Zhelev's paintings are owned by the National Art Gallery Sofia, various private and state galleries and private collections in Germany, United States, Switzerland, Italy, Sweden United Arab Emirates, UK, Austria, Greece, France, the Netherlands, Luxembourg, Russia and Israel. Zhelev's influences include the artists Paul Klee, Wassily Kandinsky and Joan Miró. His paintings and collages are recognizable because of the unique style he employs. Zhelev fills his canvases with colorful and symbolically-rich squares in different formations, making his paintings stand out with their vibrancy and richness of expressiveness.

== Selected exhibitions ==
- 2020 Chagall and Zhelev, Mensing Gallery, Konstanz, Germany
- 2019 Mensing Gallery, Hamburg, Germany
- Galerie Meisterstück, Nurnberg, Germany
- Galerie Kunststücke, Munich, Germany
- 2018 Bilder König Gallery, Darmstadt, Germany
- 2017 Haus der Kunst Gallery, Andreas Lendl, Graz, Austria
- Mensing Gallery, Berlin, Germany
- Mensing Gallery, Hamburg, Germany
- Mensing Gallery, Hannover, Germany
- Cameo Kunsthandel Gallery, Heilbronn, Germany
- Cameo Kunsthandel Gallery, Mannheim, Germany
- 2016 Mensing Gallery, Konstanz, Germany
- Galerie Meisterstück, Nuremberg, Germany
- 2015 Mensing Gallery, Hannover, Germany
- Mensing Gallery, Hamm, Germany
- 2014 Haus der Kunst Gallery, Andreas Lendl, Graz, Austria
- Cameo Kunsthandel Gallery, Heilbronn, Germany
- Cameo Kunsthandel Gallery, Mannheim, Germany
- 2013 Mensing Gallery, Konstanz, Germany
- Mensing Gallery, Munich, Germany
- 2012 Chagall and Zhelev, Mensing Gallery, Hamburg
- Gallery Haus der Gemalde, Nurnberg, Germany
- Chagall and Zhelev, Mensing Gallery, Berlin
- Gallery Aspect, Plovdiv, Bulgaria
- Gallery Prat, Linz, Austria
- Haus der Gemälde, Nuremberg, Germany
- 2011 Mensing Gallery, Berlin, Germany
- Mensing Gallery, Dusseldorf, Germany
- Gallery Burger, Munich, Germany
- Von Poll Gallery, Gruenwald, Germany
- 2010 Anquin's Gallery, Reus, Barcelona, Spain
- Gallery Aspect, Plovdiv, Bulgaria
- 2009 Mensing Gallery, Baden-Baden, Germany
- Mensing Gallery, Hamburg, Germany
- Mensing Gallery, Dusseldorf, Germany
- Tuyap Art Fair, Istanbul, Turkey
- Mensing Gallery, Hannover, Germany
- Mensing Gallery, Berlin, Germany
- Mensing Gallery, Hamm-Rhynern, Germany
- 2008 Mensing Gallery, Hannover, Germany
- Mensing Gallery, Konstanz, Germany
- Mensing Gallery, Hamburg, Germany
- Valor Sanat Gallery, Ankara, Turkey
- Art International Zurich, Switzerland
- 2007 Valor Sanat Gallery, Ankara, Turkey
- Kersten Art Gallery, Brunnthal, Germany
- Gallery Burger, Munich, Germany
- Art Bodensee, Dornbirn, Austria
- Rapp Art Gallery, Wil, Switzerland
- Tuyap Art Fair, Istanbul, Turkey
- St’art 2006, Strasbourg, France
- 2006 Schortgen Gallery, Luxemburg
- Kuhn Gallery, Liliental, Germany
- Kuhn Gallery, Berlin, Germany
- Aspect Gallery, Plovdiv, Bulgaria
- Mensing Gallery, Hannover, Germany
- Mensing Gallery, Dusseldorf, Germany
- Mensing Gallery, Hamm-Rhynern, Germany
- St’art 2006, Strasbourg, France
- 2005 EnBW Gallery, Stuttgart, Germany
- Gallery Burger, Munich, Germany
- 2004 Schortgen Gallery, Luxemburg
- 2003 Gallery Prannerstrasse, Munich, Germany
- Milenio Gallery, Venice, Italia
- 2002 Art Fair Frankfurt, Germany
- 2001 Prannerstrasse, Munich, Germany
- 2000 Hirnickel Art Gallery, Bad Kissingen, Germany
- Art Fair Frankfurt, Germany
- 1999 Galerie in der Prannerstrasse, Munich, Germany
- 1998 Europ' Art, Astra Art Gallery, Geneva, Switzerland
- Rathaus, Brühl, Germany
- 1997 Galerie in der Prannerstrasse, Munich, Germany
- Kersten Art Gallery, Brunnthal, Germany
- 1996 Hirnickel Art Gallery, Bad Kissingen, Germany
- Cebit Hanover, Germany
- 1995 Galerie in der Prannerstrasse, Munich, Germany
- 1994 Art Fair Frankfurt, Germany
- 1993 Galerie in der Prannerstrasse, Munich, Germany
