= Zhelyo Zhelev =

Bulgarian footballer

Personal information
- Date of birth: 24 February 1987 (age 39)
- Place of birth: Stara Zagora, Bulgaria
- Height: 1.80 m (5 ft 11 in)
- Position: Midfielder

Team information
- Current team: Vereya Stara Zagora
- Number: 7

Senior career*
Years	Team	Apps	(Gls)
2005–2008	Beroe Stara Zagora	34	(1)
2008–2010	Lokomotiv StZ		
2010–	Vereya Stara Zagora		
- * Club domestic league appearances and goals as of 1 August 2008

Zhelyo Zhelev (born 24 February 1987 in Stara Zagora) is a Bulgarian footballer currently playing for Vereya Stara Zagora as a midfielder.
