= National Gallery for Foreign Art =

Bulgarian gallery located on St. Alexander Nevsky Square in Sofia

Coordinates: 42°41′46″N 23°20′4″E

- Национална галерия за чуждестранно изкуство
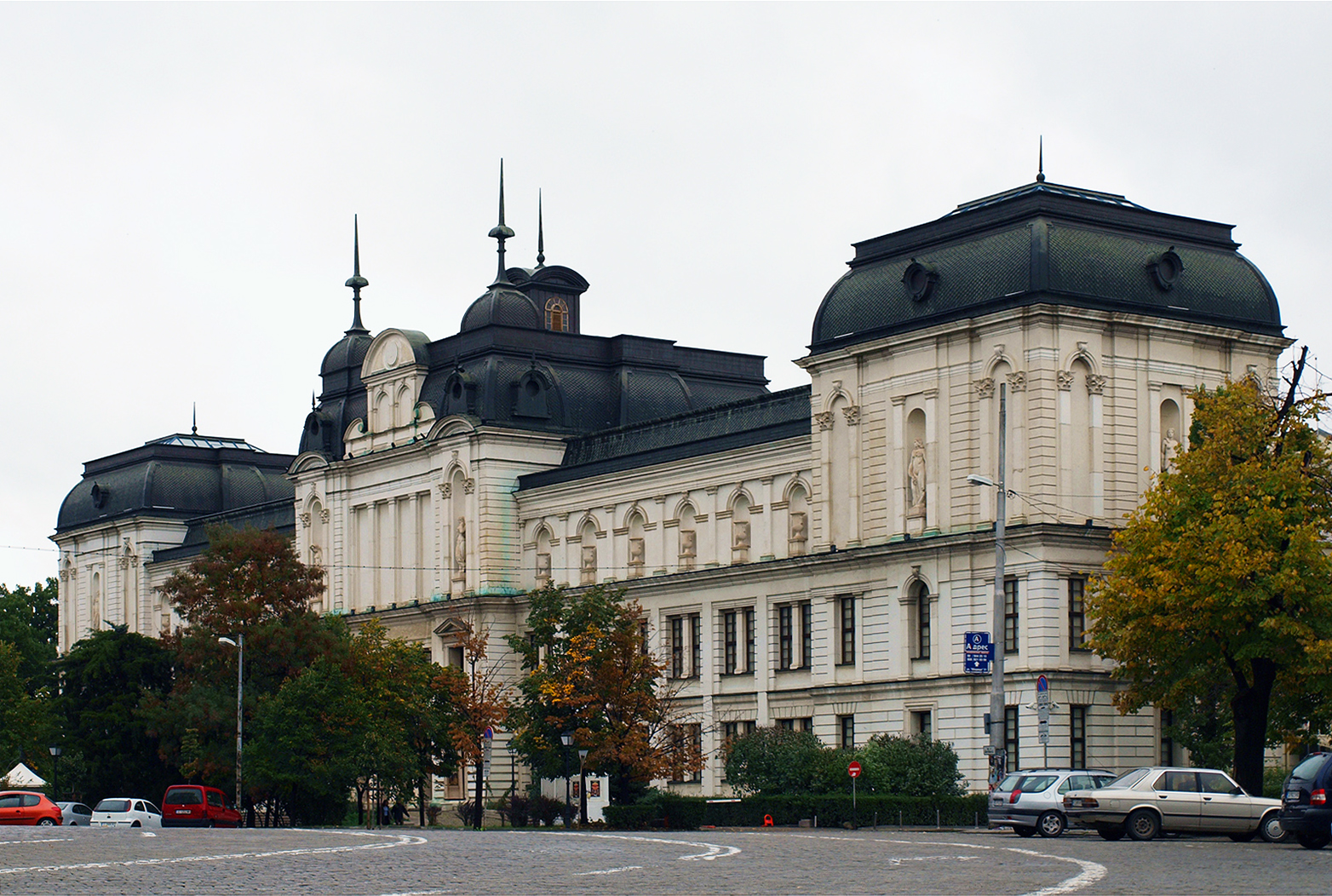
- National Gallery for Foreign Art building
- Established: 1985
- Location: Sofia, Bulgaria
- Collection size: 10,000 items
- Director: Slava Ivanova
- Website: http://www.nationalartgallerybg.org

The National Gallery for Foreign Art (Bulgarian: Национална галерия за чуждестранно изкуство, Natsionalna galeriya za chuzhdestranno izkustvo) of Bulgaria is a gallery located on St. Alexander Nevsky Square in Sofia. It serves as the country's national institution for non-Bulgarian art. It is situated in the 19th-century Neoclassic edifice of the former Royal Printing Office.

== History ==
The edifice of the NGFA was built between 1882 and 1884 during the rule of knyaz Alexander Battenberg to the designs of Austrian architect Friedrich Schwanberg and reconstructed after it suffered significant damage during the bombing of Sofia in World War II. The gallery itself was founded on 5 November 1985 as the art gallery of the Sts. Cyril and Methodius Foundation, its stock being later enlarged by donations, as well as by the addition of the National Art Gallery's foreign art section.

A large portion of the donations were made through the "13 Centuries of Bulgarian Statehood" fund, established by Lyudmila Zhivkova in the 1980s.

Since May 2015, collections of the National Gallery for Foreign Art are exhibited together with the 19th and 20th century collections of the National Art Gallery. For this purpose, the building on Alexander Nevsky Square was enlarged. The resulting exhibition space is known as National Gallery Square 500.

== Collections ==
The gallery's permanent exposition features European, Asian (Buddhist, Japanese and Indian) and African art, as well as separate contemporary art and engraving sections. Some of the works are in restoration, while others are in stock but not displayed due to the lack of space.

=== Indian Art ===
Halls One, Two and Three hold exhibitions of Indian art. Hall One is centered on Indian miniature. The collection includes works with traditional motives, paintings from the Mughal era and the Delhi Sultanate and the art schools of Rajasthan and Pahara. Hall Two contains religious sculptures from 320 to 550 AD. The figures represent Hindu gods like Vishnu, Ganesha, Brahma, Shiva and Krishna. Hall Three holds an exhibition of very rare 16th century sculptures of Christian saints from Goa, influenced by Indian tradition.

=== Japanese art ===
Hall Four holds a collection of various Japanese ukiyo-e prints, dating from the 18th century. It is the main artistic genre of woodblock printing in Japan. Usually the word ukiyo is literally translated as "floating world" in English, referring to a conception of an evanescent world, impermanent, fleeting beauty and a realm of entertainments (kabuki, courtesans, geisha) divorced from the responsibilities of the mundane, everyday world; "pictures of the floating world", i.e. ukiyo-e, are considered a genre unto themselves. The collection offers an insight into the development of ukiyo-e from monochrome to polychrome prints, as well as the first contacts of Japanese and European art. Some of the artists included are Hokusai, Hiroshige, Kikukawa Eizan and Utamaro.

=== African art ===
The African art collection in Hall Five is composed mainly of sculptures with a religious cult function. Masks are also present. Many of the items belong to local cultures of Benin and Ghana, and some Dogon statues and masks are also presented.

=== Buddhist art from Southeast Asia ===
Hall Six exhibits Buddhist art from the region of Southeast Asia, primarily from the Pagan Kingdom and other areas of what is today Myanmar. Sculptures of the Buddha in the different positions and from various materials, as well as manuscripts and other fine and applied arts, date as early as the 11th century AD. This collection was donated to the Gallery in 1987.

=== European fine arts ===
Halls Seven, Eight and Nine display a rich collection of European fine arts from the 15th to the 20th century. Hall Seven is concentrated mostly around Renaissance art, along with smaller collections of Dutch Golden Age painting. The oldest work in the exhibition, The Baptism of Christ by Andrea del Verrocchio, dates from the late 15th century. Other Italian artists include Pietro Perugino, Antonio da Correggio, Rosso Fiorentino, Giovanni Battista Moroni and Alessandro Magnasco. Dutch painting is represented by Jan van Goyen, Nicolaes Pieterszoon Berchem, Isaac van Ostade and Frans Francken II. Hall Eight encompasses French, Flemish and other art from the 18th to the first half of the 19th century, most notably works by Jean-Baptiste Greuze, Francisco Goya and Jan Frans van Bredael. Hall Nine exhibits painting and sculpture from the second half of the 19th and the 20th century by Auguste Rodin, Ivan Meštrović, Pierre-Auguste Renoir, Marc Chagall, Pablo Picasso, Joan Miró and Salvador Dalí, among others. Hall Ten holds a rare display of paintings by Les Nabis, a group of Post-Impressionist avant-garde artists who set the pace for fine arts and graphic arts in France in the 1890s.

=== Other ===
Halls 11 to 19 hold various expositions, including a Salon d'Automne (Hall 18), a collection of Parisian-themed and authored works of the early 20th century, modern Spanish art, a display dedicated to Nicholas Roerich, as well as the Nova Hall where temporary exhibitions are held.

== Accessibility ==
The NGFA is situated in the very centre of Sofia, at St. Alexander Nevsky Square, behind the building of the National Assembly and the Alexander Nevsky Cathedral. Entrance fees are 6 leva for adults and 3 leva for students. The Gallery is closed on Tuesdays and has free entrance every last Monday of the month. Its working hours are 11–18.30h.

Service	Station/Stop	Lines/Routes served	Distance from NGFA
Sofia Trolleybus Service	Vasil Levski Monument	11	100 m
Sofia Metro	Sofia University	1	350 m

== Gallery ==
Exhibitions
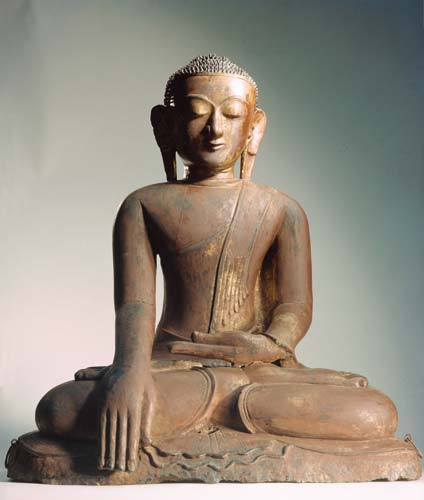
Statue of the Buddha from the Pagan Kingdom

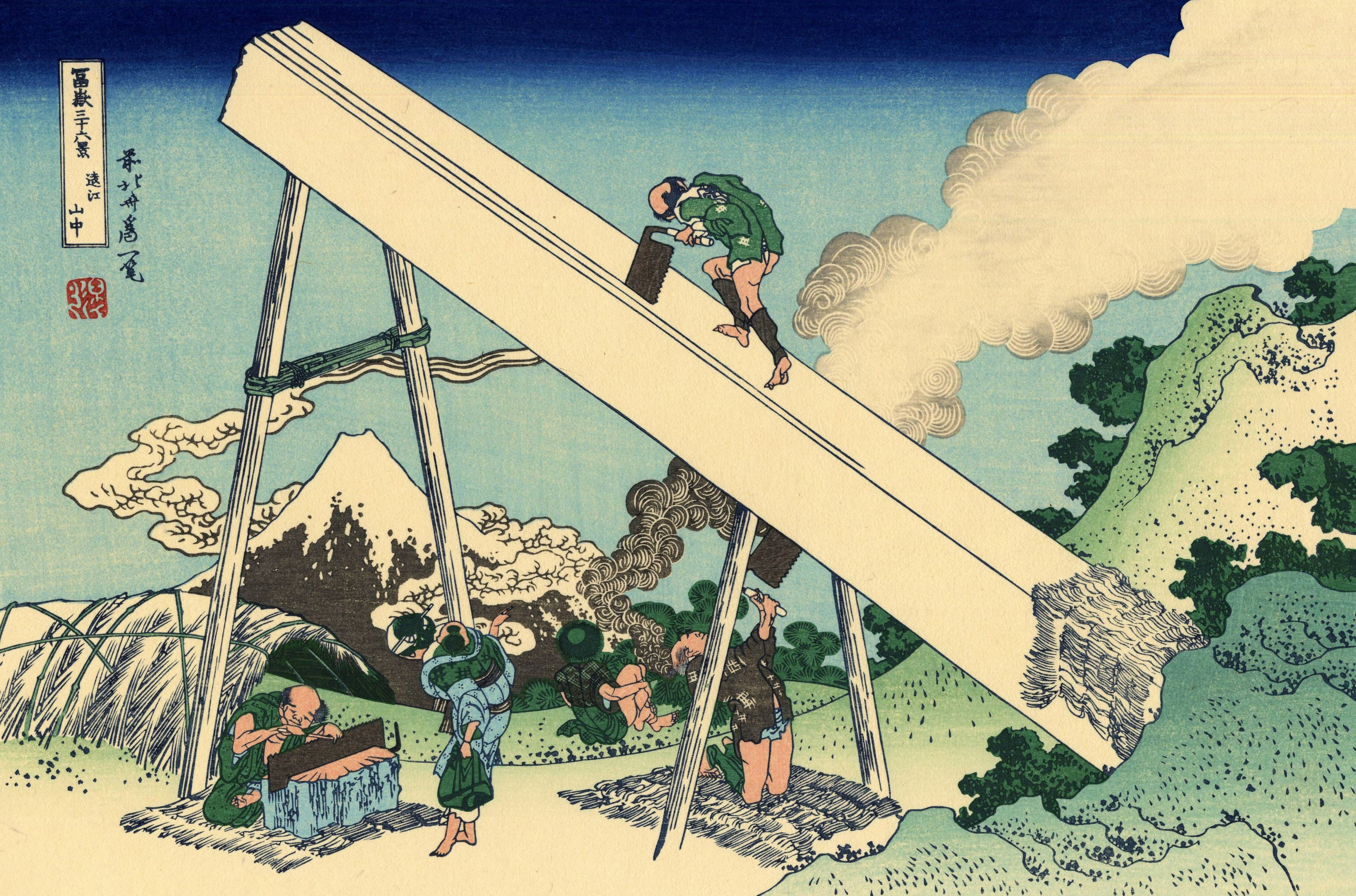
In the Mountains of Totomi by Hokusai

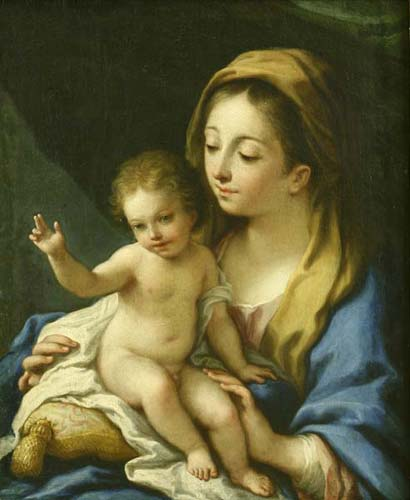
Madonna and Child by Antonio da Correggio
