= National Art Gallery, Bulgaria =

Art museum in Sofia, Bulgaria

National Art Gallery
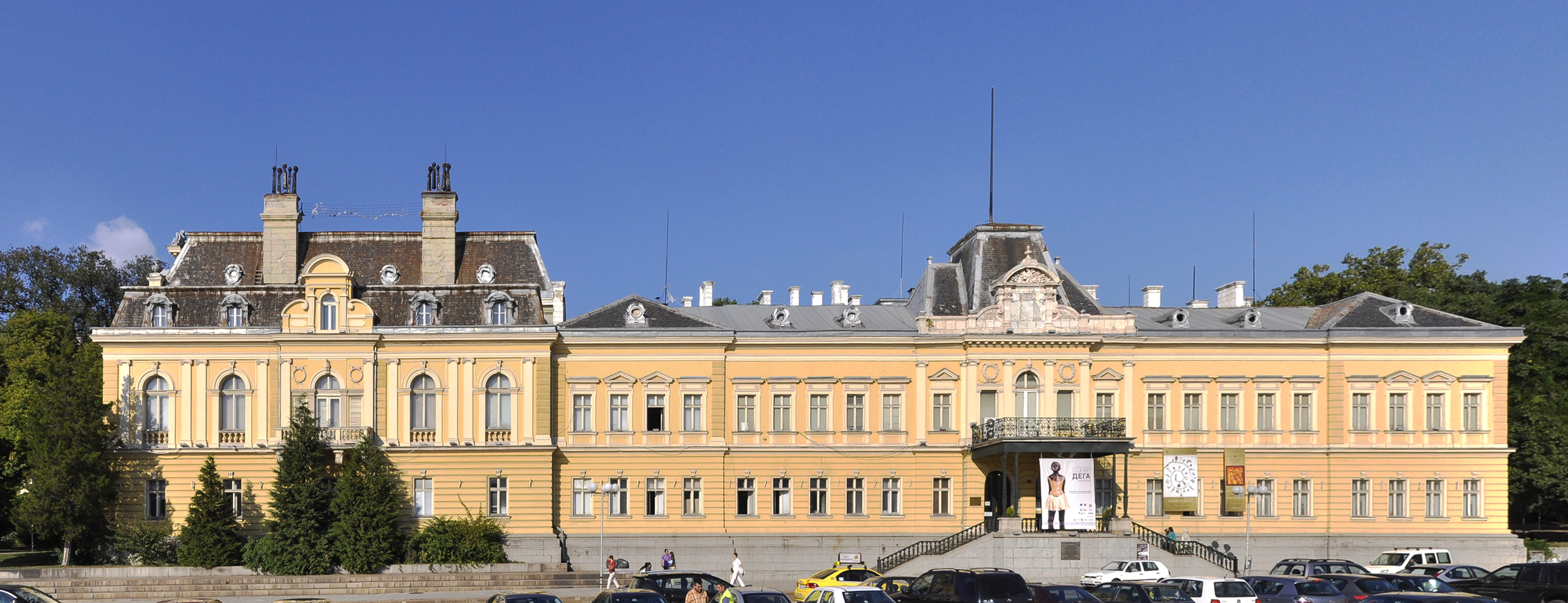
- The National Art Gallery edifice, the former royal palace of Bulgaria
- Interactive fullscreen map
- Location: Sofia, Bulgaria
- Coordinates: 42°41′47″N 23°19′36″E

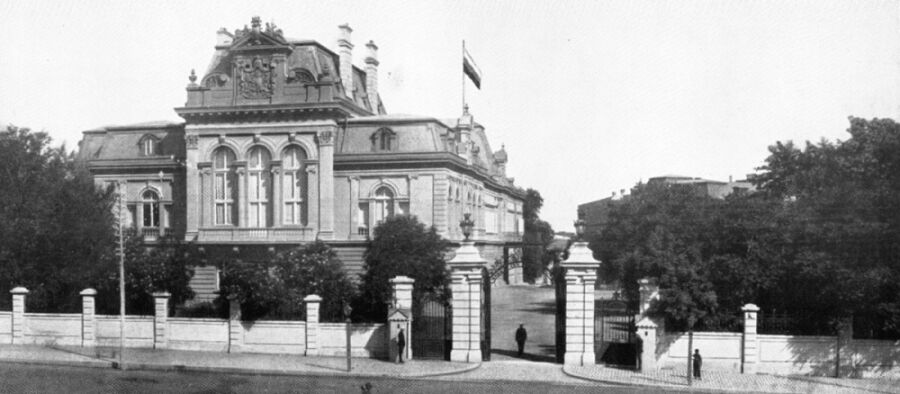
The former royal palace in 1917.

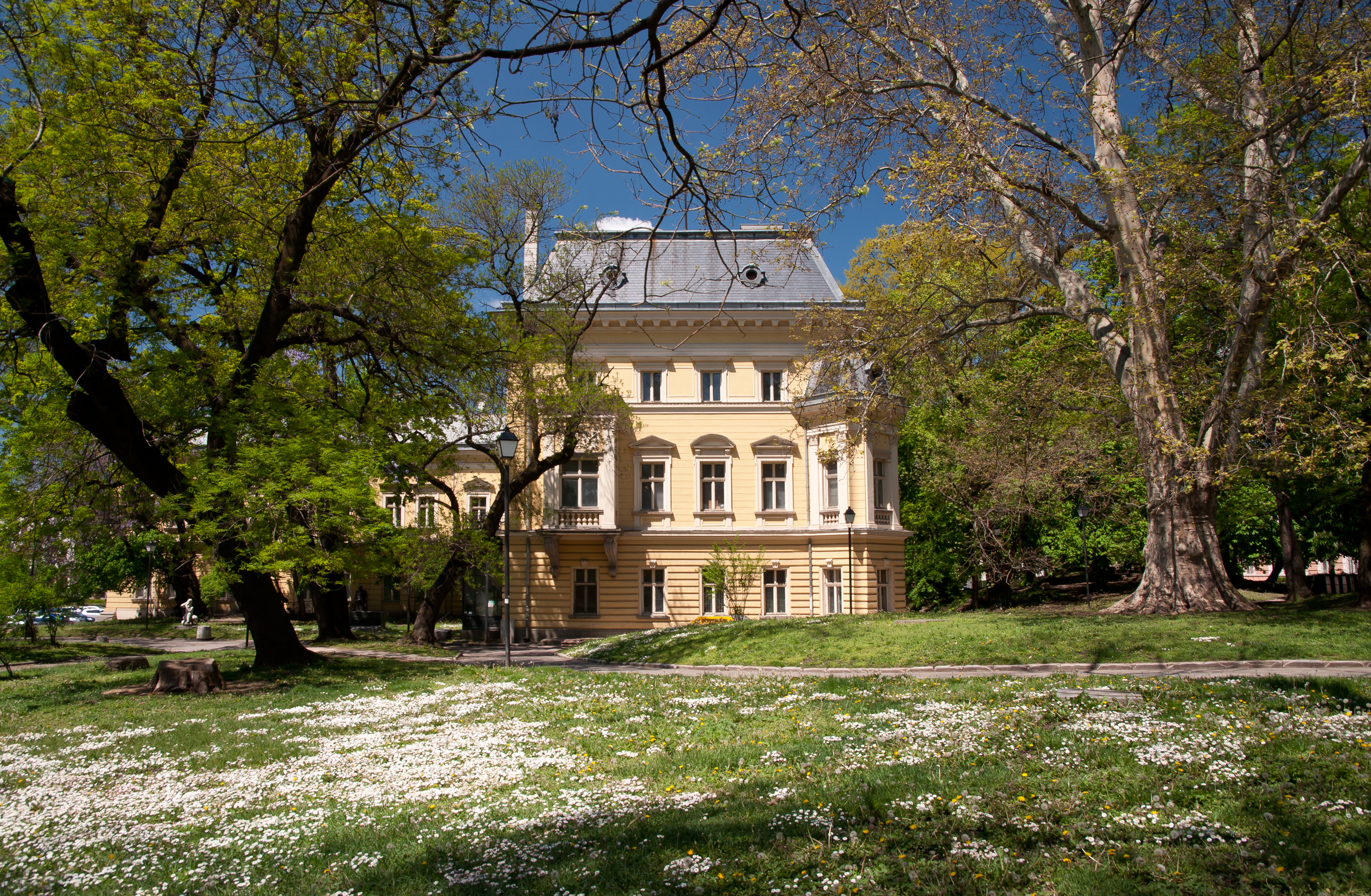
A view from the royal garden

The National Art Gallery (Bulgarian: Национална художествена галерия, Natsionalna hudozhestvena galeriya) is Bulgaria's national gallery, and houses over 50,000 pieces of Bulgarian art.

== History ==
It is located on Battenberg Square in the capital city of Sofia, occupying most of the historic Ottoman Chelebi mosque and Ottoman konak, which were converted into the imposing edifice of the former royal palace of Bulgaria.

=== Royal Palace ===
The royal palace, a typical example of Second Empire architecture with chateauesque connotations, was constructed in two stages, the first lasting between 1880 and 1882 during the rule of Knyaz Alexander Battenberg, when Austro-Hungarian architects under Viktor Rumpelmayer worked on the building. It was inaugurated on 26 December 1882 and constituted the representative part of the palace, encompassing the administrative ground floor, the ballrooms above and the service third floor. The second stage, during Knyaz (later Tsar) Ferdinand, saw the construction of the palace's east wing by Viennese architect Friedrich Grünanger, who incorporated elements of Viennese Neo-Baroque. The east wing was where the apartments of the royal family were located, but some service premises (including a lift) were also located there.

After the abolition of the monarchy and the establishment of a Communist government in Bulgaria following World War II, most of the palace was given to the National Art Gallery since its building was destroyed by the bombing raids in 1943 and 1944. All of the paintings it had housed were preserved, and together with the royal art collection already exhibited in the palace formed the stock of the National Art Gallery.

== National Art Gallery ==
The gallery was established in 1934 and moved to the palace in 1946, after the abolition of the monarchy. The National Art Gallery is situated at an altitude of 556 m.

The National Art Gallery had been planned for many years and between 1934 and 1941, Bulgaria's first female architect Victoria Angelova's design was built to house both a renaissance and contemporary art collection. The building was finished and opened in 1942, but was completely destroyed in a 1944 bombing.

Meanwhile, the National Archaeological Museum was established. It was the first national institution to have an art department in the country, which was founded in 1892. It collected examples of contemporary Bulgarian art. The department grew into the State Art Gallery in 1934 and was moved to a separate building. Among its exhibits were works by Bulgarian National Revival artists, foreign art and works of first-generation Bulgarian painters from after the Liberation of Bulgaria in 1878.

The medieval art department was formed in 1965 and occupies the crypt of the Alexander Nevsky Cathedral. In 1985 the foreign art section became independent as the National Gallery for Foreign Art and was moved to the former Royal Printing Office, an imposing Neoclassical building in Sofia.

The National Art Gallery houses not only examples of contemporary and National Revival art, but also the country's largest collection of medieval paintings, including more than four thousand icons, a collection comparable in quality and number only to that of the Benaki Museum according to the director of the gallery, Boris Danailov.

Since May 2015, the 19th and 20th century collections of the National Art Gallery are exhibited together with the collections of the National Gallery for Foreign Art. For this purpose, the building of the National Gallery for Foreign Art on Alexander Nevsky Square was enlarged. The resulting exhibition space is known as National Gallery Square 500.

== See also ==
- List of national galleries
