= Ovcha kupel Metro Station =

Sofia metro station

Ovcha kupel Овча купел
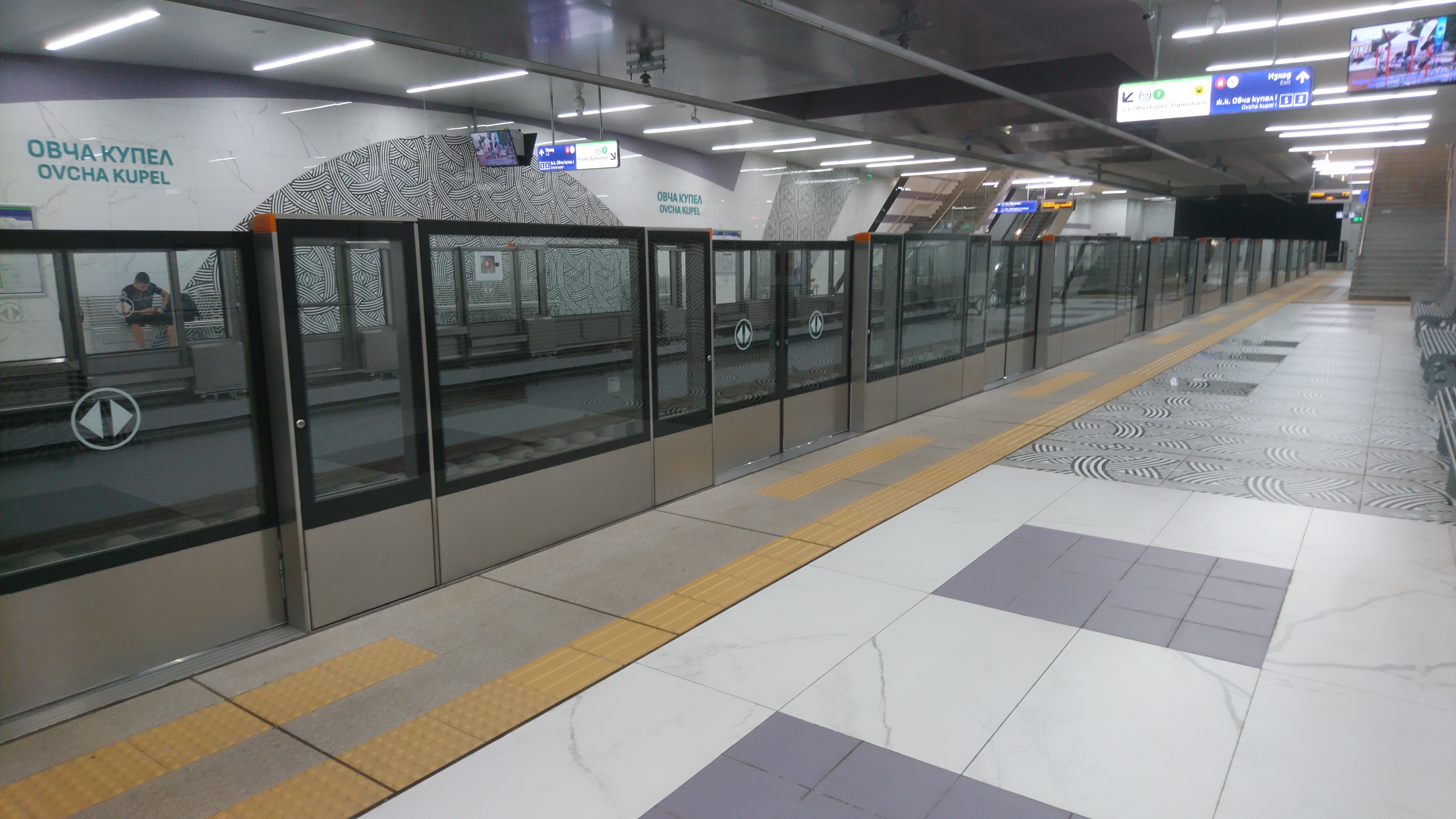

General information
- Location: 1618 Ovcha Kupel 1, Sofia
- Coordinates: 42°40′58″N 23°16′14″E
- Owner: Sofia Municipality
- Operator: Metropoliten JSC
- Platforms: side
- Tracks: 2
- Bus routes: 2
- Connections
- Tram: 11
- Bus: 11, 60

Construction
- Structure type: sub-surface
- Platform levels: 2
- Parking: no
- Cycle facilities: no
- Accessible: elevators

Other information
- Status: Staffed
- Station code: 3329; 3330
- Website: Official website

History
- Opened: 24 April 2021

Services
Preceding station	Sofia Metro	Following station
Moesia towards Gorna Banya	M3 line	Tsar Boris III towards General Vladimir Vazov
Location

Ovcha kupel (Bulgarian: Метростанция "Овча купел") is a Sofia Metro station on the M3 line. It was opened on 24 April 2021 as part of the second section of the line, from Ovcha kupel to Gorna Banya. The preceding station is Moesia and the adjacent station is Tsar Boris III.

== Location ==
The station is located near the intersection of President Lincoln blvd. and Nikola Mushanov blvd. The station has a total of 5 exits - 4 on President Lincoln blvd (2 east ones and 2 west ones, one on each side of the boulevard), and the 5th exit is across the intersection, on the east side of Nikola Mushanov blvd.

== Interchange with other public transport ==
- Tramway service: 11
- City Bus service: 11, 60
