= Moesia Metro Station =

Metro station of Sofia, Bulgaria

Moesia Мизия

General information
- Other names: New Bulgarian University
- Location: 1632 Ovcha Kupel 1, Sofia
- Coordinates: 42°41′2″N 23°15′25″E
- Owner: Sofia Municipality
- Operator: Metropoliten JSC
- Platforms: side
- Tracks: 2
- Bus routes: 3
- Connections
- Bus: 59, 60, 73

Construction
- Structure type: sub-surface
- Platform levels: 2
- Parking: yes
- Cycle facilities: no
- Accessible: elevators

Other information
- Status: Staffed
- Station code: 3331; 3332
- Website: Official website

History
- Opened: 24 April 2021

Services
Preceding station	Sofia Metro	Following station
Ovcha Kupel II towards Gorna Banya	M3 line	Ovcha kupel towards General Vladimir Vazov
Location

Moesia (Bulgarian: Метростанция "Мизия") is a Sofia Metro station on the M3 line. It was opened on 24 April 2021 as part of the second section of the line, from Ovcha kupel to Gorna Banya. The preceding station is Ovcha kupel II and the adjacent station is Ovcha kupel.

== Location ==
The station's two east entrances are located on the Montevideo blvd. in the Ovcha kupel 1 microdistrict, while the two west entrances are on the station's own buffer parking, near the 88th middle school.

== Interchange with other public transport ==
- City Bus service: 60, 73
- Suburban Bus service: 59
