= Ovcha Kupel II Metro Station =

Railway station in Sofia, Bulgaria

Ovcha Kupel II Овча купел II
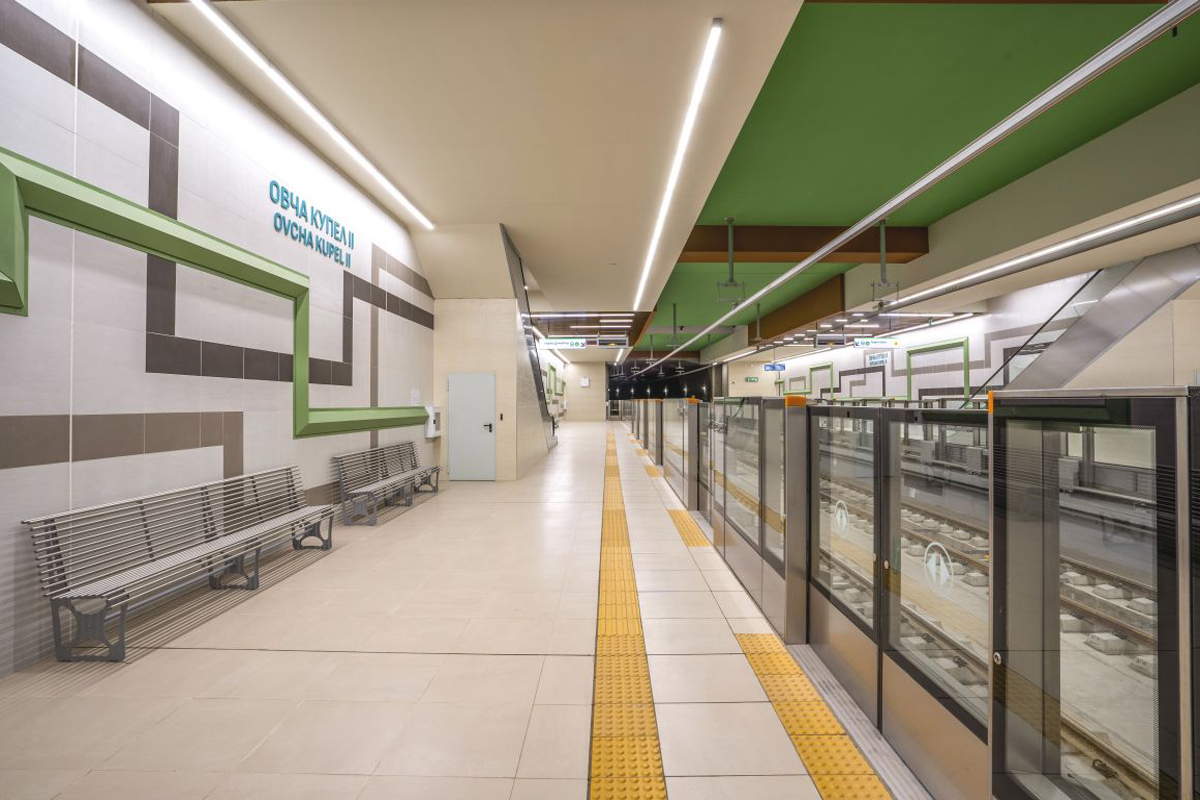

General information
- Location: 1632 Ovcha Kupel 2, Sofia
- Coordinates: 42°41′4″N 23°14′52″E
- Owner: Sofia Municipality
- Operator: Metropoliten JSC
- Platforms: side
- Tracks: 2
- Bus routes: none

Construction
- Structure type: sub-surface
- Platform levels: 2
- Parking: yes
- Cycle facilities: no
- Accessible: elevators

Other information
- Status: Staffed
- Station code: 3333; 3334
- Website: Official website

History
- Opened: 24 April 2021

Services
Preceding station	Sofia Metro	Following station
Gorna Banya Terminus	M3 line	Moesia towards General Vladimir Vazov
Location

Ovcha Kupel II (Bulgarian: Метростанция "Овча купел II") is a Sofia Metro station on the M3 line. It was opened on 24 April 2021 as part of the second section of the line between Ovcha kupel and Gorna Banya. The preceding station is Gorna Banya and the adjacent station is Moesia.

== Location ==
The station's is located at the intersection of Centralna street with Zhyul Losho street, nearby Doverie Hospital. The station has two exits, one on each side of Centralna street
