= Medical University Metro Station =

Sofia metro station

Medical University Медицински университет

General information
- Location: 1431 Sofia center, Sofia
- Coordinates: 42°41′11.2″N 23°18′32.3″E
- Owner: Sofia Municipality
- Operator: Metropoliten JSC
- Platforms: side
- Tracks: 2
- Bus routes: 4
- Connections
- Trolleybus: 2, 8, 9
- Bus: 72, 260, 604, N4

Construction
- Structure type: sub-surface
- Platform levels: 2
- Parking: no
- Cycle facilities: yes
- Accessible: yes
- Architect: Irena Derlipanska

Other information
- Status: Staffed
- Station code: 3321; 3322
- Website: Official website

History
- Opened: 26 August 2020

Services
Preceding station	Sofia Metro	Following station
Bulgaria towards Gorna Banya	M3 line	NDK II towards General Vladimir Vazov
Location

Medical University (Bulgarian: Медицински университет) is a Sofia Metro station on M3 line. It was opened on 26 August 2020 as part of the inaugural section of the line, from Hadzhi Dimitar to Krasno Selo; Krasno Selo was later renamed Tsar Boris III. The station is located between NDK II and Bulgaria.
