= Sredets, Sofia =

District of Sofia, Bulgaria

Sredets Средец
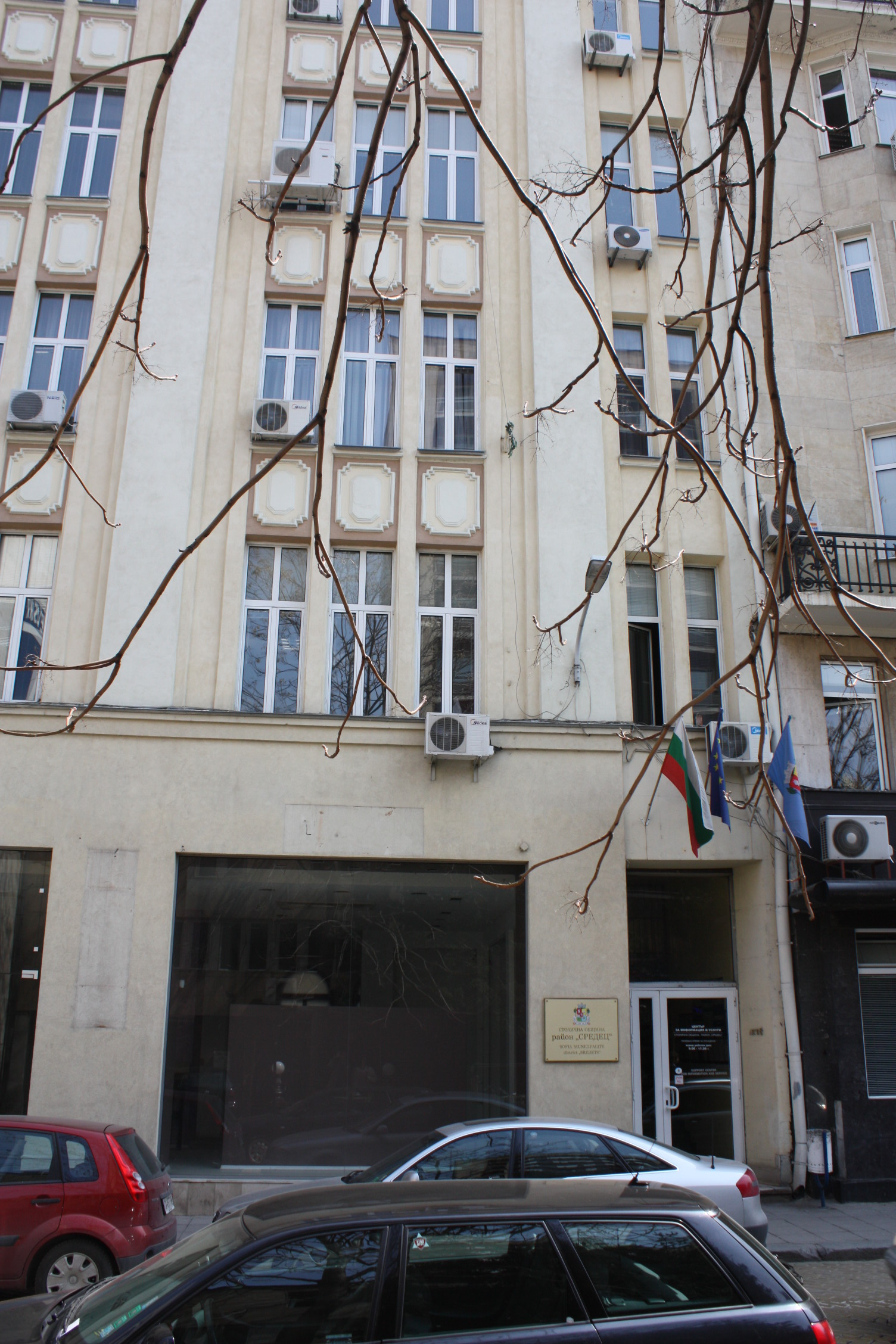
- Administrative Office

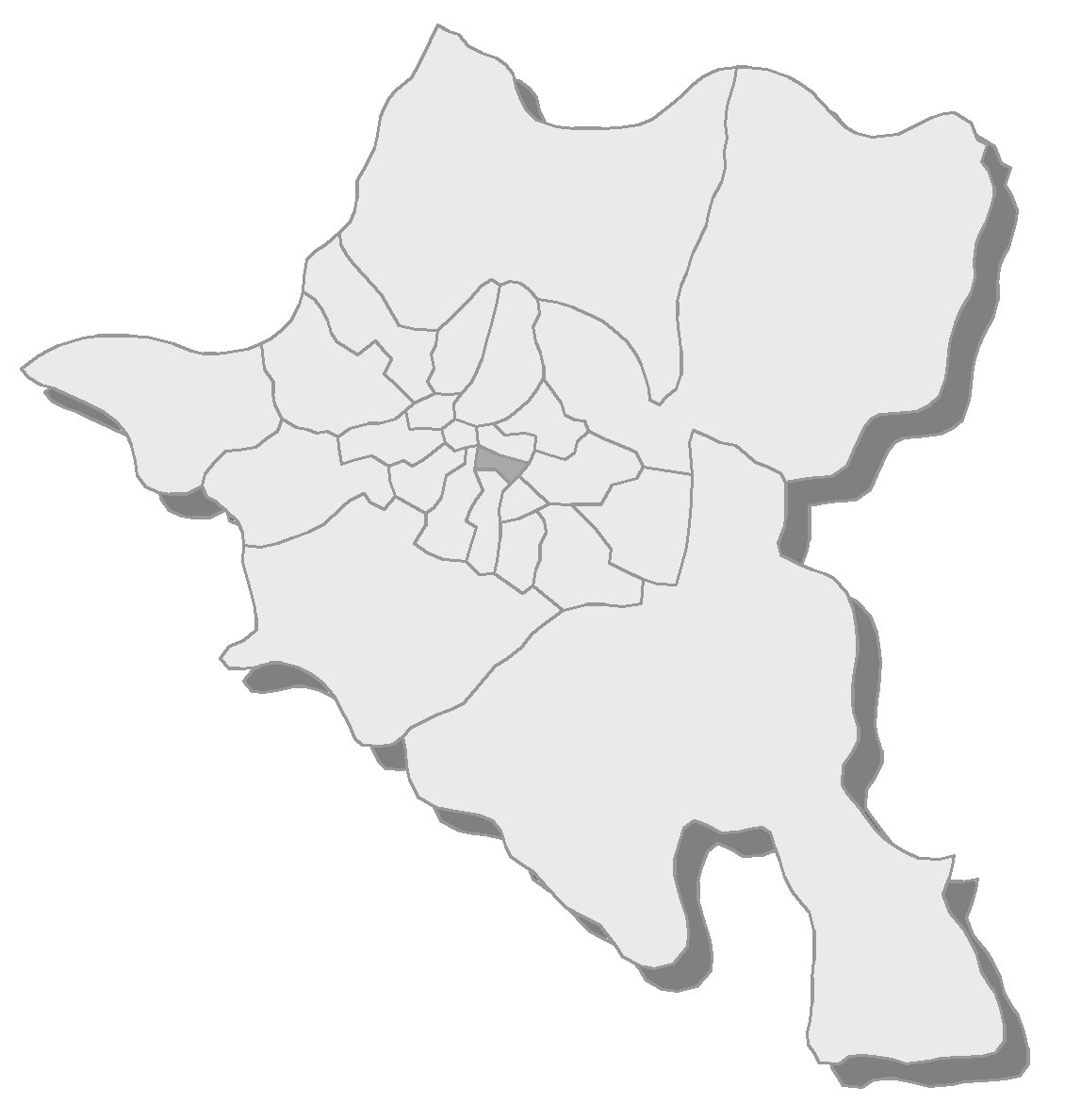
- Location of Sredets within Sofia Municipality
- Interactive map of Sredets
- Country: Bulgaria
- City: Sofia

Government
  - Mayor: Traycho Traykov (PP-DB—SS)

Area
  - Total: 3 km^{2} (1.2 sq mi)

Population (2023)
  - Total: 72,416
- Time zone: UTC+2 (EET)
  - Summer (DST): UTC+3 (EEST)
- Website: Sredec-sofia.org

Sredets (Bulgarian: Средец [srɛˈdɛt͡s]) is a district located in the centre of the capital Sofia. It has 72,461 officially registered inhabitants and spans approximately 300 hectares, or 3 km^{2}.

It borders Sitnyakovo Boulevard and Yavorov Alley to the east; Dragan Tsankov Boulevard and Evlogi Georgiev Boulevard to the south and south-west; Frityof Nansen Street and Vitosha Boulevard to the west; Dondukov Boulevard, Moskovska Street, Shipka Street, and Khan Omurtag Street to the north.

The district is the cultural center of the city. Rakovski Street, with its nine theatre venues, is known as "The Bulgarian Broadway".

Known for its green spaces and gardens, Sredets includes the northernmost parts of Boris' Garden. Two of the nation's most emblematic stadiums are situated within the park: the Vasil Levski National Stadium, where the Bulgaria national football team plays its home matches, and the Bulgarian Army Stadium, home ground of CSKA Sofia, the most successful club in the country's history.

== Cultural Landmarks ==
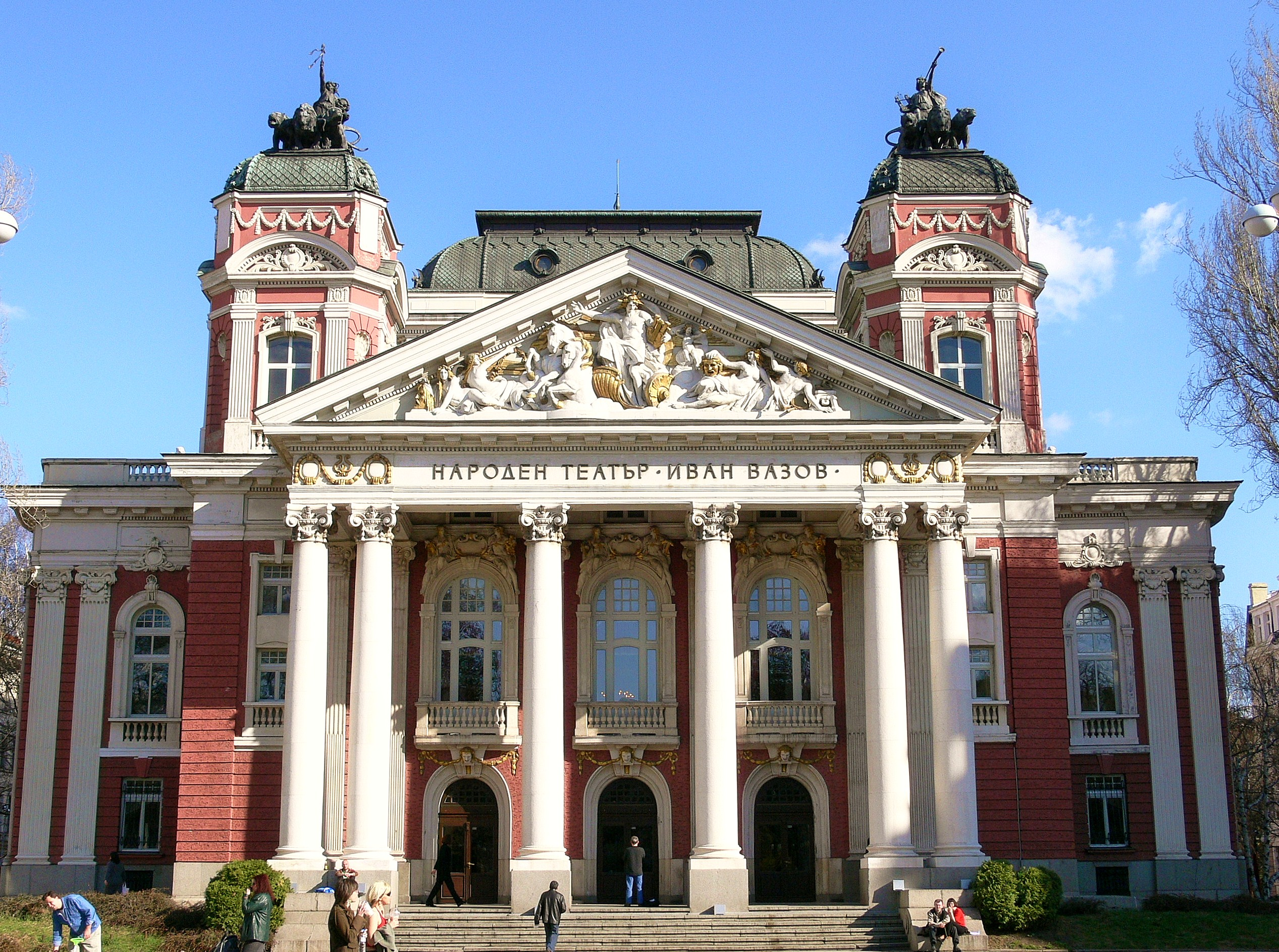
Ivan Vazov National Theatre

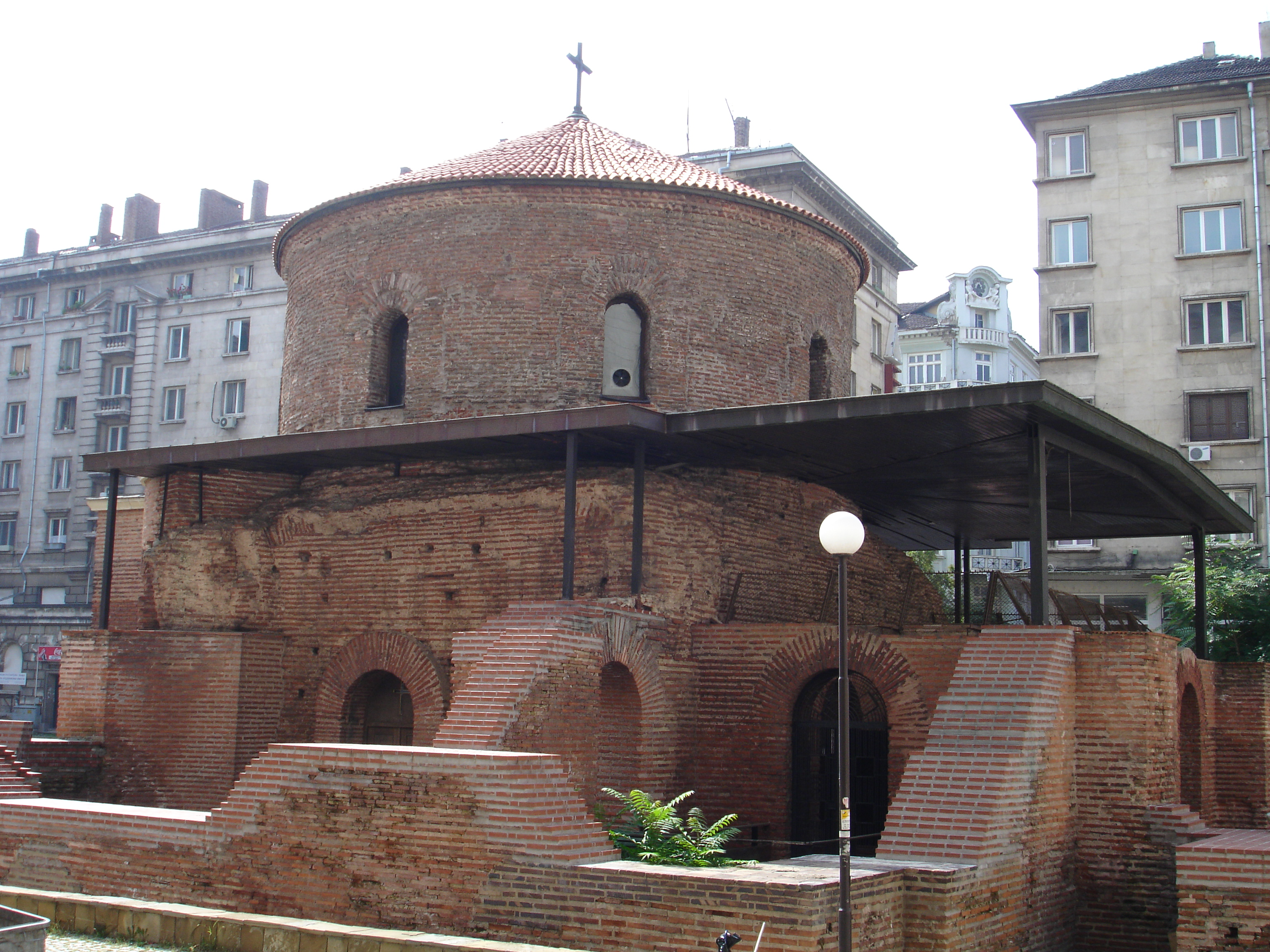
Church of St. George

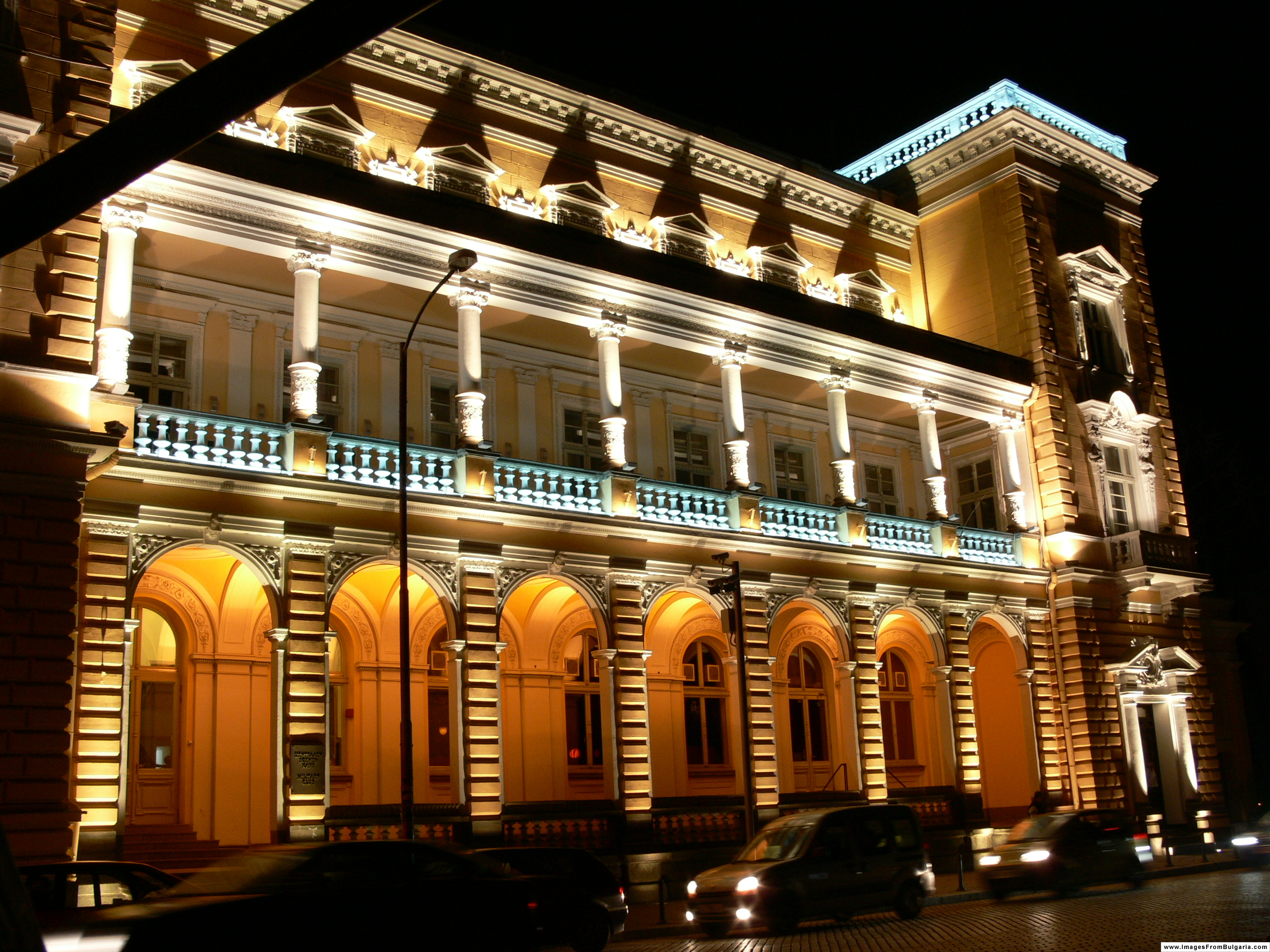
The Central Military Club

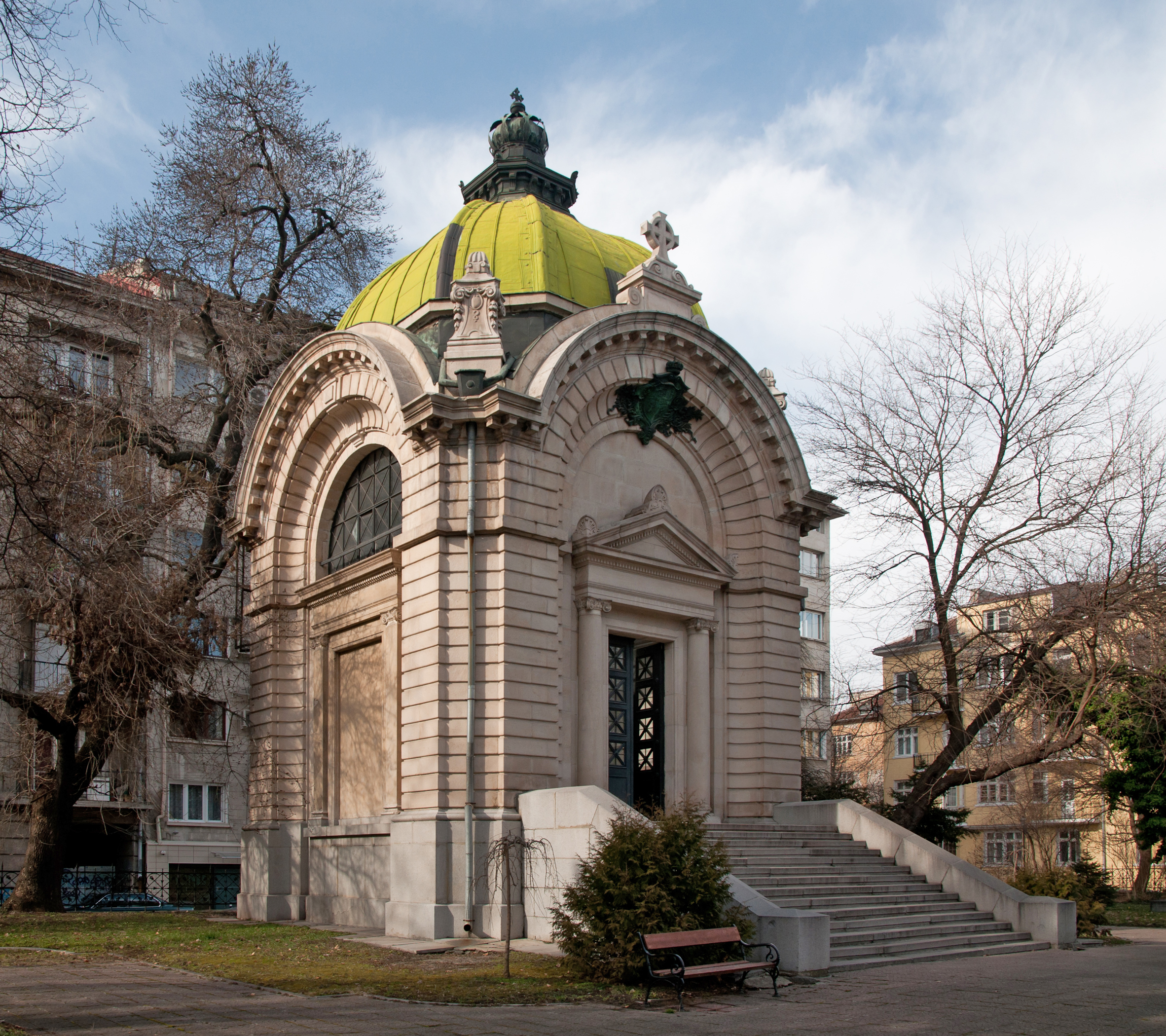
The Battenberg Mausoleum

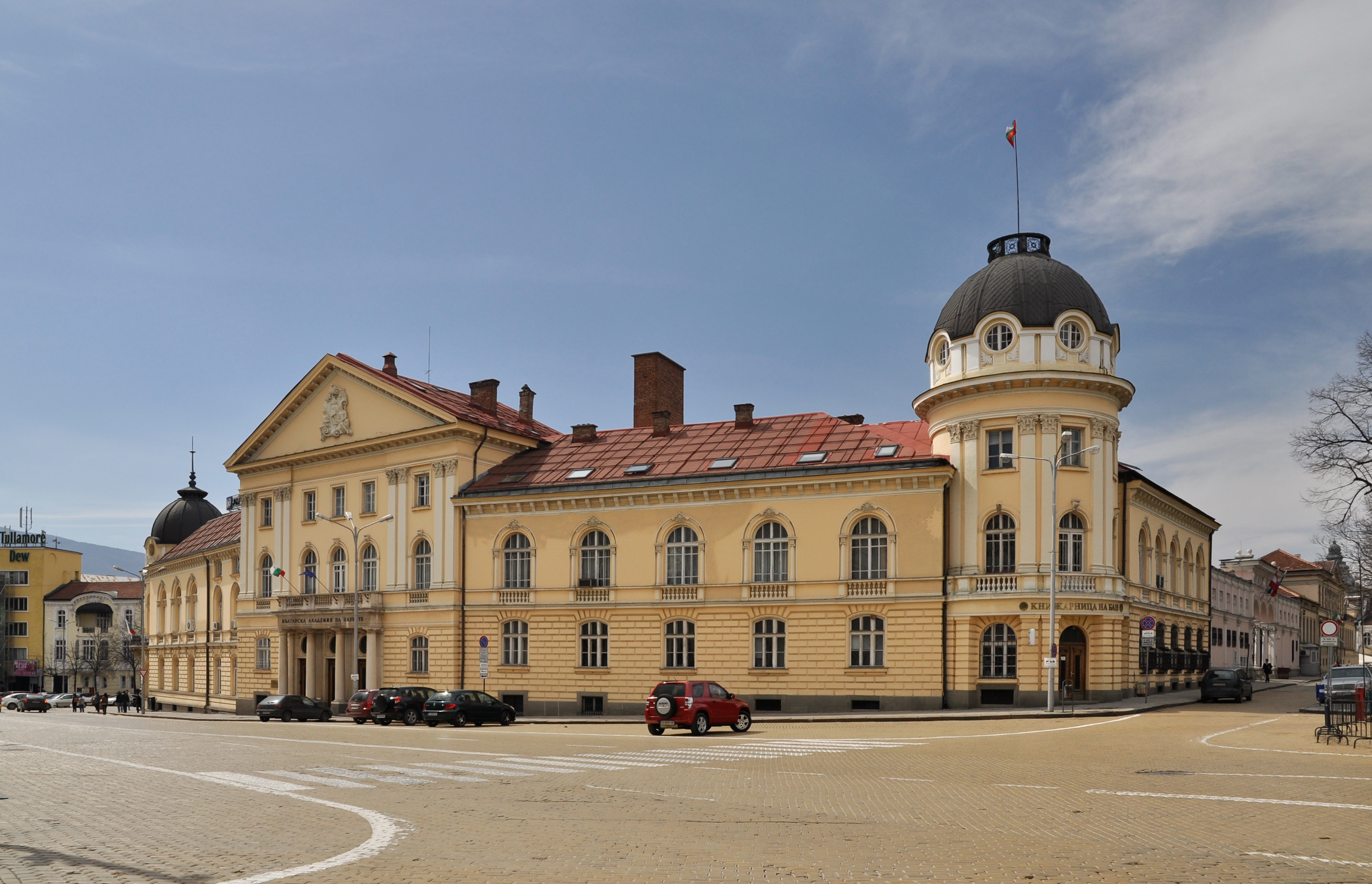
Bulgarian Academy of Sciences

The district occupies some areas of the ancient Roman city of Serdica. There are extensive remains from the settlement under contemporary edifices and more continue to be discovered during construction projects. Remains of the city walls and towers can also be observed in some underpasses.

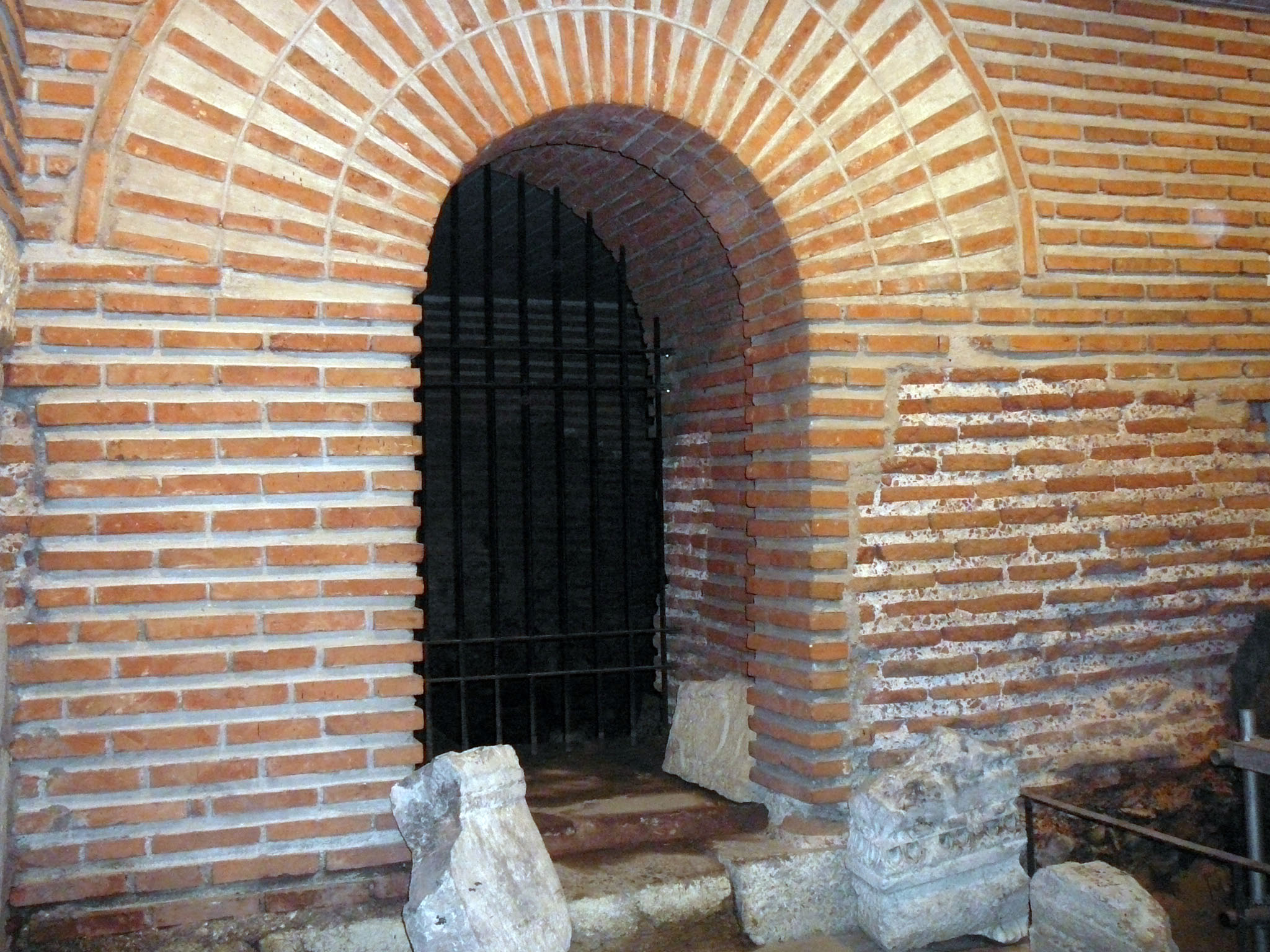
A Section of Serdica's Wall

One of the oldest churches on the Balkan Peninsula, Sv. Georgi (or St. George), is located in the yard of the Ministry of Education. The church is the oldest building in Sofia with its roof intact.

Major Landmarks

- The National Assembly
- The Presidency
- Bulgarian National Bank
- National Archaeological Museum
- National Museum of Natural History
- Bulgarian Academy of Sciences
- National Art Gallery
- Sofia University
- Ivan Vazov National Theatre
- Bulgarian National Film Archive
- Battenberg Mausoleum
- Monument to the Tsar Liberator
- Bulgaria Hall (home of the Sofia Philharmonic Orchestra)
- Grand Hotel Sofia
- Sofia Hotel Balkan
- Sofia Art Gallery
- Theatre of the Army
- Theatre of Satire
- Tear and Laughter Theatre
- Youth Theatre
- Theatre 199

Churches

- Church of Saint George
- St Nedelya Church
- Sveti Sedmochislenitsi Church
- Russian Church
