= NDK II Metro Station =

Sofia metro station

National Palace of Culture II Национален дворец на културата II

General information
- Location: 1463 Sofia center, Sofia
- Coordinates: 42°41′20.4″N 23°19′7.6″E
- Owner: Sofia Municipality
- Operator: Metropoliten JSC
- Platforms: side
- Tracks: 2
- Tram routes: 4
- Bus routes: none
- Connections
- Tram: 1, 6, 7, 27
- Metro: 2 via NDK Metro Station
- Trolleybus: 1, 2, 5, 7, 8, 9

Construction
- Structure type: sub-surface
- Depth: 28 m (92 ft)
- Platform levels: 3 or 4
- Parking: no
- Cycle facilities: yes
- Accessible: yes
- Architect: Farid Paktiawal

Other information
- Status: Staffed
- Station code: 3319; 3320
- Website: Official website

History
- Opened: 26 August 2020

Services
Preceding station	Sofia Metro	Following station
Medical University towards Gorna Banya	M3 line	St. Patriarch Evtimiy towards General Vladimir Vazov
Location

NDK II (Bulgarian: НДК II) is a Sofia Metro station on M3 line. It was opened on 26 August 2020 as part of the inaugural section of the line, from Hadzhi Dimitar to Krasno Selo; Krasno Selo was later renamed Tsar Boris III. The station is located between St. Patriarch Evtimiy and Medical University. Transfer to NDK on M2 line is available.

== Location ==
The station is serving the National Palace of Culture.
