= Bulgaria Metro Station =

Sofia metro station

Bulgaria България

General information
- Location: 1431 Sofia center, Sofia
- Coordinates: 42°40′45.8″N 23°18′6.3″E
- Owner: Sofia Municipality
- Operator: Metropoliten JSC
- Platforms: side
- Tracks: 2
- Tram routes: 2
- Bus routes: 7
- Connections
- Tram: 7, 27
- Trolleybus: 2, 8, 9
- Bus: 64, 74, 76, 102, 204, 304, 604

Construction
- Structure type: sub-surface
- Depth: 16 m (52 ft)
- Platform levels: 2
- Parking: no
- Cycle facilities: yes
- Accessible: yes
- Architect: Krasen Andreev

Other information
- Status: Staffed
- Station code: 3323; 3324
- Website: Official website

History
- Opened: 26 August 2020

Services
| Preceding station | Sofia Metro | Following station |
|---|---|---|
| Tsar Boris III towards Gorna Banya | M3 line | Medical University towards General Vladimir Vazov |
Location

Bulgaria (Bulgarian: България) is a Sofia Metro station on the M3 line. It was opened on 26 August 2020 as part of the inaugural section of the line, from Hadzhi Dimitar to Krasno Selo; Krasno Selo was later renamed Tsar Boris III. The station is located at the intersection of the boulevards "Bulgaria" and "Akad. Ivan Geshov" and has a total of 7 exits - 5 on each side of the intersection and 2 more for the tram stops.
