= Vitosha Boulevard =

Commercial street in Sofia, Bulgaria

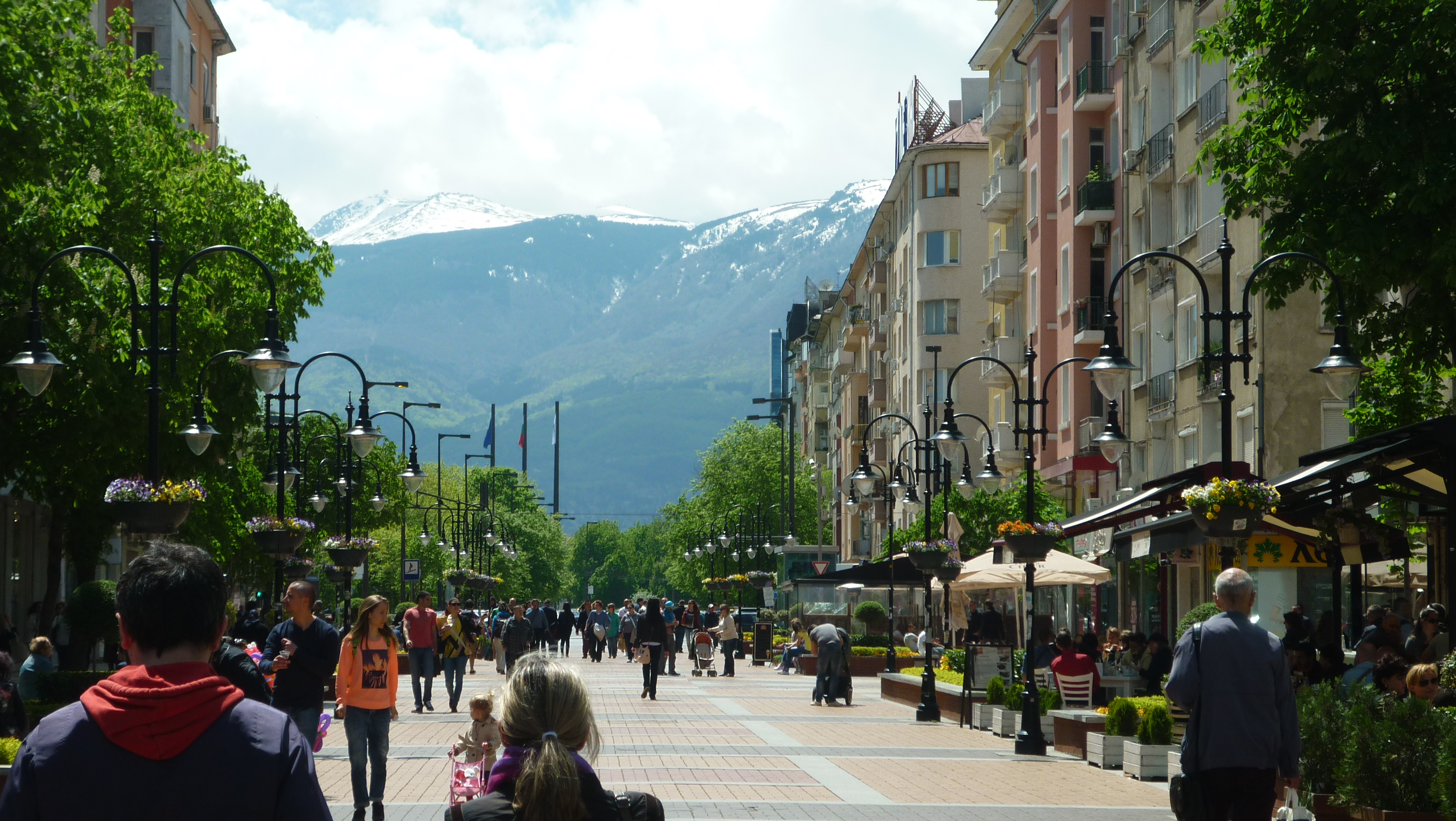
- View towards Vitosha mountain
- Interactive map of Vitosha Boulevard
- Native name: Булевард „Витоша“ (Bulgarian)
- Former name(s): General Gurko (briefly in the early 20th century); Tsaritsa Yoanna
- Type: Boulevard
- Length: 2.7 km (1.7 mi)
- Location: Sofia
- Coordinates: 42°41′28.79″N 23°19′10.78″E
- West end: South park
- East end: St Nedelya Square

Vitosha Boulevard (Bulgarian: булевард „Витоша“, often called just Витошка, Vitoshka) is the main commercial street in the centre of Sofia, the capital of Bulgaria, which has stores, restaurants and bars. It extends from the St Nedelya Square to the Southern Park. Many high-end fashion labels have outlets on Vitosha boulevard and the neighbouring streets: Versace, Escada, Bulgari, D&G, La Perla, Lacoste, Van Laak, Ermenegildo Zegna, Tru Trussardi, Moreschi, Marella, Max Mara, Gianfranco Ferré, Emporio Armani, Tommy Hilfiger, Boss, Baldinini. Among the notable buildings, located on the boulevard are: The National Palace of Culture, The Palace of the Courts, the house where the famous Bulgarian poet Peyo Yavorov lived and died. The corner of Vitosha and Patriarch Evtimiy boulevards, so called the Pharmacy (Bulgarian: Аптека), is a popular place for meetings.

The boulevard is named after Vitosha, the mountain near Sofia. It was an unadjusted street during the Ottoman rule of Bulgaria and acquired the name Vitoshka ulitsa ("Vitosha Street") after the Liberation in 1883. The street was initially built up with low one-storey houses, but turned into an imposing trade street in the Interwar period as massive public buildings were constructed, changing Vitoshka's appearance completely.

According to a 2007 Cushman & Wakefield, Inc. study, Vitosha Boulevard is the world's 22nd most expensive trade street.

In May 2007, a renovation of the boulevard was announced, which aimed to restore the style of 1930s Sofia. Historical benches and street lights were added, as well as Art Nouveau round kiosks, more green areas, fountains, open-air bars, and a clock tower at the St Nedelya Church displaying the time in various world capitals.

In March 2013, reconstruction works on the boulevard started.

In summer 2015, there was another renovation of the boulevard completing the entirely pedestrian zone of the boulevard between Patriarch Evtimiy Blvd. and Alabin Str.

== Transport links ==
The north end of the pedestrian part of the boulevard is served by Serdika and Serdika II stations of the Sofia Metro as well as several tram lines, while the south end is served by NDK and NDK II metro stations and trolleybus lines.

== Gallery ==
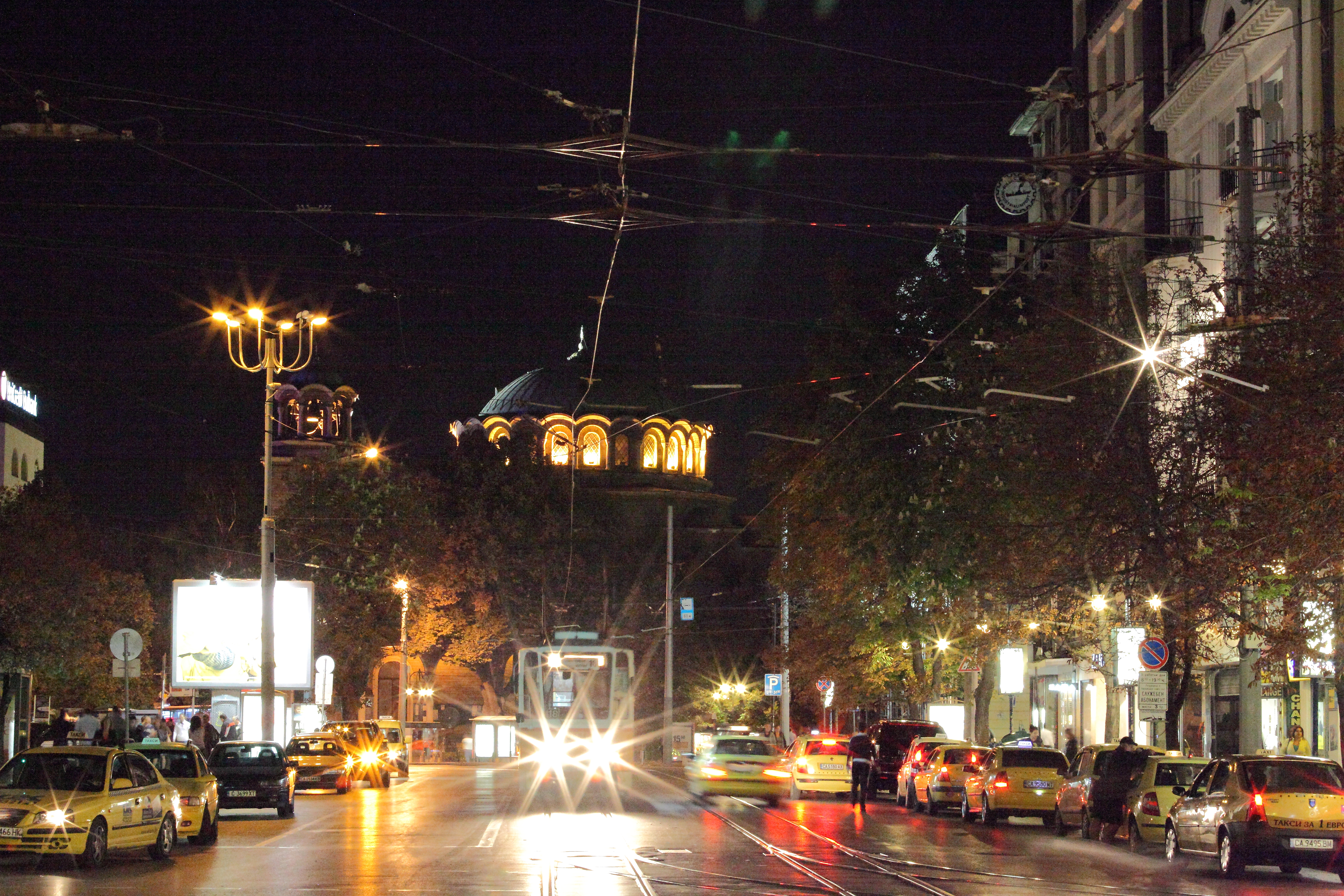
Vitoshka, as seen from near NDK, with the St Nedelya Church in the distance

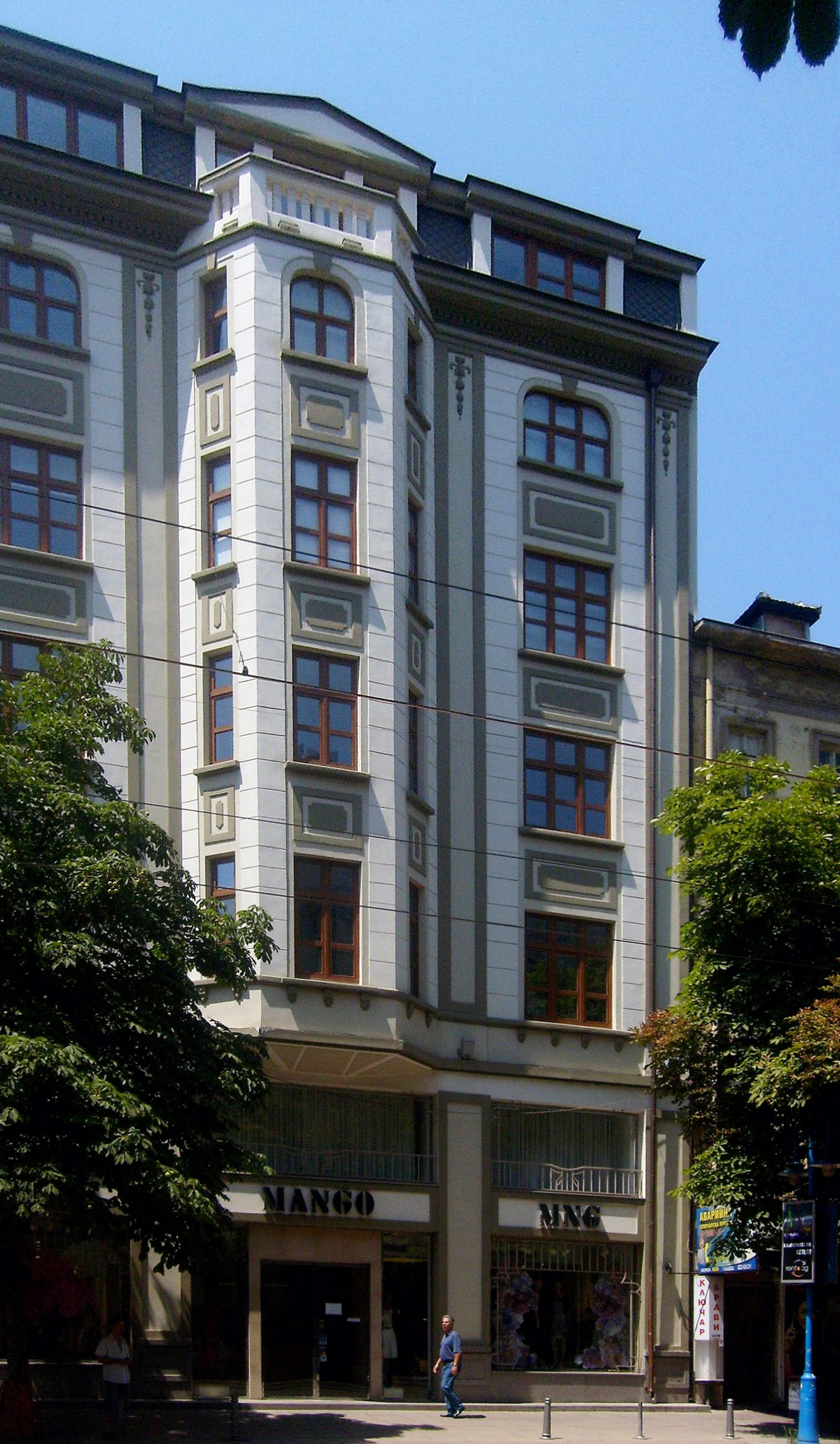
A building on Vitoshka

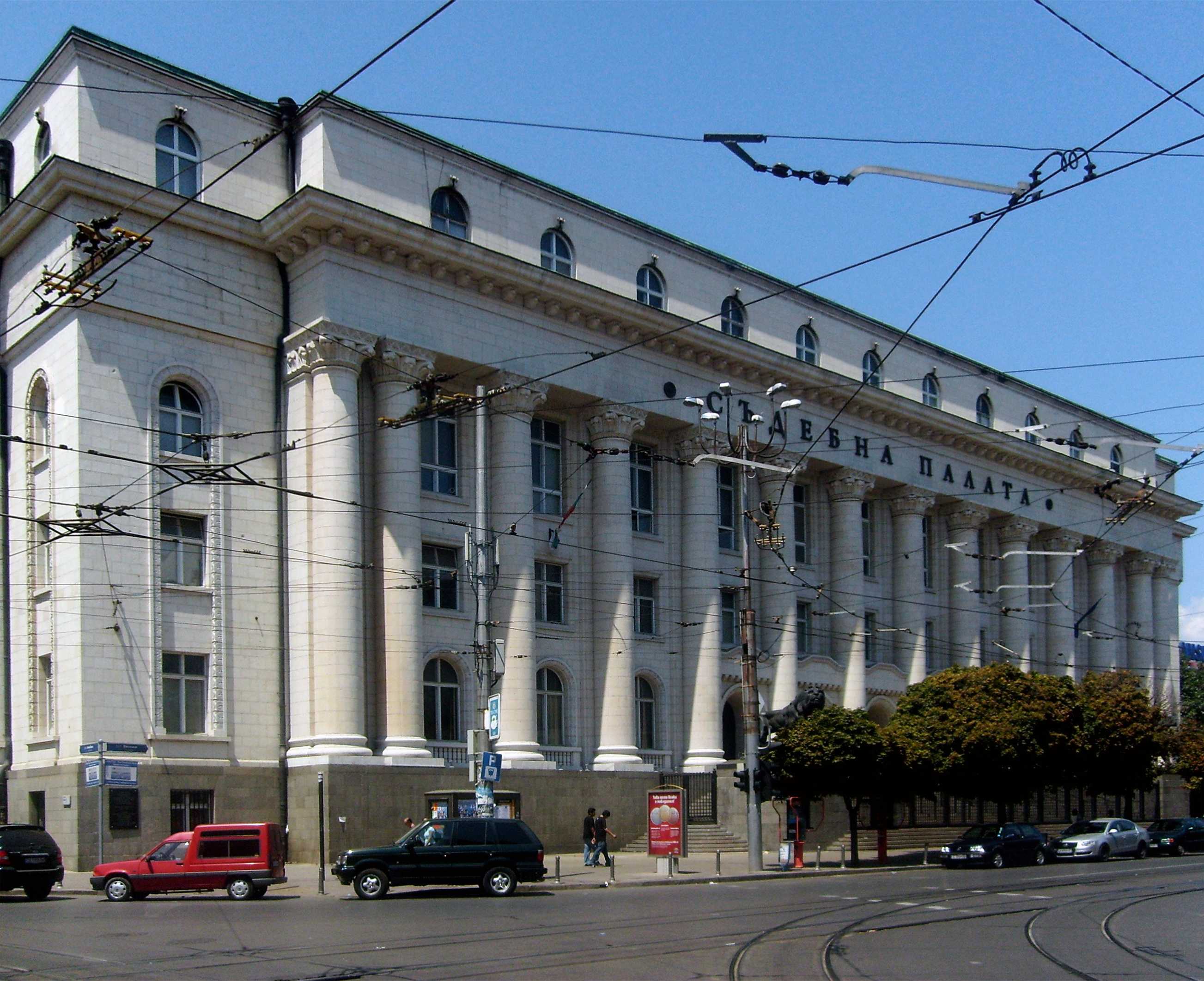
The Sofia Court House on 2 Vitosha Boulevard

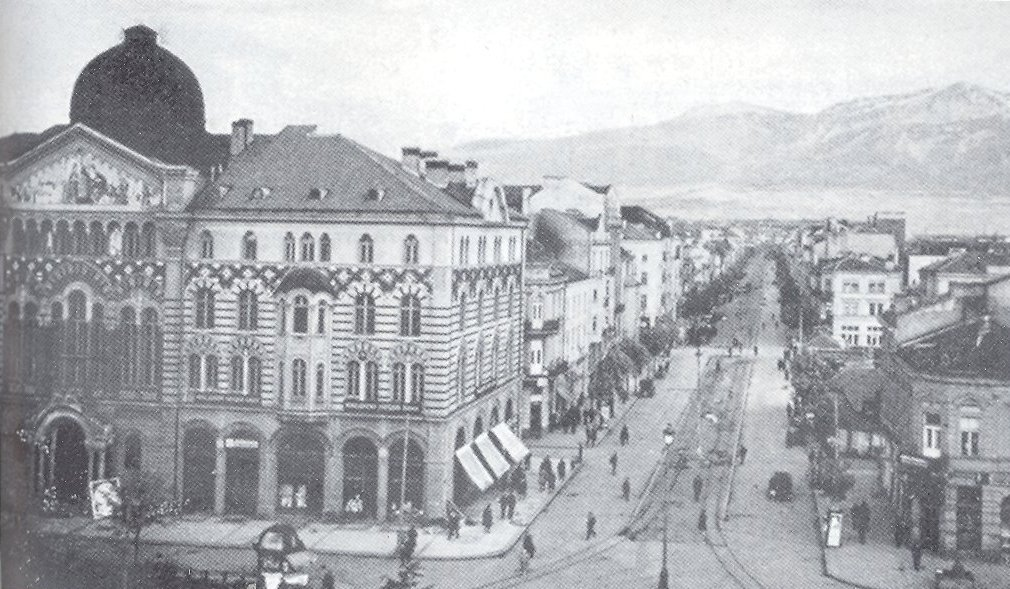
Vitoshka, circa 1934 with the Sofia University's Theology Faculty in front left.
