= Grand Hotel Sofia =

Hotel in Sofia, Bulgaria

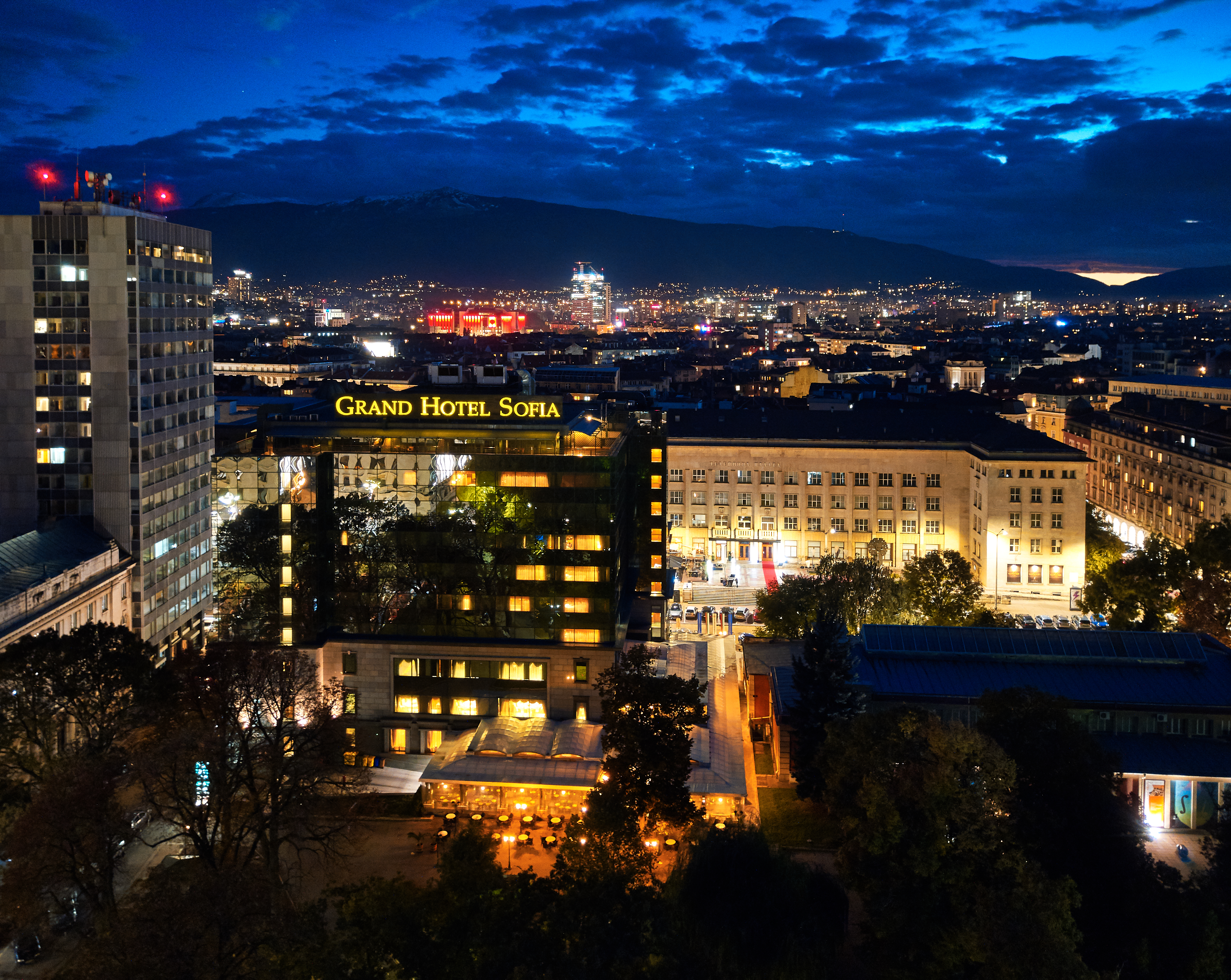

- Location within Bulgaria

General information
- Location: Sofia, Bulgaria
- Coordinates: 42°41′38″N 23°19′29″E

Other information
- Number of rooms: 109
- Number of suites: 13
- Number of restaurants: 1

Grand Hotel Sofia is a five-star hotel in the center of Sofia, Bulgaria.

Located in the Sredets district, the cultural center of the city, the hotel is a short distance from the Bulgarian National Theatre, the National Art Gallery, the National Archaeological Museum, and the Alexander Nevsky Cathedral.

Set in a modern marble-glass building, it has 109 rooms, 13 luxury apartments, a gym, and a restaurant. It has a notable collection of over 400 original oil paintings.

A number of Hollywood stars are known to have stayed there while shooting on location in Bulgaria. Between 2005 and 2007, the hotel hosted the M-Tel Masters annual chess tournament.
