= NDK Metro Station =

Sofia metro station

National Palace of Culture Национален дворец на културата
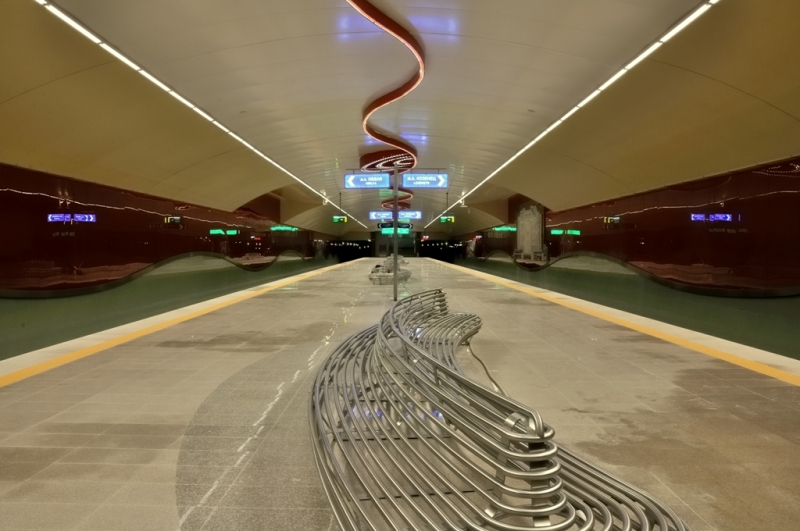

General information
- Location: 1463 Pette Kyosheta Sq., Sofia
- Coordinates: 42°41′14.06″N 23°19′9.77″E
- Owner: Sofia Municipality
- Operator: Metropoliten JSC
- Platforms: island
- Tracks: 2
- Connections
- Tram: 1, 6, 7
- Metro: 3 via NDK II Metro Station
- Trolleybus: 1, 2, 5, 7, 8, 9

Construction
- Structure type: sub-surface
- Platform levels: 2
- Parking: no
- Cycle facilities: no
- Accessible: yes
- Architect: Elena and Farid Paktiawal

Other information
- Status: Staffed
- Station code: 2981; 2982
- Website: Official website

History
- Opened: 31 August 2012

Passengers
- 2020: 385,000

Services
Preceding station	Sofia Metro	Following station
European Union towards Vitosha	M2 line	Serdika II towards Obelya
Location

NDK Metro Station (Bulgarian: Метростанция „Национален дворец на културата“ / Метростанция „НДК“, Natsionalen Dvorets na Kulturata, ‘National Palace of Culture’) is a station on the Sofia Metro in Bulgaria. It opened on 31 August 2012. Bulgaria's PM Boyko Borisov and the President of the European Commission Jose Manuel Barroso inaugurated the new section of the Sofia Metro, which was funded with EU money. On 26 August 2020, transfer to NDK II on M3 line was opened.

== Interchange with other public transport ==
North side:

- Trolleybus service: 1, 2, 5, 7, 8, 9

South side:

- Tramway service: 1, 6, 7
- Trolleybus service: 1, 2, 5, 7, 8, 9

== Location ==
The station is serving the National Palace of Culture and the south end of Vitosha Boulevard.

== Gallery ==
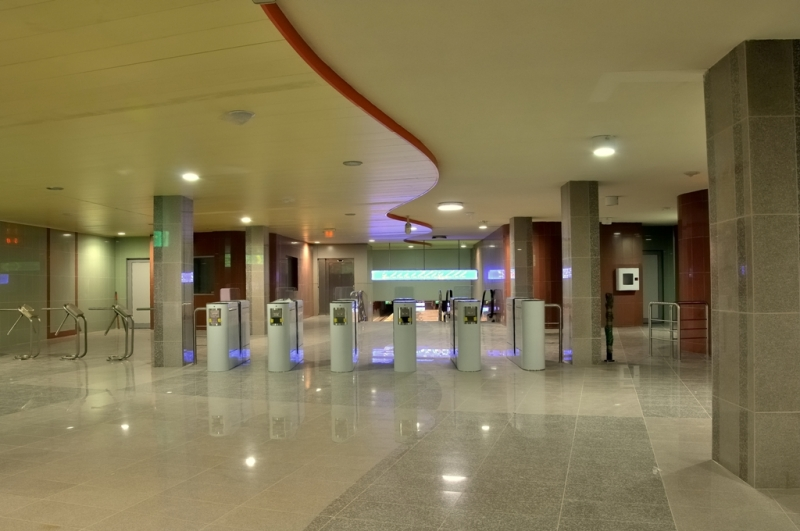
