= Aleksandar Barov =

Bulgarian architect

Aleksandar Georgiev Barov (Bulgarian: Александър Георгиев Баров) (1931 in Razlog – 1999 in Sofia) was an eminent Bulgarian architect.

== Principal works ==
- National Palace of Culture, Sofia (1978)
- Universiada Hall, Sofia (1961)
- Accra Sports Stadium, Ghana (1961)
- Bulgarian Embassy in Moscow (1977)
- City Hall, Ruse
- Boyana Residence (1974)—the former prime-ministerial residence in Sofia, which is now Bulgaria's National Historical Museum
- Flame Monument, Panicharevo, Bulgaria (1975)
