= Krasno selo =

District of Sofia, Bulgaria

Krasno selo Красно село
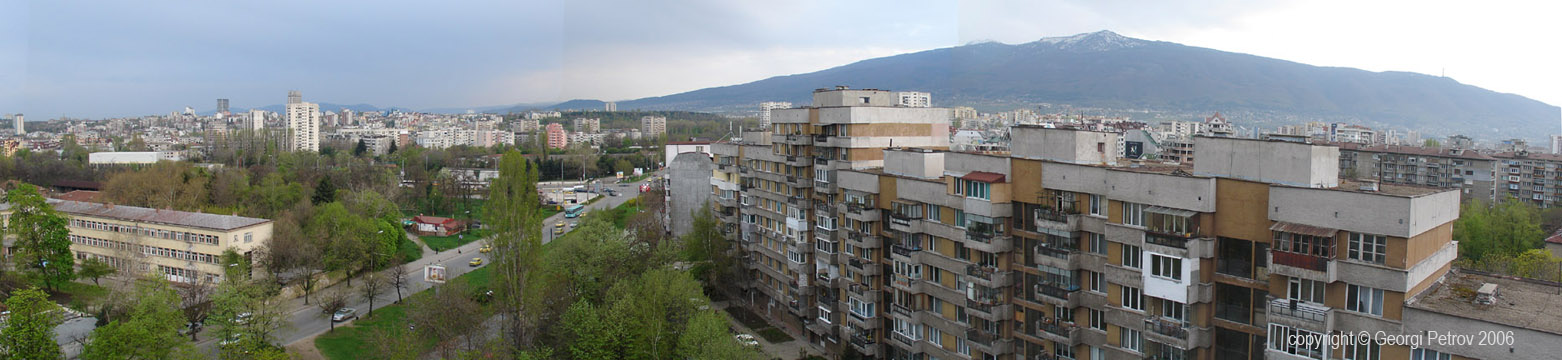
- Krasno selo

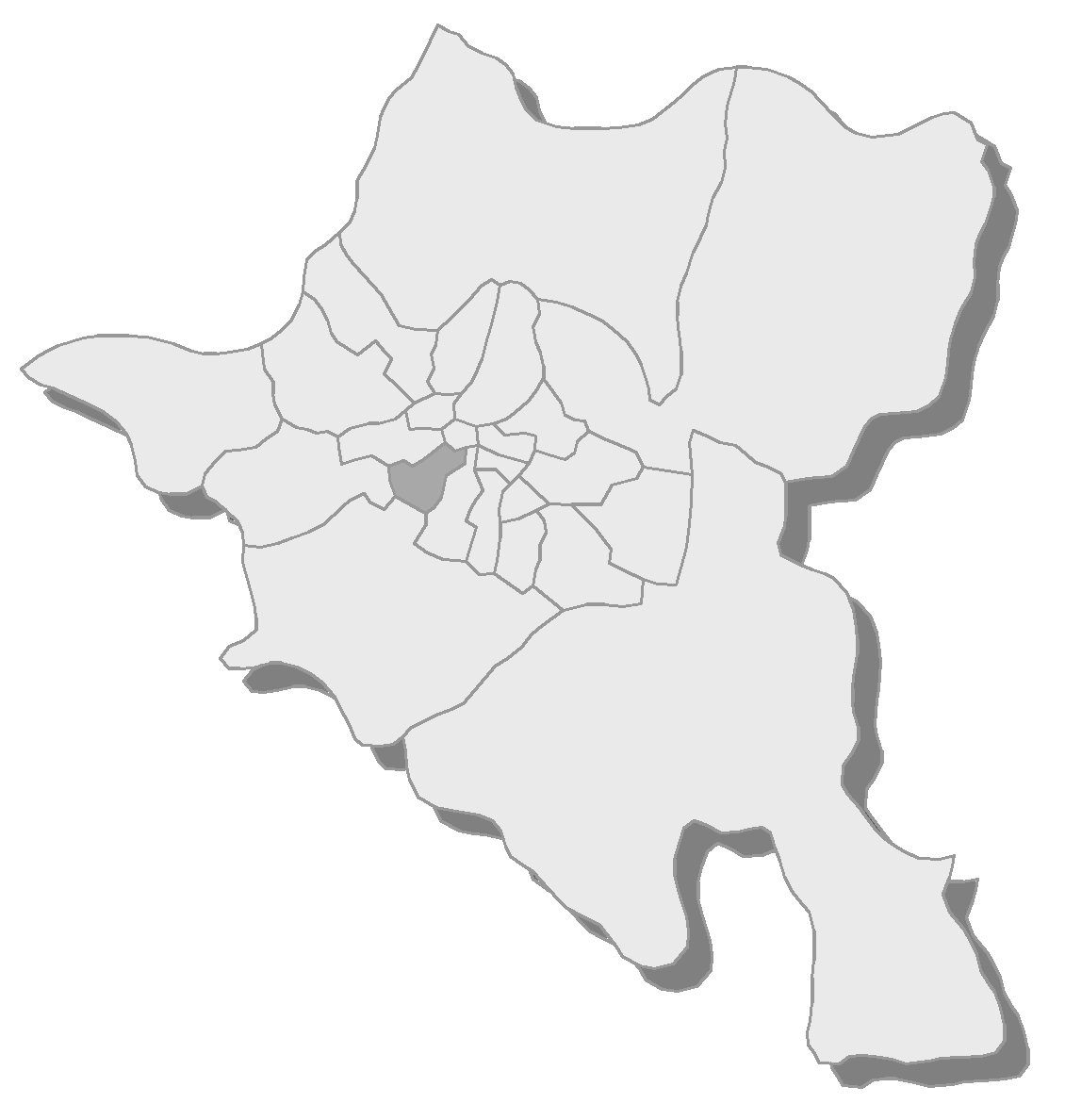
- Location of Krasno selo in Sofia
- Interactive map of Krasno selo
- Coordinates: 42°40′42″N 23°17′4″E
- Country: Bulgaria
- City: Sofia

Government
  - Mayor: Rosina Stanislavova Democratic Bulgaria

Area
  - Total: 7.2 km^{2} (2.8 sq mi)

Population (2021)
  - Total: 91,642
- Time zone: UTC+2 (EET)
  - Summer (DST): UTC+3 (EEST)
- Website: Official site of Krasno selo District

Krasno selo (Bulgarian: Красно село [ˈkrasno ˈsɛɫo]) is a district and neighbourhood of Sofia, the capital of Bulgaria, located in the western part of the city. The main thoroughfare in the neighbourhood is Tsar Boris III Boulevard.

Until 1910, Krasno selo was a mahala (neighbourhood) of Boyana. In 1956, it became a district of Sofia, but it had been a suburb of the city since the early 20th century. The name stems from the common noun selo ("village") and the adjective krasno, meaning "beautiful".

After the Second Balkan War and the First World War thousands of families of Bulgarian refugees (mainly from Western Thrace, Vardar Macedonia, Southern Dobruja and the Western Outlands) headed to the large Bulgarian cities in search of a better life. During that period prior to the Second World War Krasno selo, once a satellite neighbourhood, urbanized quickly and accommodated many refugee families, with various parts of Krasno selo today known as the Dobrujan neighbourhood, the Tsaribrod neighbourhood, etc. Architectural elements in the houses of Bulgarian refugees show a nostalgia for their native regions, an example of which is the round tower of a 1929 house reminiscent of the White Tower in Thessaloniki.

The growth of Krasno selo was aided by the geographical importance of the western transport corridor leading to Pernik. One of the first tramways of the Balkans, then known as Knyazhevska, was officially opened on 1 January 1901 along what is today Tsar Boris III Boulevard.

The architecture of Krasno selo is made of mostly residential buildings. The largest portion of residential structures are of the type Soviet era panel buildings. Newer residential buildings date to the period after 1990. These structures are made of brick and are only several stories high. The panel buildings, on the other hand, vary in height from five to over twenty stories.

Krasno Selo is home to the Krasno Selo market. The second largest market is in Borovo quarter. Borovo is located at the end stop of trolley #9.

The 1–12 grade school within the limits of the Krasno selo neighborhood is 142 SOU.

In 2020 Krasno selo metro station was opened as part of Sofia Metro Line 3.

== Gallery ==
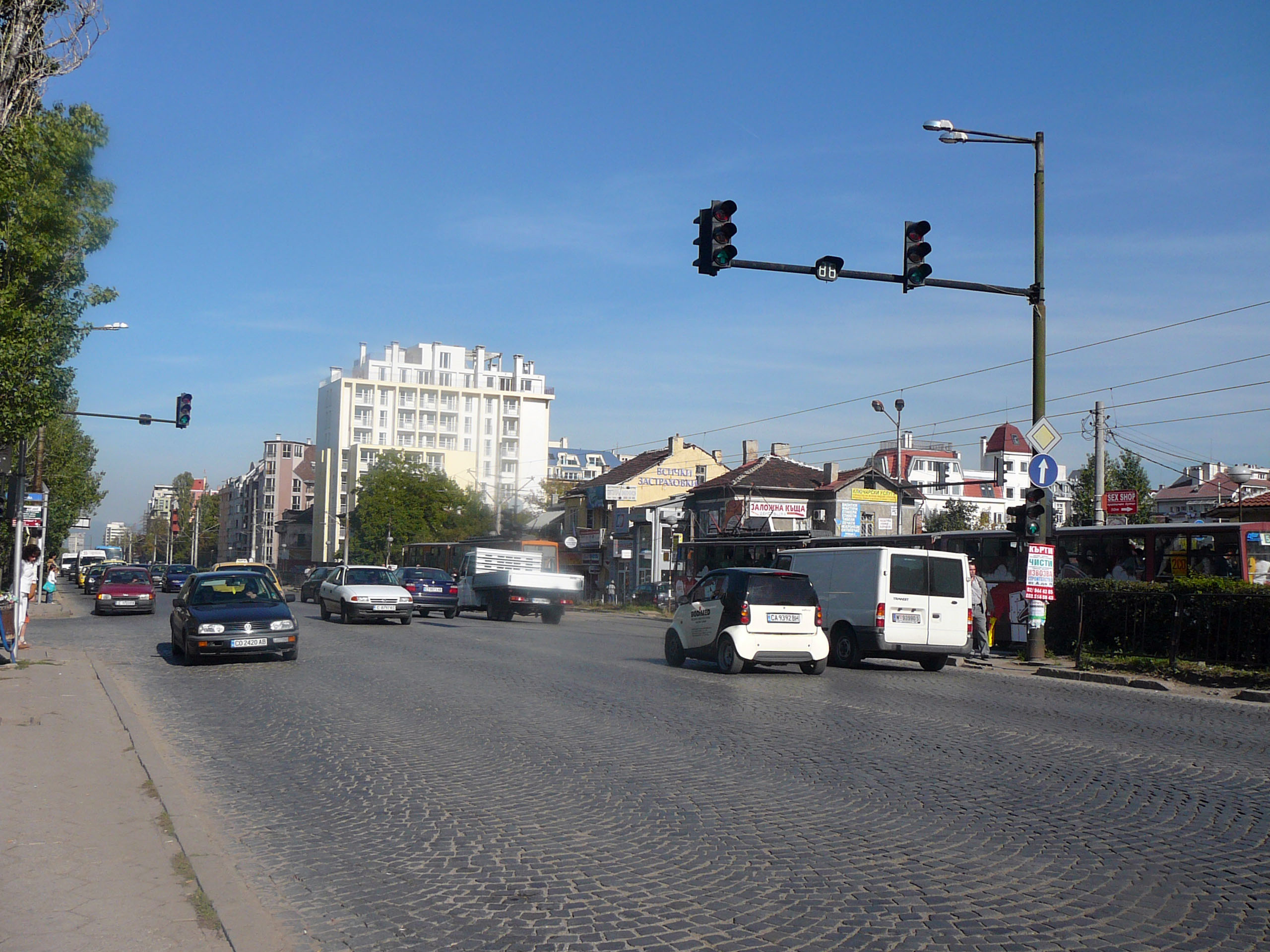
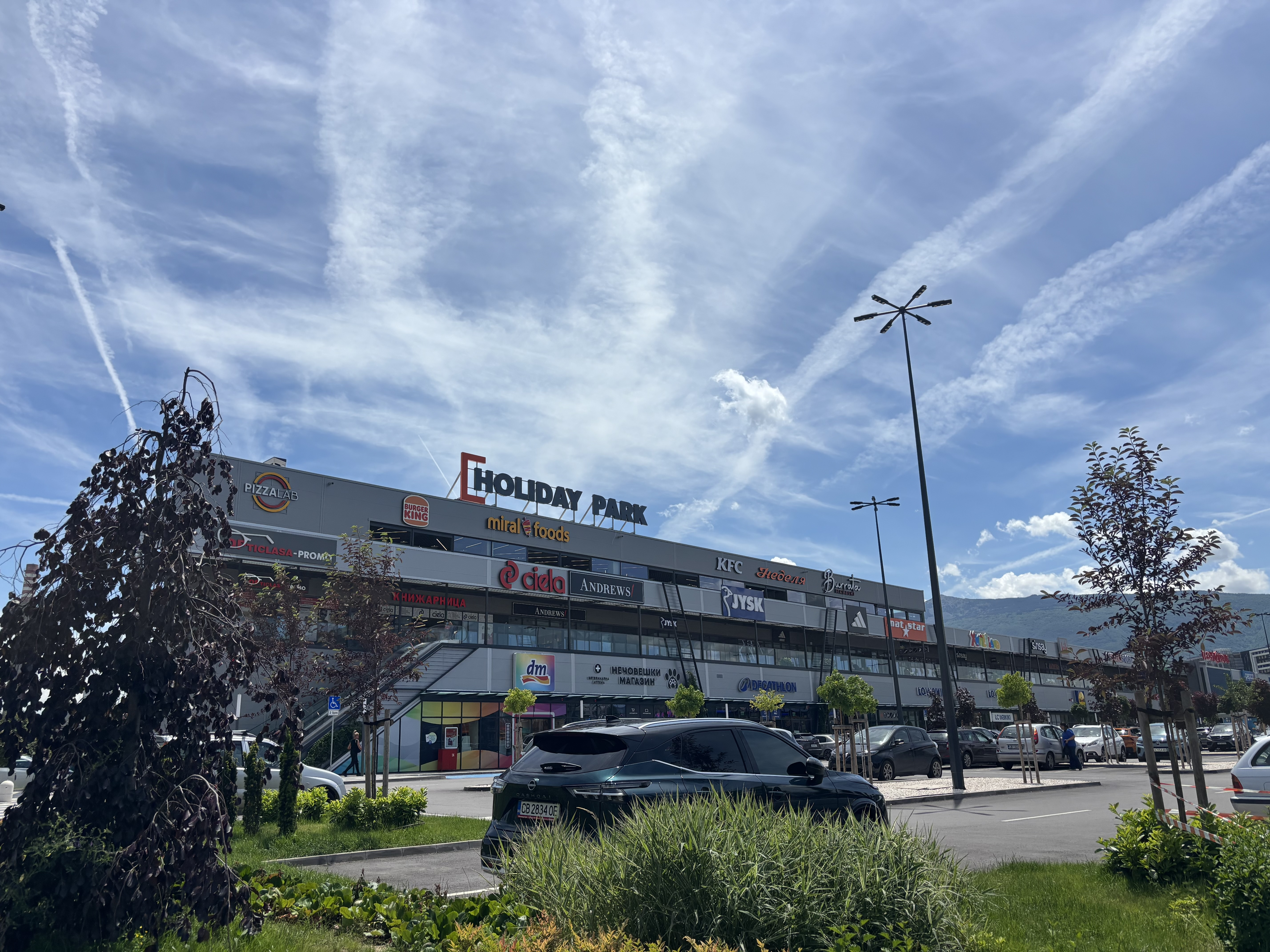
New Holiday Park Crasno Celo
At the crossroad of Tsar Boris III blvd and Zhitnitsa str, near Krasno selo market. Krasno selo metro station is located here.

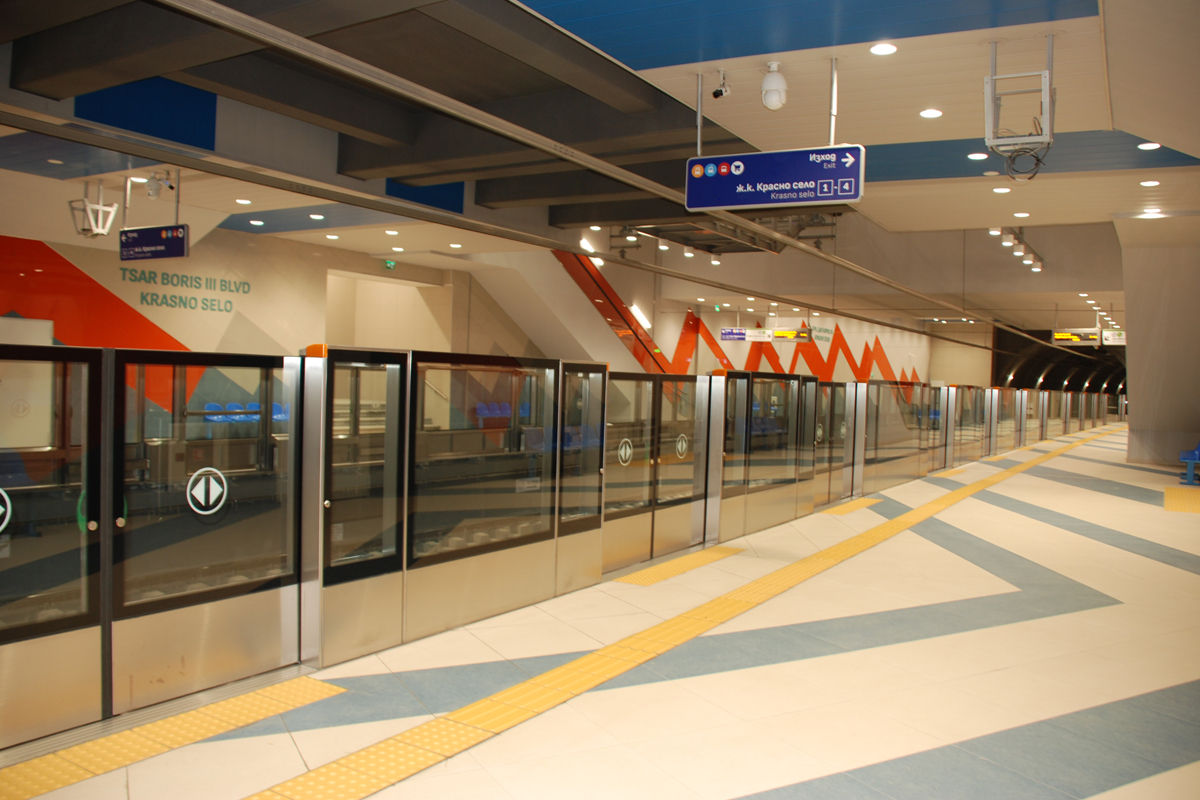
Krasno selo metro station

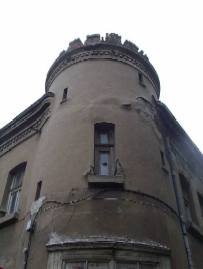
"The house with the tower", built in 1929 by Bulgarian WWI refugees from Aegean Macedonia. The tower resembles the Thessaloniki tower.
