= National Palace of Culture =

Conference center in Sofia, Bulgaria

- Национален дворец на културата Natsionalen dvorets na kulturata
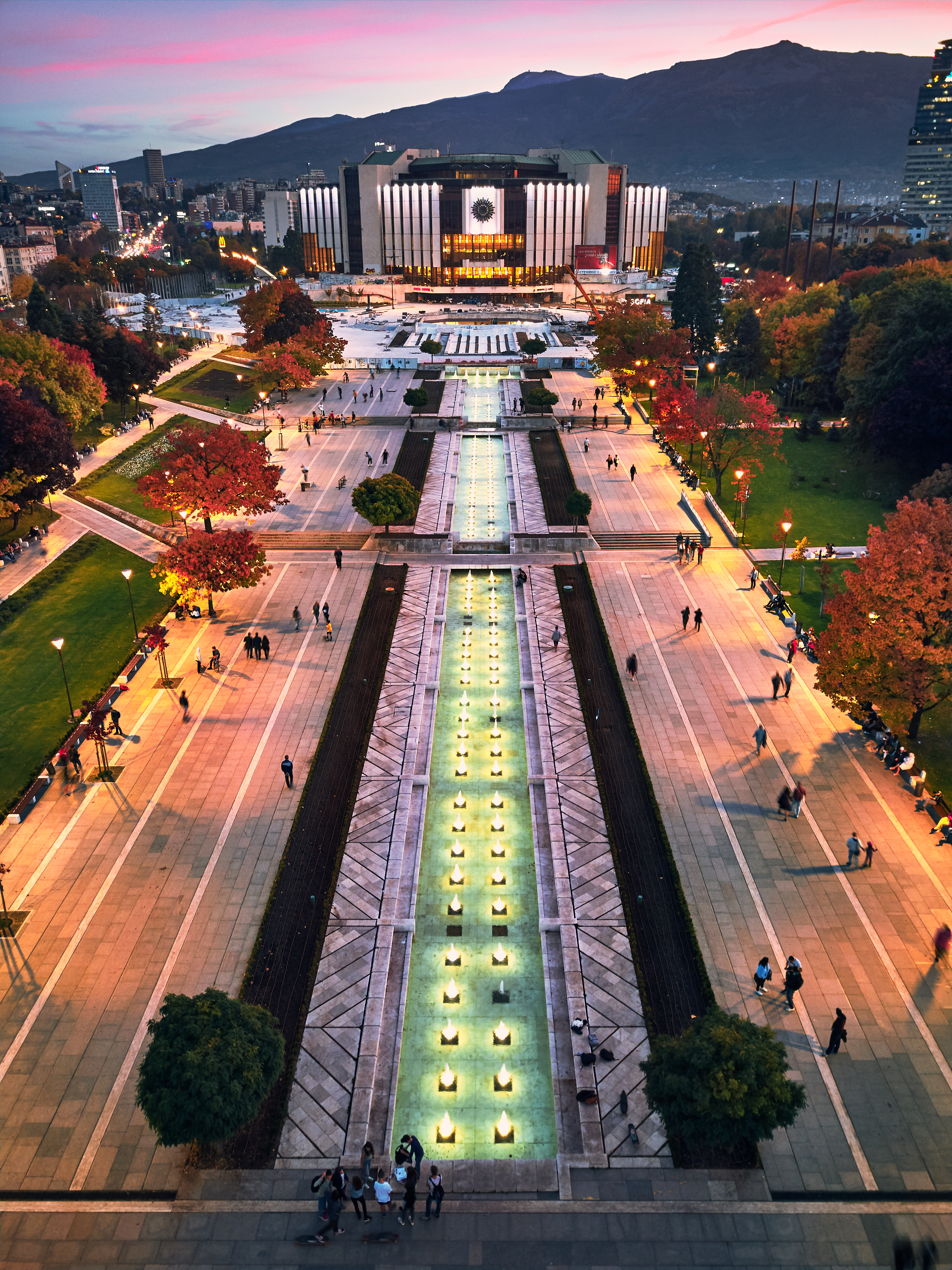

- Location within Sofia
- Location: Sofia, Bulgaria
- Coordinates: 42°41′5″N 23°19′8″E
- Elevation: 51 m (167 ft)
- Capacity: 3,380 (Hall 1); 1,200 (Hall 3); 504 (Azaryan Theatre); 370 (Lumiere Cinema)
- Public transit: 2 via NDK Metro Station; 3 via NDK II Metro Station; trolleybuses, trams

Construction
- Groundbreaking: 1979
- Built: 1978–1981
- Opened: 31 March 1981
- Architects: Alexander Georgiev Barov; Atanas Agura; Ivan Kanazirev

Tenant
- Sofia International Film Festival

Website
- www.ndk.bg

The National Palace of Culture (Национален дворец на културата, Natsionalen dvorets na kulturata; abbreviated as НДК, NDK) is a multifunctional conference and cultural centre in Sofia, the capital of Bulgaria. It was opened on 31 March 1981 in celebration of the 1300th anniversary of the Bulgarian state.

The centre was initiated at the suggestion of Lyudmila Zhivkova, daughter of the communist leader of the former People's Republic of Bulgaria Todor Zhivkov. The project was designed by a team of Bulgarian and foreign architects led by Alexander Georgiev Barov (1931–1999), together with Ivan Kanazirev. The landscaping of Bulgaria Square in front of the National Palace of Culture was designed by a team led by Atanas Agura.

Internally, the building exhibits a unified visual style, employing geometric motifs, dark colours, monumental murals, mosaics, sculptures, woodcarvings and metal works created by Bulgarian artists of the second half of the twentieth century.

During the 1990s, after the political changes in Bulgaria, the NDK lost a significant portion of its property, including infrastructure, commercial areas and car parks. Since 2011, the NDK has been restructured as a commercial company, while remaining state property.

In July 2005, the National Palace of Culture was proclaimed the best congress centre in the world for the year by the International Association of Congress Centres.

The centre is equipped to host concerts, multilingual conferences, exhibitions, congresses, festivals and performances. It has a total functional area of 123,000 square metres over eight floors and three underground levels, with multiple halls, exhibition areas, lobbies and auxiliary spaces.

The Sofia International Film Festival takes place in the NDK.

== Concerts and performing arts ==
The National Palace of Culture is one of the major concert venues in the Bulgarian capital. Its Hall 1 has hosted symphonic concerts, opera galas, ballet performances, pop and rock concerts, film music projects and touring productions.

Over the years, the NDK has hosted appearances by Bulgarian and international artists, orchestras, ballet companies and conductors. The institution's anniversary materials and cultural coverage cite names such as Herbert von Karajan, Montserrat Caballé, Sting, Michael Bolton, José Carreras, Andrea Bocelli, Nicolai Ghiaurov, Gena Dimitrova, Anna Tomowa-Sintow, Yuri Bashmet, Mark Knopfler, Joe Cocker, James Brown, Paco de Lucía, Goran Bregović, Hugh Laurie and others.

Guest orchestras and performing companies associated with the NDK have included the Bolshoi Theatre, Teatro alla Scala, the London Symphony Orchestra, the Vienna Philharmonic Orchestra, the Vienna State Opera, the Royal Swedish Ballet, the British Royal Ballet and the Spanish National Ballet.

Guest conductors documented in connection with the NDK's concert history include Herbert von Karajan, Claudio Abbado, Riccardo Muti, Emil Tabakov, Rossen Milanov, Nayden Todorov and others.

In 2026, the NDK marked its 45th anniversary with the gala concert Symphony of Time in Hall 1. The event featured the Sofia Philharmonic Orchestra conducted by Nayden Todorov and a recital by Bulgarian singer Lili Ivanova.

According to the Bulgarian News Agency, the first part of the gala included film music by Nino Rota and Ennio Morricone, while the second part featured Lili Ivanova with her band and the Sofia Philharmonic musicians.

== Management ==
The Palace has been managed by a board of directors since May 2011.

As of 2026, the executive director of the NDK is Andriana Petkova. The board of directors includes Mariyana Arsenova-Vladimirova as chair, together with Andriana Petkova, Nina Naydenova, Emilia Petkova and Sasho Ganov.

== Floor space and facilities ==
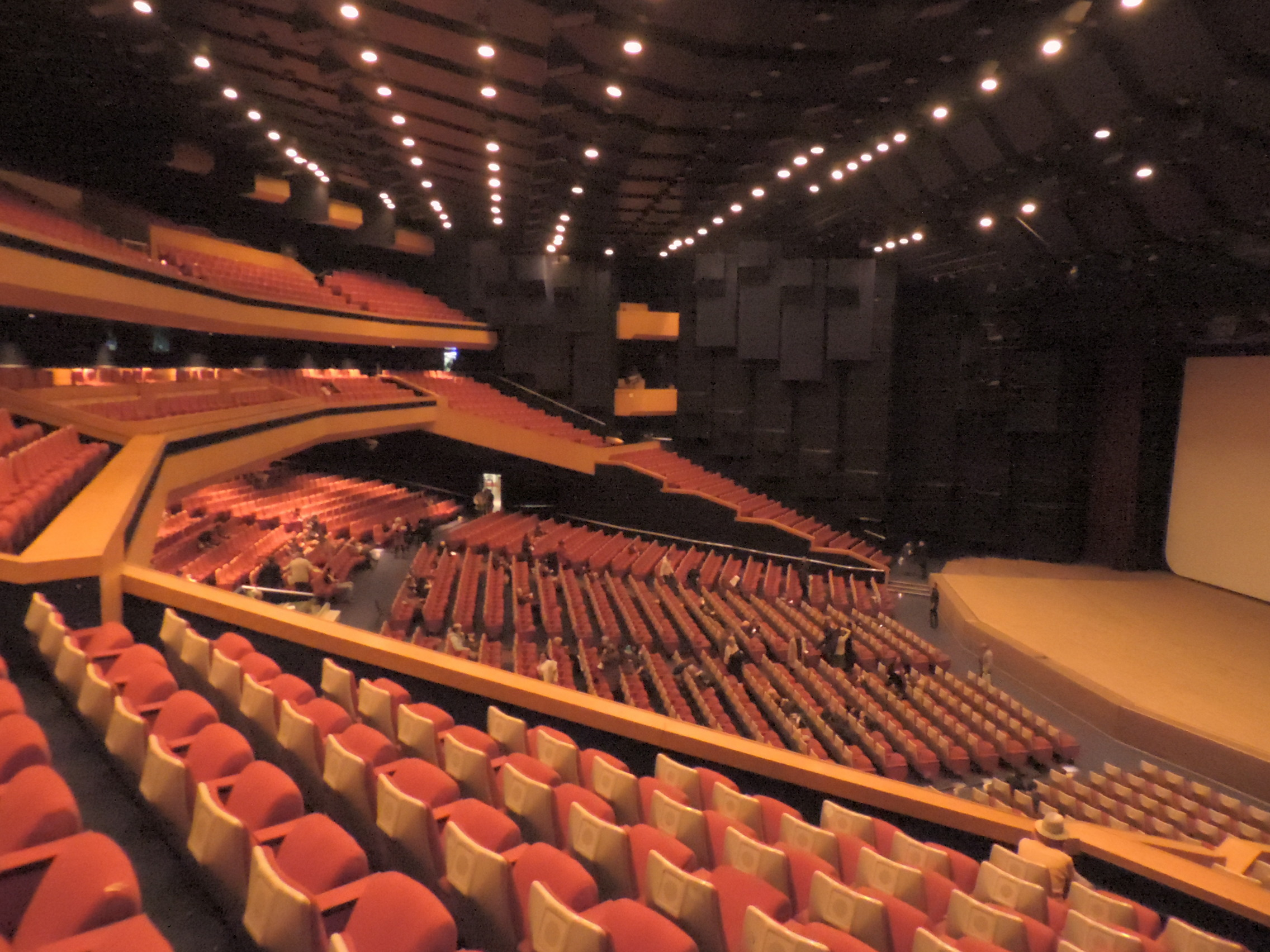
Hall 1 with 3,380 seats

The building's total functional area is 123,000 square metres, distributed over eight floors, four panoramic terraces and three underground levels.

The centre includes multiple halls for conferences, concerts, film screenings, theatre, exhibitions and festivals. Hall 1 is the largest hall in the complex and has a capacity of more than 3,000 seats.

The NDK also contains seminar rooms, exhibition spaces, lobbies, restaurants, technical facilities and equipment for conferences, concerts, recordings, simultaneous interpretation and multimedia presentations.

== Activities ==
The NDK hosts cultural, political, business and scientific events, including international conventions, political forums, business conferences, symposiums, music and film festivals, theatre performances, concerts, exhibitions and fairs.

It has hosted international forums including events connected with UNESCO, the World Health Organization, the Organization for Security and Co-operation in Europe, the Inter-Parliamentary Union, and major European and regional conferences.

The NDK is also associated with the spring and autumn editions of the International Book Fair and with large-scale cultural events, exhibitions and public programmes.

== Production and festivals ==
The Palace supports Bulgarian culture as an organiser and co-producer of festivals, exhibitions, concerts and literary events. Its cultural programme includes the Salon of the Arts, Kinomania, the New Year Music Festival and projects connected with literature, cinema, theatre, music and visual arts.

=== Salon of the Arts ===
Salon of the Arts is a multidisciplinary festival held at the NDK. It includes music, dance, theatre, cinema, literature, exhibitions and other cultural events.

=== Kinomania ===
Kinomania began in 1987 as a film-screening event presenting international films not widely distributed in Bulgaria. It takes place annually in November.

=== New Year Music Festival ===
The New Year Music Festival was inaugurated in 1986 by conductor Emil Tchakarov and takes place in December, culminating in a classical music concert on 1 January.

== Projects ==
=== National Book Centre ===
The National Book Centre at the NDK promotes Bulgarian literature, translation, publishing and international presentation of Bulgarian authors.

=== Azaryan Theater ===
The Azaryan Theater, named after Bulgarian theatre director Krikor Azaryan, opened in 2015 and functions as one of the NDK's theatre venues.

== Works of art ==
The NDK houses more than 80 monumental works of art, including paintings, mosaics, sculptures, murals, woodcarvings and metal works created especially for the building by Bulgarian artists.

In the main building there are works by Bulgarian artists such as Dechko Uzunov, Marin Varbanov, Svetlin Roussev, Pavel Koychev, Teofan Sokerov, Anton Donchev, Dimitar Kirov, Ivan Kirkov, Hristo Stefanov and others.

The palace's logo represents a phoenix and was created by Bulgarian graphic designer Stefan Kanchev.

The bronze artwork above the main entrance is by Georgi Chapkanov and represents a stylised sun. In the Palace's lobby stands the gilded sculpture Revival, also known as Mother Bulgaria, by Dimitar Boykov.

== Awards ==
- 2010: Second place at the International contest for the Apex Award by the International Association of Congress Centres
- 2009: Silver award by New European Economy magazine for best congress centre
- 2005: Apex Award for Best Convention Centre in the World by the International Association of Congress Centres
- 2003: Second place at the International contest for the Apex Award for the Best Convention Centre in the World

== International conferences ==
The centre has hosted international conferences and institutional meetings, including meetings connected with the World Health Organization, UNESCO, the Organization for Security and Co-operation in Europe, the Inter-Parliamentary Union, energy efficiency forums, regional economic forums and European institutional meetings.

== Gallery ==
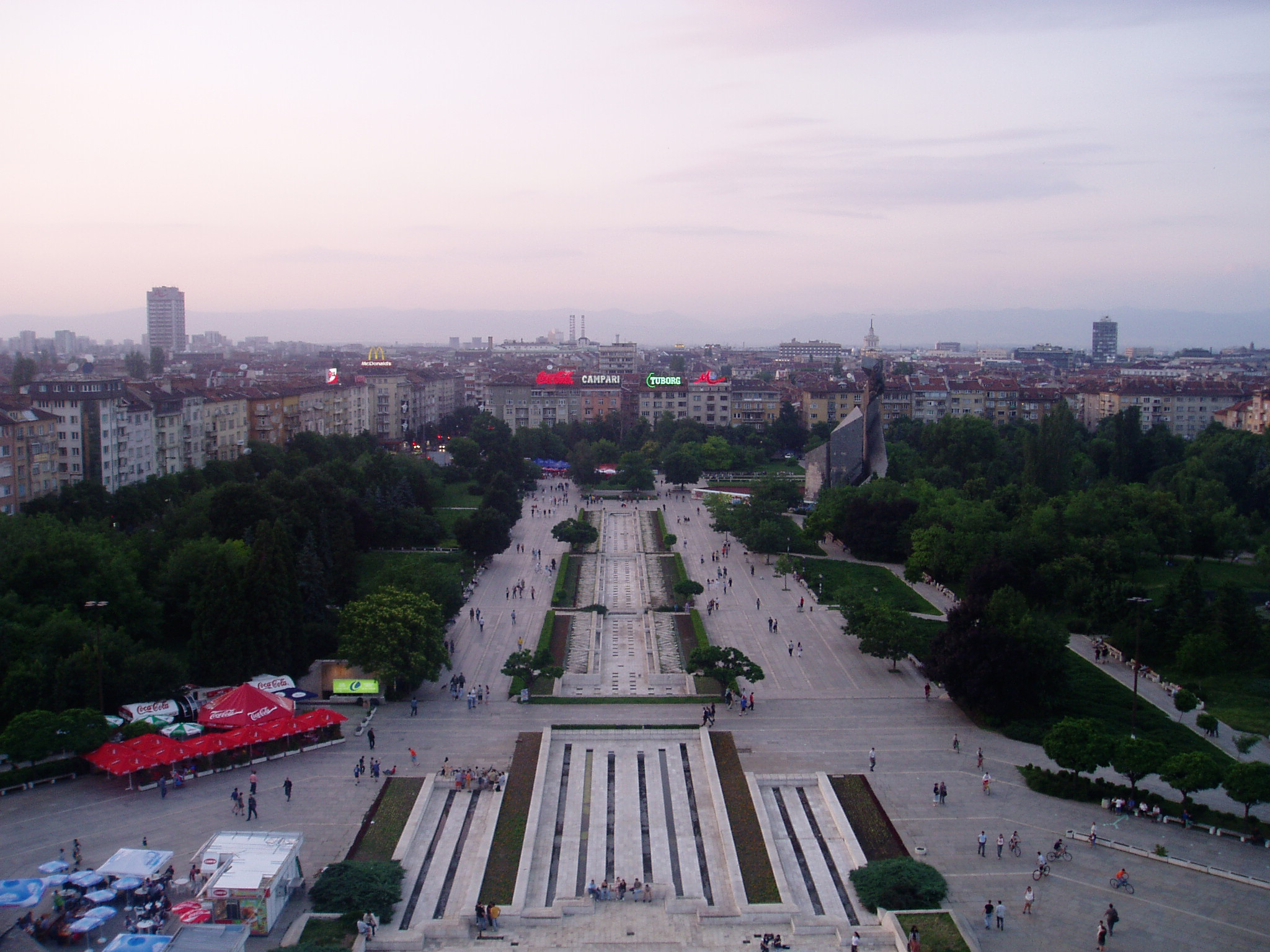
View from the Panorama Restaurant of NDK

Near view of National Palace of Culture
