= Tsar Boris III Metro Station =

Sofia metro station

Tsar Boris III Цар Борис III

General information
- Location: 1612 Lagera, Sofia
- Coordinates: 42°40′44.2″N 23°17′5.2″E
- Owner: Sofia Municipality
- Operator: Metropoliten JSC
- Platforms: side
- Tracks: 2
- Tram routes: 3
- Bus routes: 4
- Connections
- Tram: 4, 5, 15
- Bus: 63, 83, 102, 260

Construction
- Structure type: sub-surface
- Depth: 22 m (72 ft)
- Platform levels: 2
- Parking: no
- Cycle facilities: yes
- Accessible: yes
- Architect: Krasen Andreev

Other information
- Status: Staffed
- Station code: 3327; 3328
- Website: Official website

History
- Opened: 26 August 2020

Services
Preceding station	Sofia Metro	Following station
Ovcha Kupel towards Gorna Banya	M3 line	Bulgaria towards General Vladimir Vazov
Location

Tsar Boris III (Bulgarian: Цар Борис III) is a Sofia Metro station. It was opened on 26 August 2020 as Krasno Selo as part of the inaugural section of the line, from Hadzhi Dimitar to Tsar Boris III Metro Station. In 2026 it was renamed Tsar Boris III. It is located between Ovcha kupel and Bulgaria stations.

== Location ==
The station is located at the intersection of Tsar Boris III blvd. and Zhitnitsa Street in Krasno Selo microdistrict. It is 22 meters deep. Only the Orlov Most and NDK 2 stations are deeper than it on Line 3. The entrances are from the four corners of the crossroads - two on the south side of the sidewalk to Gotse Delchev blvd and two from the north - from Zhitnitsa str on the sidewalk of Tsar Boris III blvd. A large, spacious entrance hall offers magnificent views of the platform. On the ceiling above the vestibule, blue wings spread wide, creating the feeling of space, sky and flight in the heights. Road tunnel above the station in the direction of Gоtse Delchev blvd and Zhitnitsa str assists in the conflict-free crossing of cars in this direction with Tsar Boris III Blvd. All entrances to the station are equipped with 5 elevators and 9 escalators. The architect is Krasen Andreev. The layout is solved by polished granite tiles in two colors - beige and light blue in combination with a broken orange strip 1 m thick of tempered glass. 16 transparent opening partitions between the platforms and the trains are 1.6 m high with a stainless edging structure and 40 cm strips of smooth stainless steel at the bottom.
