= Gorna Banya =

Gorna Banya Горна баня
- quarter
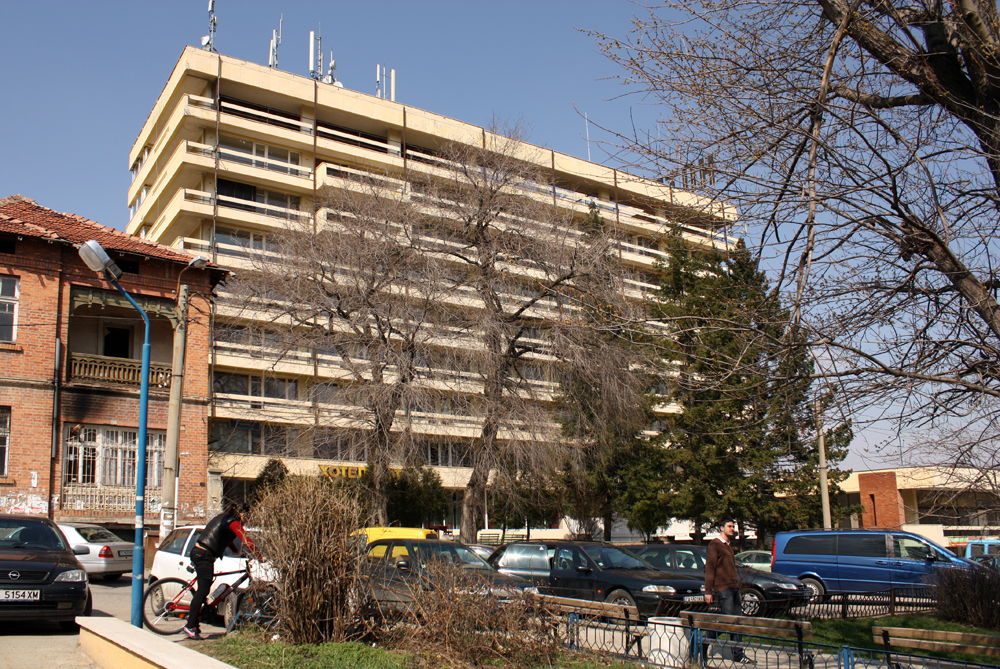
- Hotel Gorna Banya
- Interactive map of Gorna Banya
- Coordinates: 42°40′38″N 23°14′21″E
- Province: Sofia City Province
- City: Sofia

Gorna Banya (Bulgarian: Горна баня) is a neighbourhood in Sofia, the capital city of Bulgaria. It is one of the city's oldest villa zones. The town is part of Sofia's Ovcha Kupel District. It is located in the southwestern part of the capital and borders the neighbourhoods of Knyazhevo to the south and Ovcha Kupel to the northeast.

It is known for its mineral waters and has the cleanest air in Sofia due to the unique interaction between air currents from the Vladaysko Gorge, the Buchinski Pass, and the Slivnishko Pole, which are located in the Sofia Valley. This interaction provides constant ventilation and prevents the retention of fog.

== History ==
According to a local legend, the village was once desolate, but restored after the waters of the local mineral springs healed a hunting dog from the valley of Sofia.

At the beginning of the 17th century, The area was governed by Sultan Selim II's daughter, Shah Sultan. Throughout the 18th and 19th centuries, a group of thirty-four families lived in the rural municipality. Much of the upkeep of the mineral spring was overseen by these families. Use of the forest and other land, including for cattle grazing, was overseen by the Bozhkov family.

On 11 April 1938 Gorna Banya became a district of Sofia and the population grew to 3100 people.

== 9th Tank Brigade ==
The 9th Tank Brigade of the Bulgarian Land Forces was stationed in Gorna Banya for many years. According to retired colonel Yanko Roshkev, who commanded the brigade in the late 1980s and early 1990s, it had a total of 182 tanks in three tank battalions. Each of these possessed its own tank company of ten MBTs each, plus a tank company of thirteen tanks for the security of the General Staff Building in Sofia, and two tanks at the brigade's headquarters for the commanding and executive officers.
