= Gorna Banya Metro Station =

Sofia metro station

Gorna Banya Горна баня
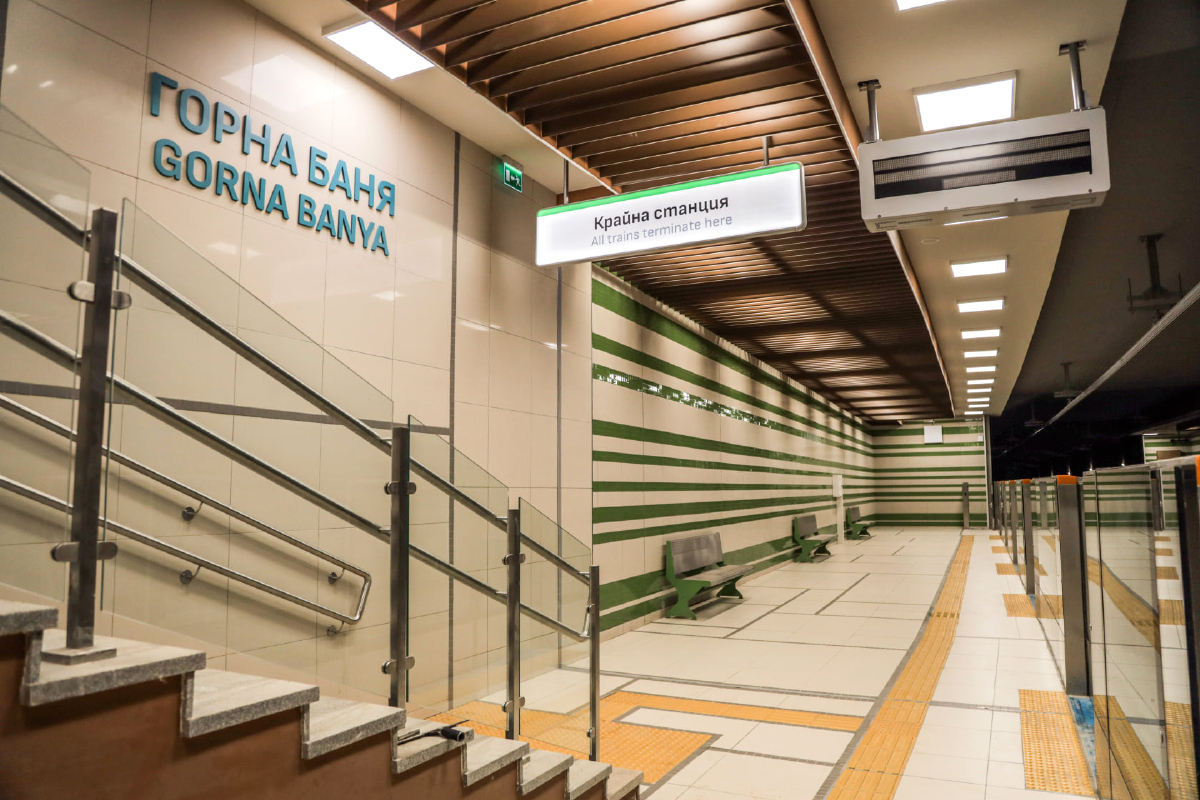

General information
- Location: 1632 Ovcha Kupel 2, Sofia
- Coordinates: 42°40′57″N 23°14′28″E
- Owner: Sofia Municipality
- Operator: Metropoliten JSC
- Platforms: side
- Tracks: 2
- Bus routes: 6
- Connections
- Bus: 11, 60, 73, 102, 107, 111

Construction
- Structure type: sub-surface
- Platform levels: 2
- Parking: yes
- Cycle facilities: no
- Accessible: elevators

Other information
- Status: Staffed
- Station code: 3335; 3336
- Website: Official website

History
- Opened: 24 April 2021

Services
| Preceding station | Sofia Metro | Following station |
|---|---|---|
| Terminus | M3 line | Ovcha Kupel II towards General Vladimir Vazov |
Location

Gorna Banya (Bulgarian: Метростанция "Горна баня") is a Sofia Metro station on the M3 line. It was opened on 24 April 2021 as part of the second section of the line, from Ovcha Kupel to Gorna Banya, and serves as the southwest terminus of the M3 line. The adjacent station is Ovcha Kupel II.

== Location ==
The station is located at Boycho Boychev str. in the northmost part of the Ovcha Kupel 2 microdistrict. It is also close to the recently built Gorna banya train stop, which was built especially because of the metro station itself.

== Interchange with other public transport ==
• City Bus service: 11, 60, 73, 102, 107, 111
