= Ovcha kupel =

District of Stolichna Municipality, Bulgaria

Coordinates: 42°40′59″N 23°14′35″E

Ovcha kupel Овча купел
- District of Sofia
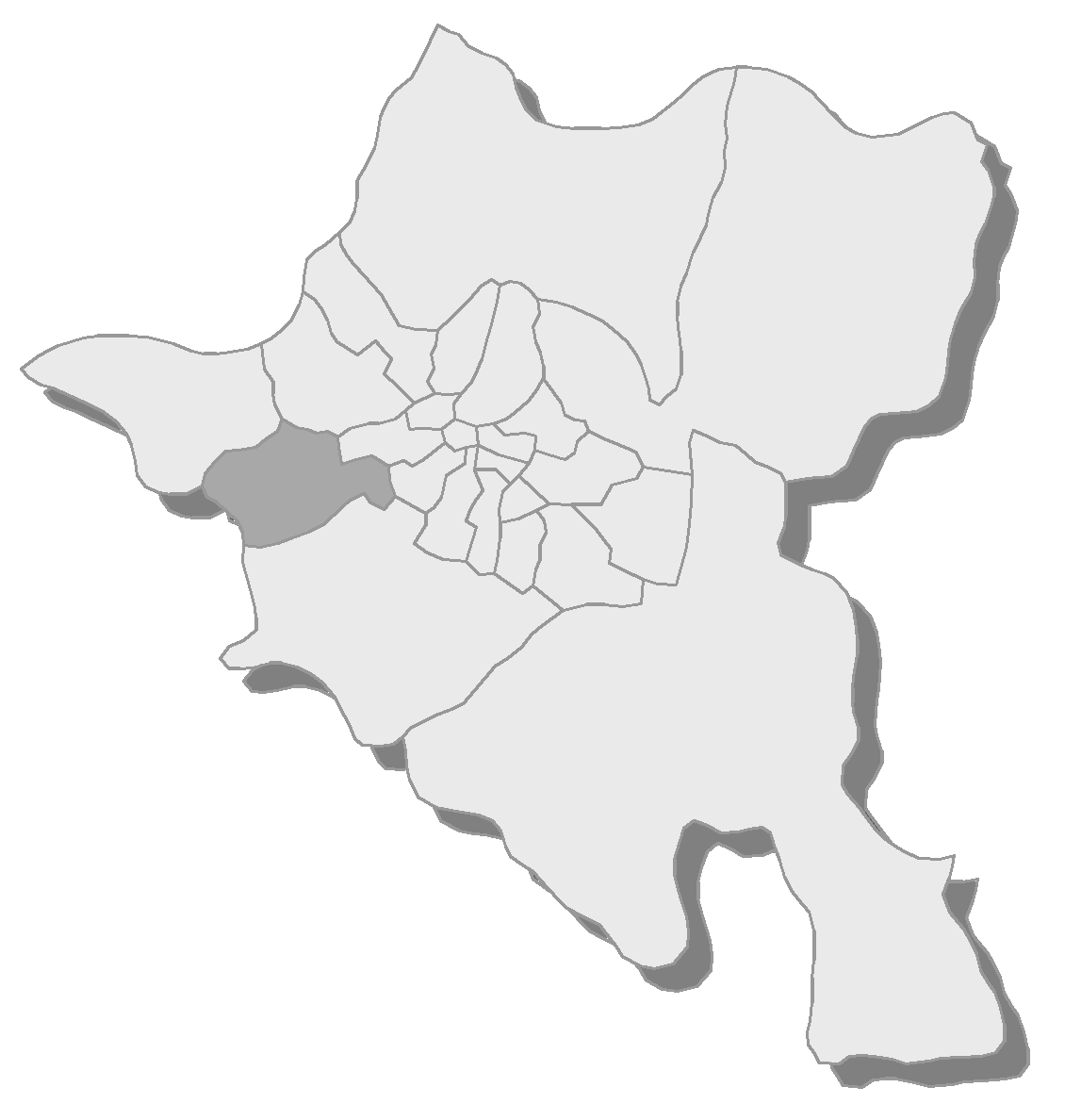
- Location of Ovcha kupel in Sofia Municipality
- Country: Bulgaria
- Province: Sofia City
- Municipality: Stolichna

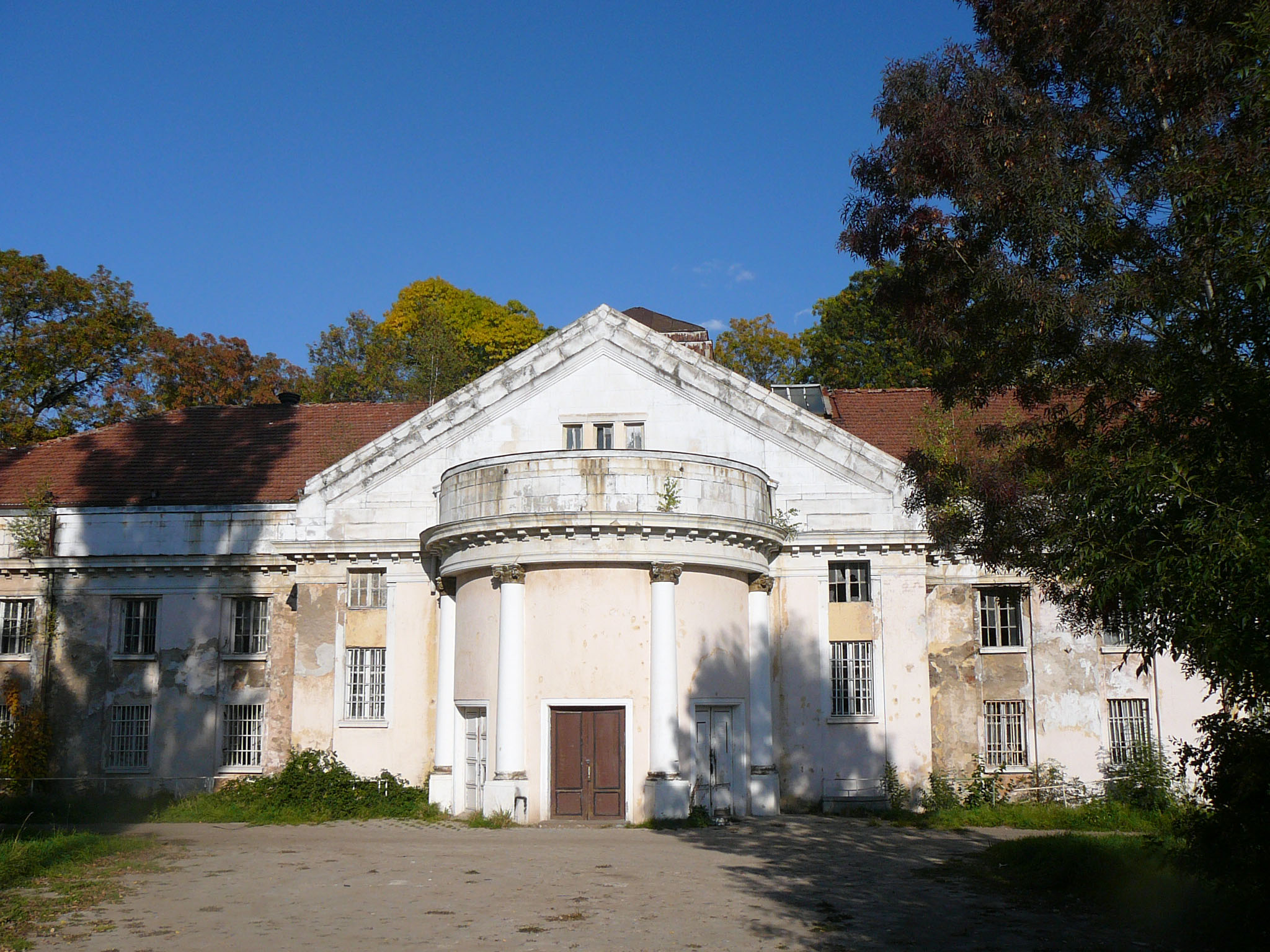
Ovcha kupel Mineral Bath

Ovcha kupel (Bulgarian: Овча купел [ˌɔft͡ʃɐ ˈkupɛɫ]) is a district (rayon) of the Stolichna Municipality of Sofia City Province, Bulgaria.

The name of the neighborhood is applied to the thermal water that comes out on the earth's surface: shepherds who led their flocks there knew that the sheep willingly walk in the swampy meadows. After an earthquake in 1858, hot water gushed out and the sheep did not avoid it and were like bathed, hence the name, literally means "sheep bath" (ovcha kupel). On that place in 1933 was opened the Ovcha kupel Mineral Bath, built in 1925-1928 by architect Georgi Ovcharov.

As of 2006, it has 47,380 inhabitants. It is located starting at 6 km to the south-west of the city centre of Sofia, including the eastern part of the Lyulin Mountain. The district includes some neighborhoods of Sofia – Ovcha kupel, Gorna banya, Suhodol, Karpuzitsa, and the village of Malo Buchino.

In the district are situated 3 institutions of higher education:

- Specialized Establishment of the Francophonie for Administration and Management;
- New Bulgarian University (with more than 7,000 students);
- Higher School of Insurance and Finance.

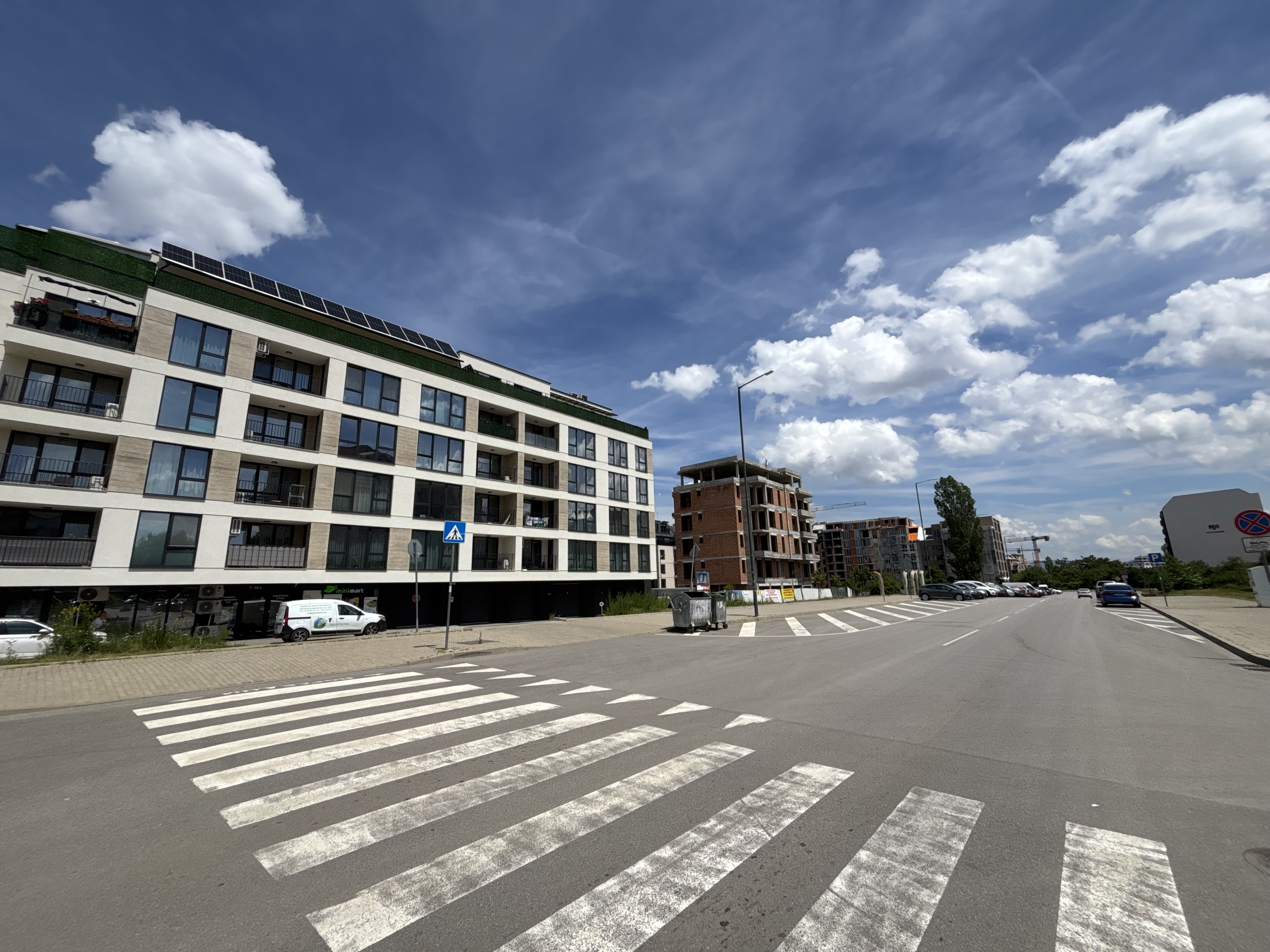
Ovcha Kupel

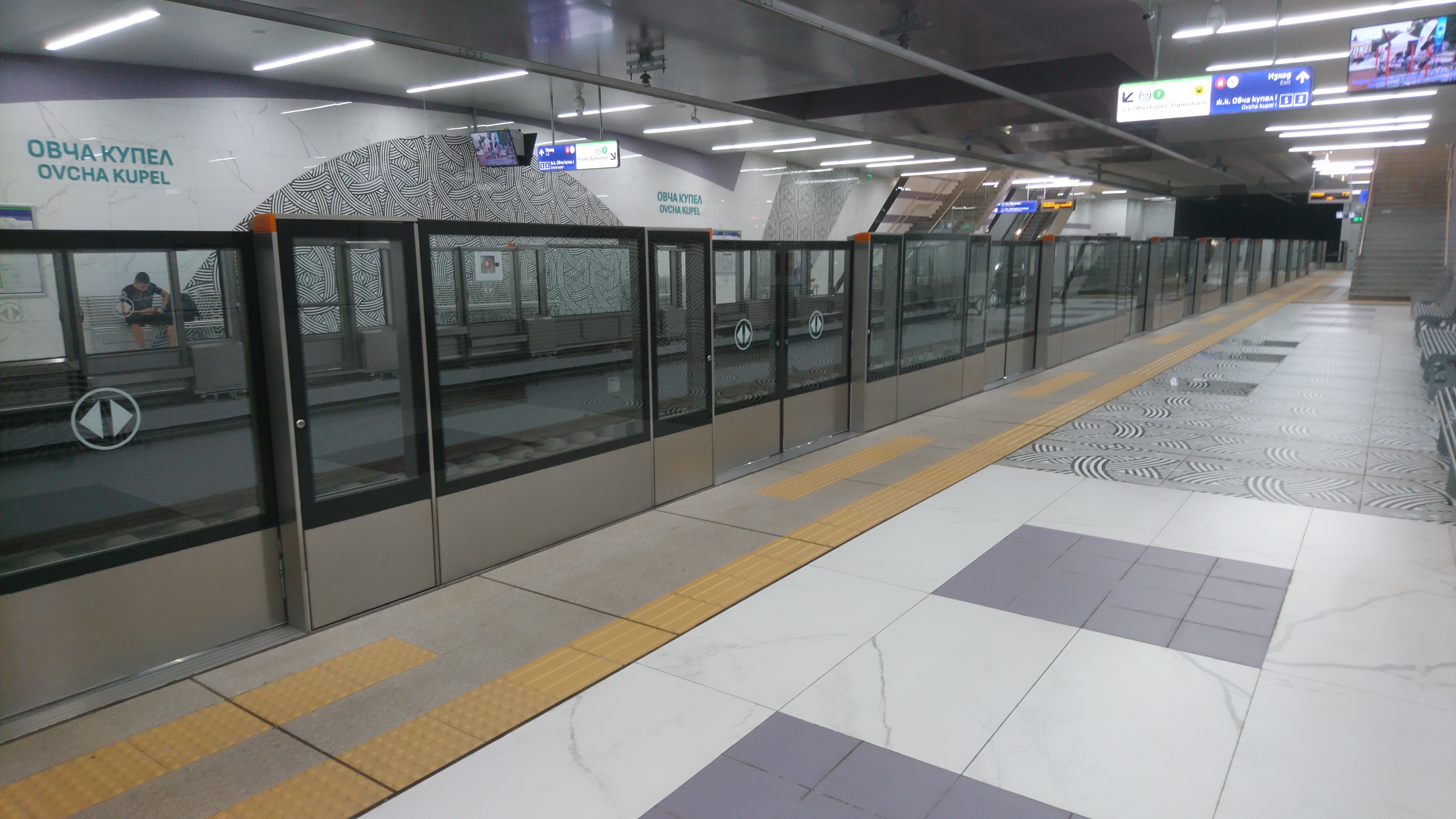
Metro Ovcha Kupel 2

There are 9 schools (including the National educational complex in culture) and 5 houses of culture called chitalishte, the oldest of them built in 1922. The district is home of Slavia – the oldest football club in Sofia, among the oldest in the country with a 25,556-seater stadium.
