= Stadion Balgarska Armia =

Football stadium in Sofia, Bulgaria

- UEFA
- Interactive map of Stadion Balgarska Armia
- Full name: Bulgarian Army Stadium
- Former names: Atletik Park (1923–1944); Stadion Chavdar (1944–1948); Narodna Armia (1948–1990); Balgarska Armia (1990–)
- Location: Sofia, Bulgaria
- Coordinates: 42°41′3″N 23°20′23″E
- Owner: Ministry of Youth and Sports (50%); CSKA Sofia (50%)
- Operator: CSKA Sofia
- Capacity: 18,540 (domestic competitions); 16,819 (european competitions)
- Executive suites: 20 skybox
- Surface: GrassMaster
- Field size: 105m x 68m
- Public transit: SU St. Kliment Ohridski;Vasil Levski Stadium; Orlov Most, buses, trolleybuses

Construction
- Built: 1965; 2024–2026
- Opened: 1967; 2026
- Renovated: 1982, 1997, 2001, 2015, 2016
- Closed: 2023
- Demolished: 14 May 2024
- Cost: c. 90 million BGN (€45 million)
- Architects: Anton Karavelov, Simeon Ivanov; IPA - Architecture and more (new ground)
- Main contractor: Glavbolgarstroy Holding JSC (new ground)

Tenants
- OSK AS-23 (1923–1944); Chavdar Sofia (1944–1948); CSKA Sofia (1948–2023); (2026–)

Website
- www.balgarskaarmiya.com

Stadion Balgarska Armia (Bulgarian: Стадион „Българска Армия“, lit. ''Bulgarian Army Stadium'') is an all-covered stadium in Sofia, Bulgaria, home of the Bulgarian football club CSKA Sofia. It is situated in the Borisova gradina in the centre of Sofia. The stadium has a domestic league capacity of 18 540 spectators (seated and standing) and an international competitions capacity of 16 819 (seated only).

The stadium consists of 4 main stands (sectors A, B, V and G) - all of them covered by a roof, with the following capacity:

- Sector G: 5617 standing (4835 foldable seats)
- Sector V: 4742 seats
- Sector A: 2841 seats
- Sector B (home team): 3482 seats
- Sector B (away team, sections B6 and B7): 1858 standing (1042 foldable seats)

The stadium features 2 video boards (one at each side of the venue), a 400-meter LED ribbon board and food&drinks facilities in every sector. On the façade of the ultras Sector G, there's an outside video screen in front of a renovated amphitheatre (built where the old stadium's sector G used to be) where fans outside the stadium can watch certain games together.

The stadium also hosts the CSKA Sofia Glory Museum, the club's official fanshop and The Army restaurant.

== History ==
Built in 1923 for AS-23, the stadium was known as Athletic Park until 1944, when AS-23 merged with two other clubs to form Chavdar Sofia. From 1944 until 1948 it was called Chavdar Stadium. Between 1948 and 1990 it was the People's Army Stadium, and since 1990 it is the Balgarska Armia Stadium. The current structure was built by architect Anton Karavelov in the period between 1965 and 1967 on the old grounds of AS-23. It was reconstructed again in 1982, which included the introduction of floodlights.

In 2000, the stadium was equipped with a new Dynacord surround sound system, capable of 48 kilowatts and 107 decibels. The electric lighting is also of the latest generation and is covering the pitch with 2100 lux.

Despite the improvements over the years, parts of the stadium were in a deteriorating condition, especially sector B, which has been completely closed down for spectators and covered with advertising instead, in order to hide the growing plant and fungal life underneath. The seating of the stadium was also in a poor condition, with many seats being either partially broken or missing completely, with the main cause abdication of the state that owned the facility until 2023.

Until 2024 the stadium had four sectors and a total of 22,995 (18,495) seats, of which 2,100 were covered; the pitch length was 106 meters and the width was 66 meters.

The capacity of the old stadium was divided in four sectors:

- Sector A: 6417 seats
- Sector B: 4889 seats
- Sector V: 5689 seats
- Sector G: 6000 (1500 seats)

The sports complex also included tennis courts, a basketball court, and gymnastics facilities.

In late 2023, the stadium was closed to undergo a complete reconstruction. The project involved demolishing the existing stands and rebuilding the venue as a football-specific stadium, with the athletics track removed. During the process, CSKA played their home games at the Vasil Levski National Stadium, situated only a couple of hundred meters away from Bulgarska Armia. The stadium was demolished in 2024 and construction of the new 18,540-seat venue began at the same site.

The last game on the old stadium was held on 10 December 2023, between CSKA and Ludogorets Razgrad, ending in a 0-1 loss for CSKA. After the match, the fans were allowed to take a piece of the stadium as a memory from the venue before demolition begins.

== Reconstruction ==
In 2023, CSKA Sofia and the Bulgarian Ministry of Youth and Sports, joint owners of Stadion Balgarska Armia, established a dedicated joint venture to carry out a full reconstruction of the stadium. The new stadium is designed to include 18 540 seats and conform to UEFA Category 4 stadium requirements.

A full construction permit was granted by the Sofia municipality in October 2023. The final competitive match at the old stadium took place in December 2023, after which the facility was closed. Demolition of the 1967 structure began in spring 2024 and was completed by late May 2024.

On 19 September 2024, CSKA Sofia announced the signing of a construction contract with Glavbolgarstroy Holding JSC, one of Bulgaria’s largest construction companies. The main construction period is expected to last 18 months, with completion projected for spring 2026. Architectural design and planning were provided by IPA – Architecture and More, whose concept converts the former multi-use stadium into a compact, football-specific structure with stands positioned much closer to the pitch.

The new stadium would include: UEFA Category: 4 full compliance with capacity of approx. 18 540 seats, football-specific, no athletics track, single-tier seating bowl surrounding the pitch, continuous roof covering all spectator areas.

Facilities: expanded hospitality zones, media and broadcast areas, upgraded player facilities, and improved accessibility Technical elements include a hybrid-turf pitch with under-soil heating, a modern drainage system, advanced irrigation, and water-recycling capabilities.

Sustainability measures integrated into the project include: Rainwater harvesting systems. Solar panel installations. LED lighting and energy-efficient systems. Prefabricated structural elements to reduce environmental impact.

On 9 December 2024, the first two reinforced-concrete columns for the new stadium were transported from Pazardzhik to the construction site. Each column measures 24 metres in length and weighs 62 tonnes. These were the first of 54 structural roof-support elements to be installed and marked the start of the vertical construction phase.

The redevelopment represents a transformation of one of Bulgaria’s most historically significant football grounds, replacing the aging mid-20th-century structure with a modern, sustainable, football-specific facility built to contemporary international standards.

Construction of the stadium was completed in the autumn of 2026. The first football match was played on 31 October, ending in a 0–0 draw against Slavia Sofia.

== Transport ==
Bulgarian Army Stadium is located in the centre of Sofia, Bulgaria. The stadium can be approached by Sofia Metro Line 1, 3 and 4. The nearest Metro station is called Vasil Levski. There are also several paid parking lots in the area, which are of the closed type. The paid car zone in the centre area works every day, except Sundays.

Service	Station/Stop	Line/Route	Walking distance from stadium
Sofia Metro	Vasil Levski	Red	500 m 7 mins
Sofia Metro	Vasil Levski	Yellow	500 m 7 mins
Sofia Metro	Orlov Most	Green	700 m 10 mins
Sofia Public Bus	Graf Ignatiev	72; 76; 204; 304; 604	700 m 10 mins
Sofia Public Bus	Orlov Most Square	76; 84; 184; 204; 213; 280; 304; 604; N1 (night)	600 m 8 mins
Sofia Public Trolleybuses	Orlov Most Square	3; 4; 5; 11	600 m 8 mins

== Statistics ==
As of 31 October 2026

Match	P	W	D	L	GD
Domestic	1	0	1	0	0
European	0	0	0	0	0
Friendly	0	0	0	0	0
Total	1	0	1	0	0

Top-scorer: TBA

== See also ==
- List of football stadiums in Bulgaria
- Lists of stadiums
