= Eagles' Bridge, Sofia =

Eagles' Bridge Орлов мост
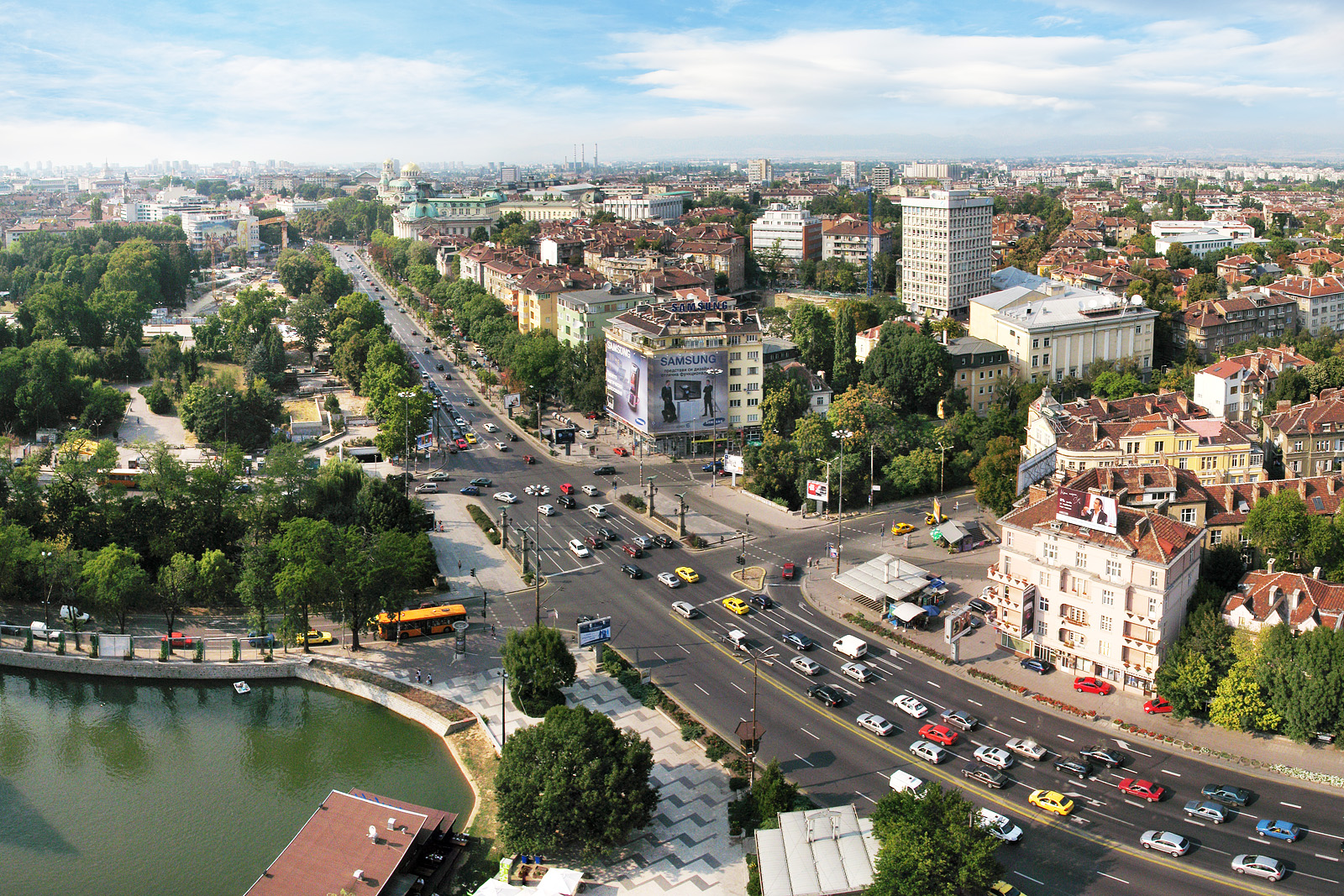
- Aerial view of Eagles' Bridge Square
- Coordinates: 42°41′26″N 23°20′15″E
- Carries: Pedestrian
- Crosses: Perlovska river
- Locale: Sofia, Bulgaria
- Owner: Stolichna Municipality

History
- Designer: Václav Prošek
- Constructed by: Jiri Prošek; Bogdan Prošek
- Construction end: 1891
- Construction cost: 80 000 leva

Eagles' Bridge (Bulgarian: Орлов мост, Orlov most) is a bridge over the Perlovska River in downtown Sofia, capital of Bulgaria. The bridge and junction where it is located, sometimes referred to as Ploshtad Orlov Most (Orlov Most Square) are usually referred simply as Eagles' Bridge (Orlov most).

The name of the bridge itself comes from the four statues of eagles on it, which are, symbolically, its protectors and patrons.

Eagles' Bridge and the junction are located in the immediate proximity of the Vasil Levski National Stadium, the Monument to the Soviet Army, the Borisova gradina park and Lake Ariana, and near Sofia University. Two main boulevards cross there – Evlogi Georgiev Boulevard, which follows the Perlovska river, and Tsarigradsko Shose, and Tsar Ivan Asen II Street terminates there. For the traffic entering Sofia from the southeast by Tsarigradsko shose, Eagles' Bridge is the first junction and the point from where the city centre is accessed.

The bridge was constructed in 1891 by Czech architect Václav Prošek, his brother Jozef and his cousins Bohdan and Jiří. They also designed together and built the Lions' Bridge at the northern point of entry to central Sofia in 1889. The cost of the entire construction of the bridge was 80,000 golden leva.

One of the bridge's columns and bronze eagles are depicted on the reverse print of Bulgarian 20 levs banknote, issued in 1999 and 2007.

The place is often a site of protests. Orlov Most was the focus of 2012 ecological protests against construction on Vitosha mountain and on the Dyuni nature spot on the Black Sea coast. The bridge was also a major focus of political protests in 2013, with scenes of violence during the winter protests, contrasted with massive but peaceful gatherings during the summer protests, when it would close every evening while protesters gathered there until late into the night. In the 2020–2021 Bulgarian protests, the bridge was repeatedly blocked by protesters with barricades and tents camps were established.

Since 2009, Eagles' Bridge has been serviced by the Sofia University Metro Station of Sofia Metro M1 line. The M3 line Orlov most Metro Station was opened in August 2020.

== Gallery ==
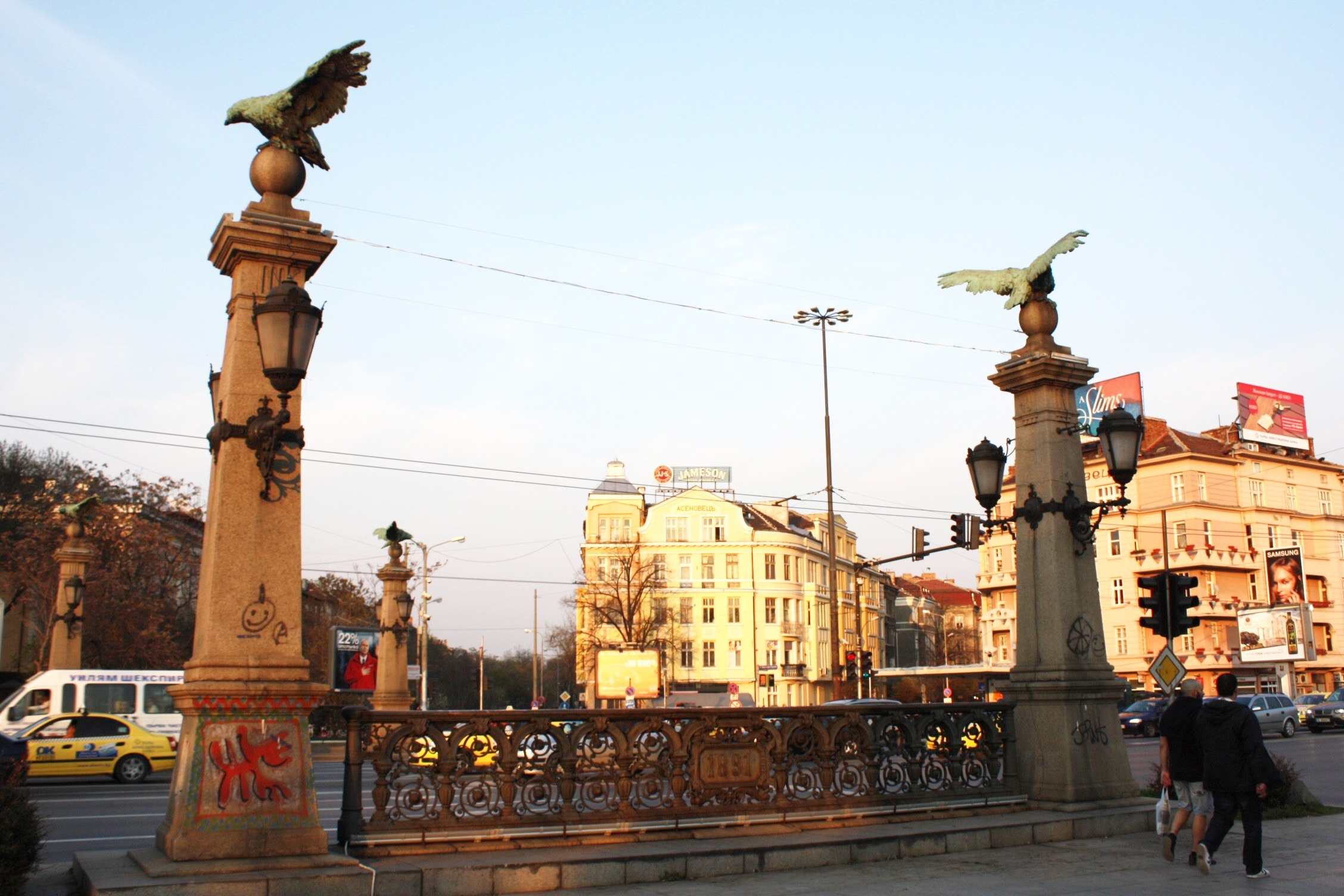
Eagle's Bridge in Sofia

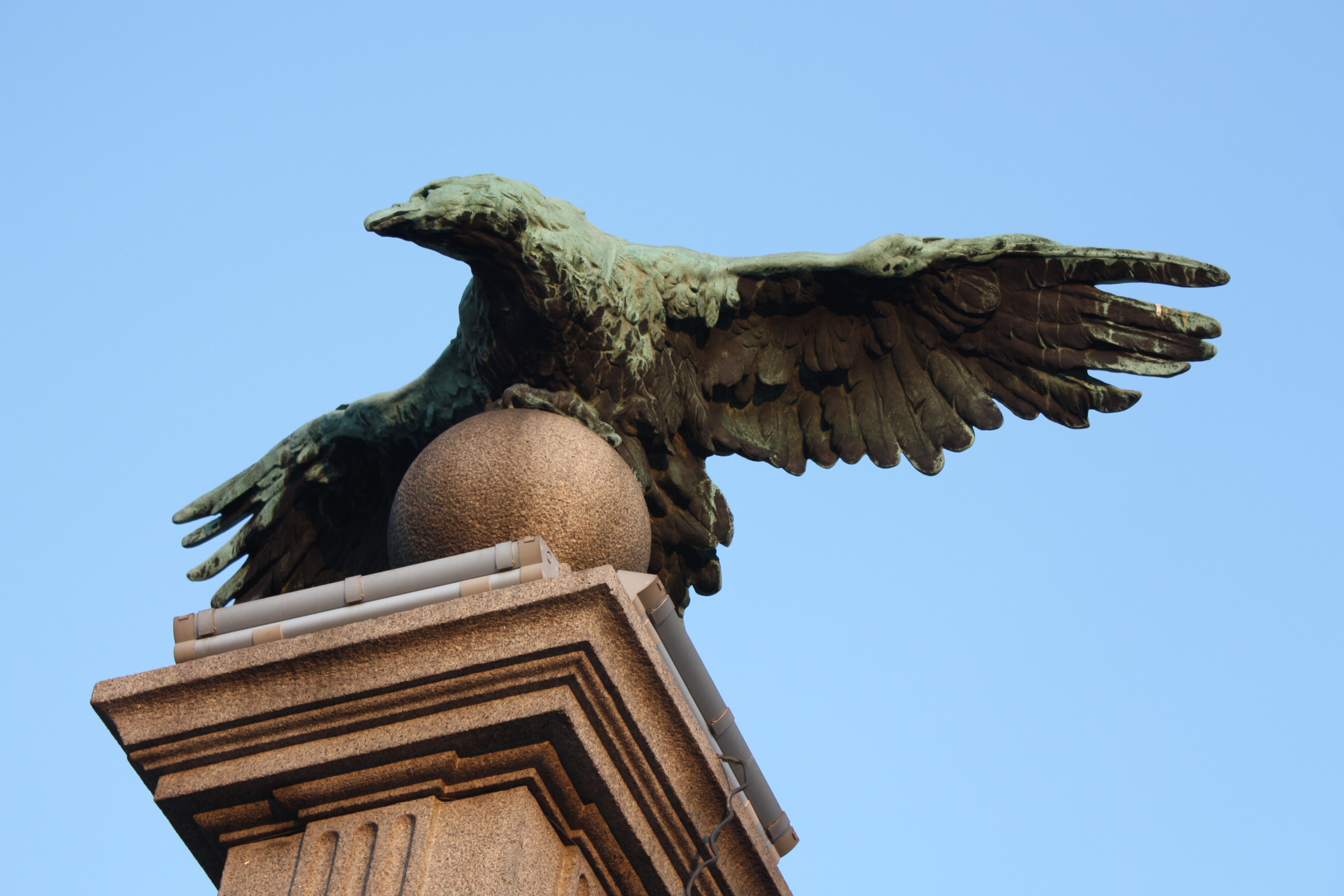
Close-up of one of the eagles

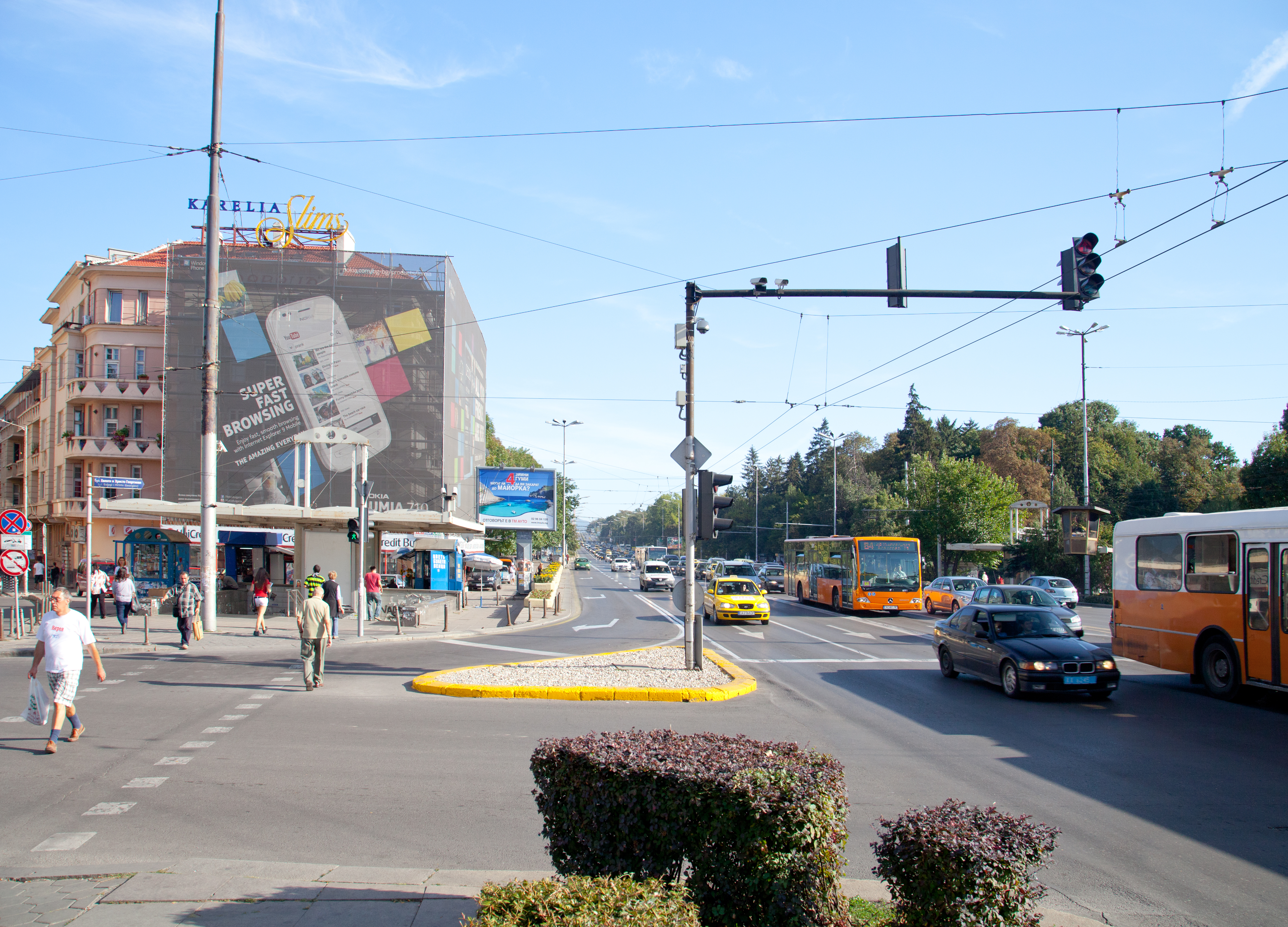
The beginning of Tsarigradsko shose at Orlov most

== See also ==
- Lions' Bridge, Sofia
