= Tsarigradsko shose =

Boulevard in Sofia, Bulgaria

Tsarigradsko shose Blvd
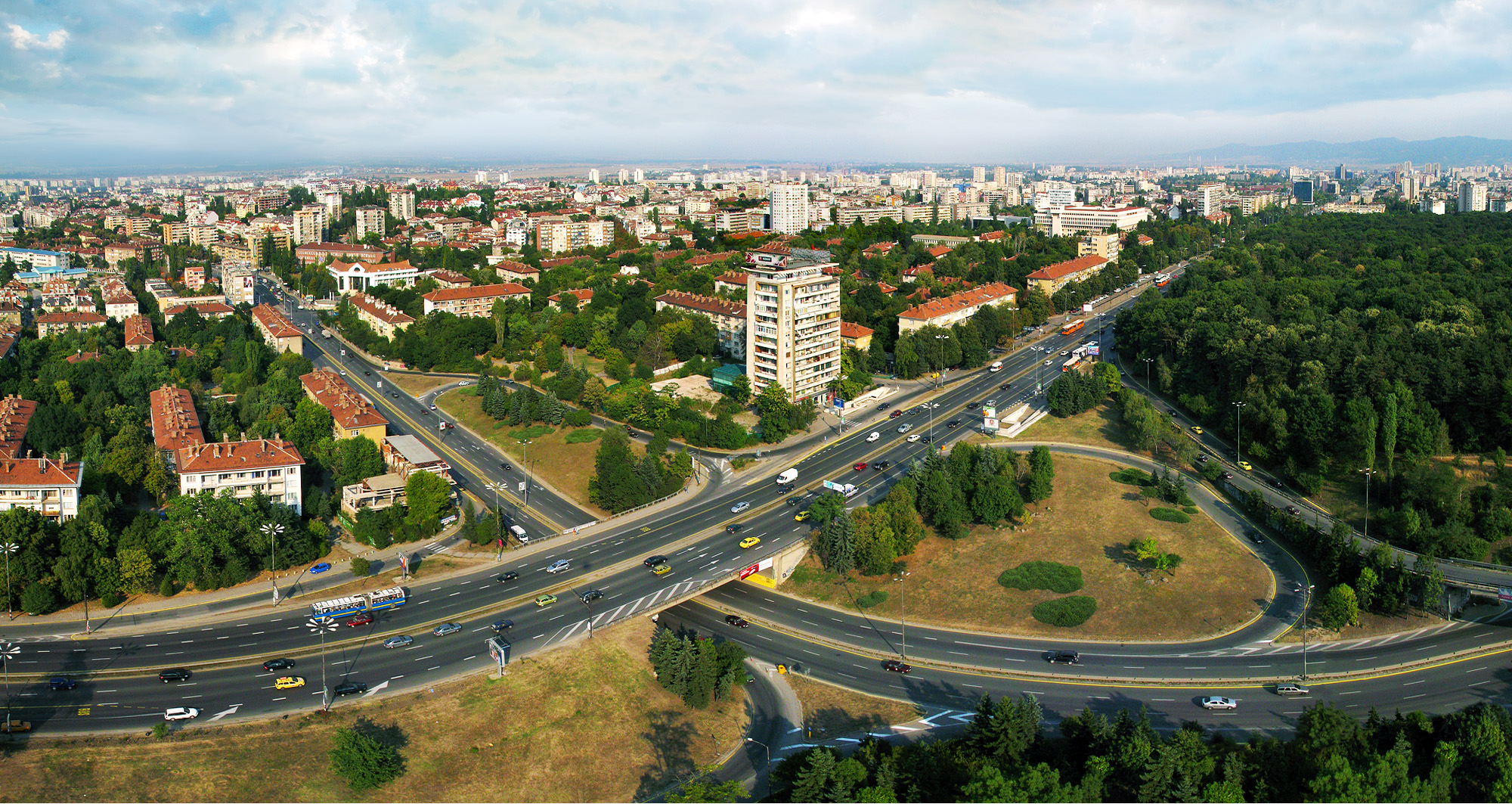
- Interactive map of Tsarigradsko shose Blvd
- Former names: Vladimir Ilyich Lenin Blvd, Trakia Blvd
- Length: 11.4 km (7.1 mi)
- Width: 37 m
- Location: Sofia
- Coordinates: 42°39′43″N 23°22′39″E
- West end: Orlov most
- Major junctions: Yavorov, Aviation Sq, Sofia Airport / Mladost, Gorublyane / Druzhba
- East end: Sofia ring road

Tsarigradsko shose (Bulgarian: Цариградско шосе, lit. 'Tsarigrad (Istanbul) Chausseé (Road)') is the largest boulevard in the capital of Bulgaria, Sofia. The boulevard provides grade-separated dual carriageway in almost its entire length of 11.4 km, running from the north-west to the south-east. It begins in the city center, at Orlov Most (Eagle's Bridge), before which it is called Tsar Osvoboditel Boulevard. In its east end, at the Sofia Ring Road, the boulevard becomes part of the Trakia motorway (A1). The maximum allowed speed on Tsarigradsko shose is 80 km/h between Orlov Most and Gorublyane neighbourhood.

The road is part of the historical Via Militaris, and in the past it was known as Tsarigradski pat (drum), and within Sofia as "V. I. Lenin" Blvd. and "Trakiya" Blvd.

To the south the boulevard borders with Sofia's largest park, the Borisova Gradina, which hosts the Vasil Levski National Stadium and Bulgarian Army Stadium. A number of departments of the Bulgarian Academy of Sciences are situated along the road in the area of the Fourth Kilometer Square, as well as the Ministry of Foreign Affairs, the Polygraphic plant, Arena Armeec, Sofia Tech Park and several hotels including the emblematic Pliska Hotel. In the outskirts of the city there are a lot of hypermarkets and office buildings constructed along the boulevard. Reconstruction and resurfacing are ongoing since 2013 to improve safety and comfort.

On April 25, 2012, Tsarigradsko shose Metro Station started operation with large underground park-and-ride. Nearby the metro station, is located the neighborhood of Sofia Skyscraper Center - a cluster of high-rise buildings, including Capital Fort (completed in 2015) and Sky Fort (completed in 2026).

The boulevard bears the old Bulgarian name of the city of Istanbul (medieval Constantinople), Tsarigrad, as it leads southeastwards out of the city, towards Plovdiv and Istanbul.

== Gallery ==
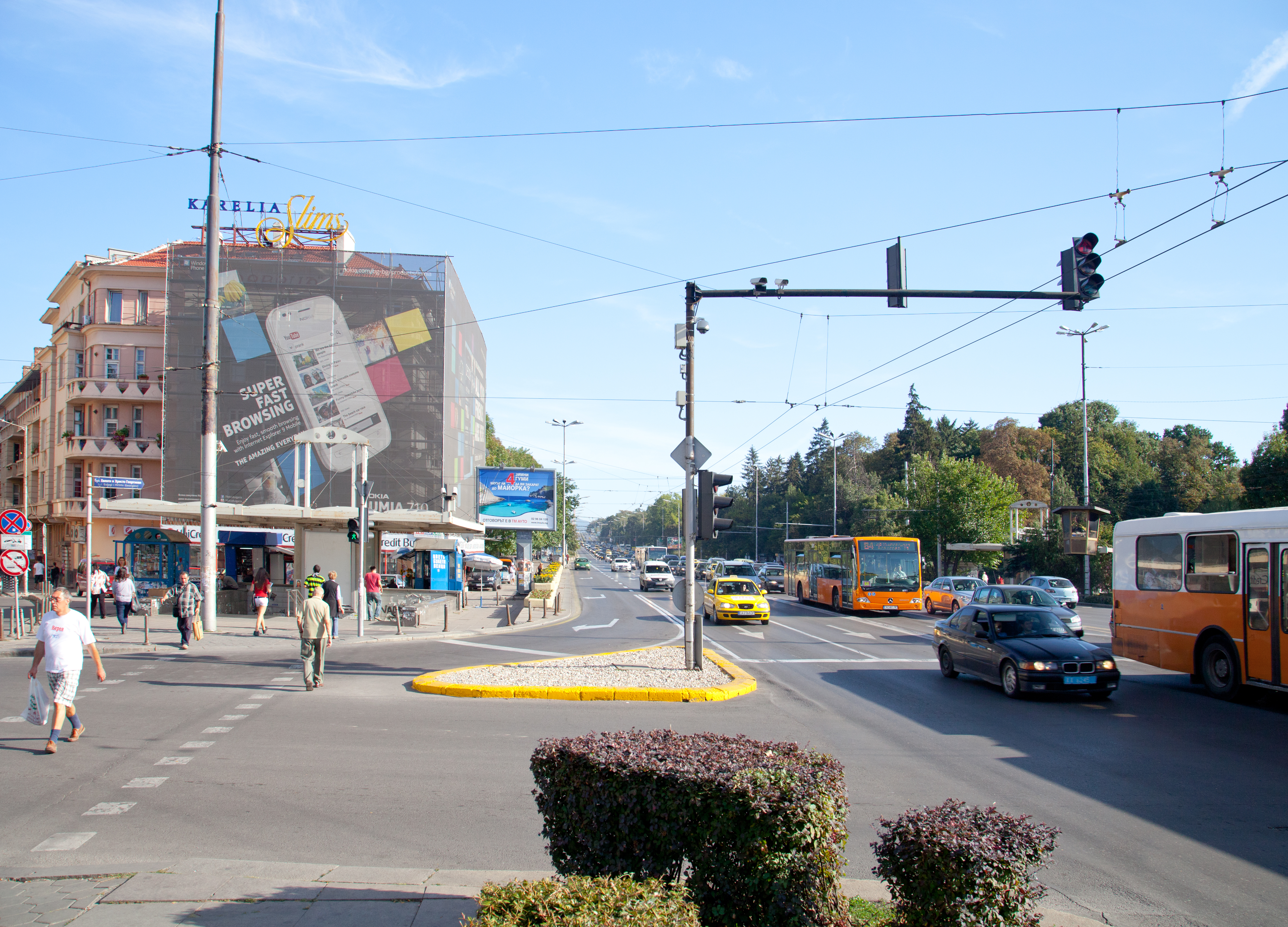
The beginning of Tsarigradsko shose at Orlov most

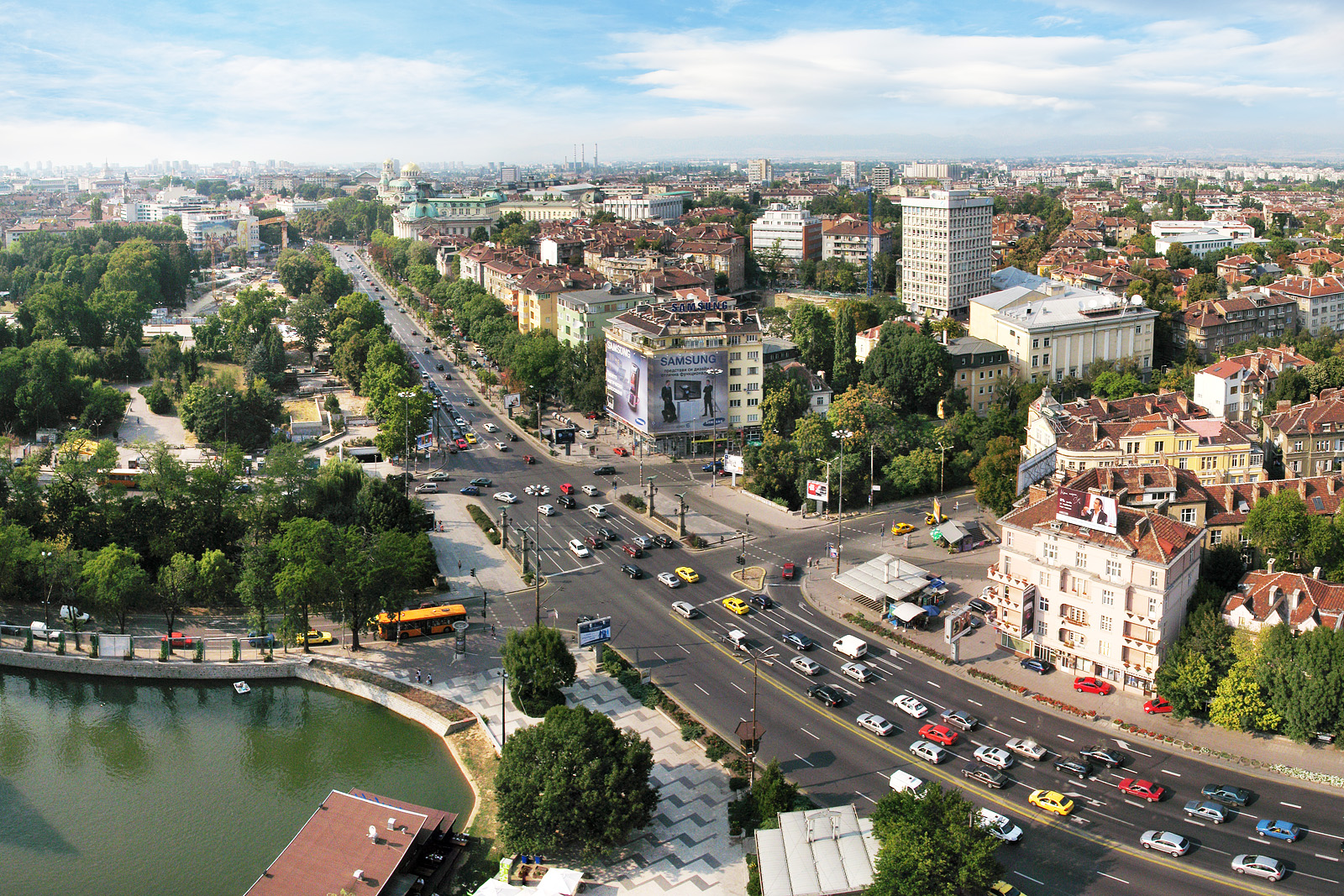
Tsarigradsko shose near Orlov Most

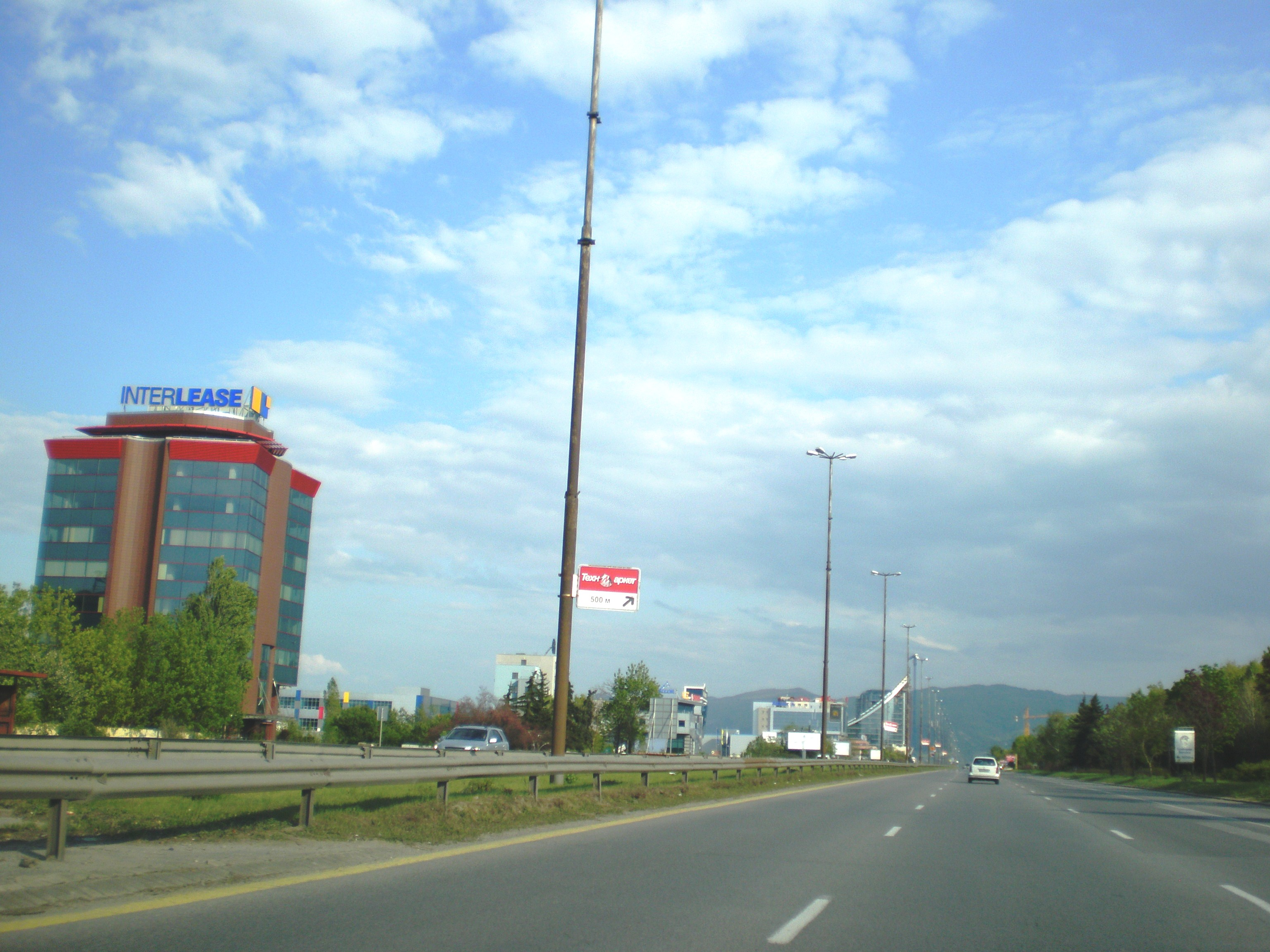
The eastern part of Tsarigradsko shose

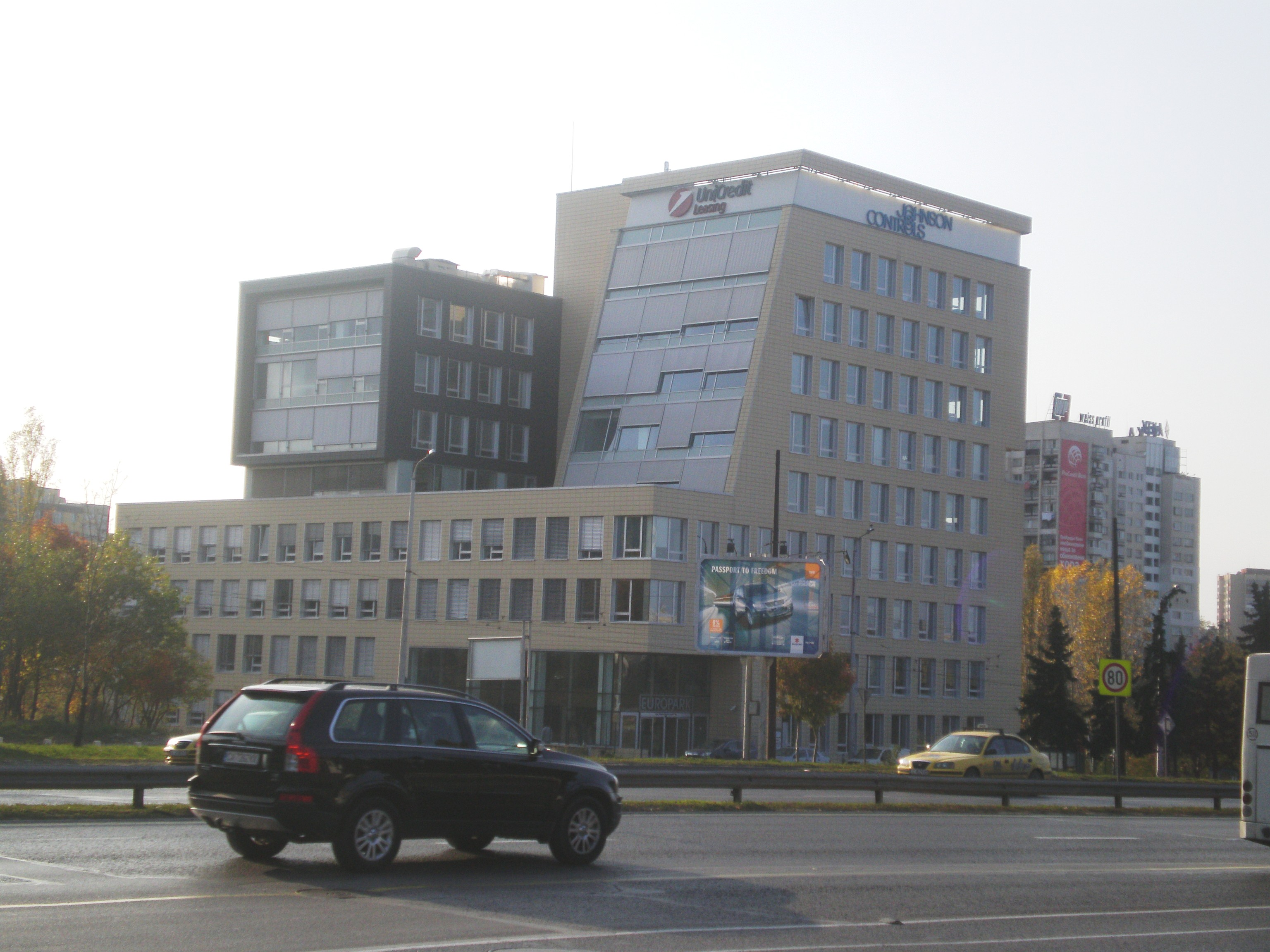
Tsarigradsko shose near Mladost district

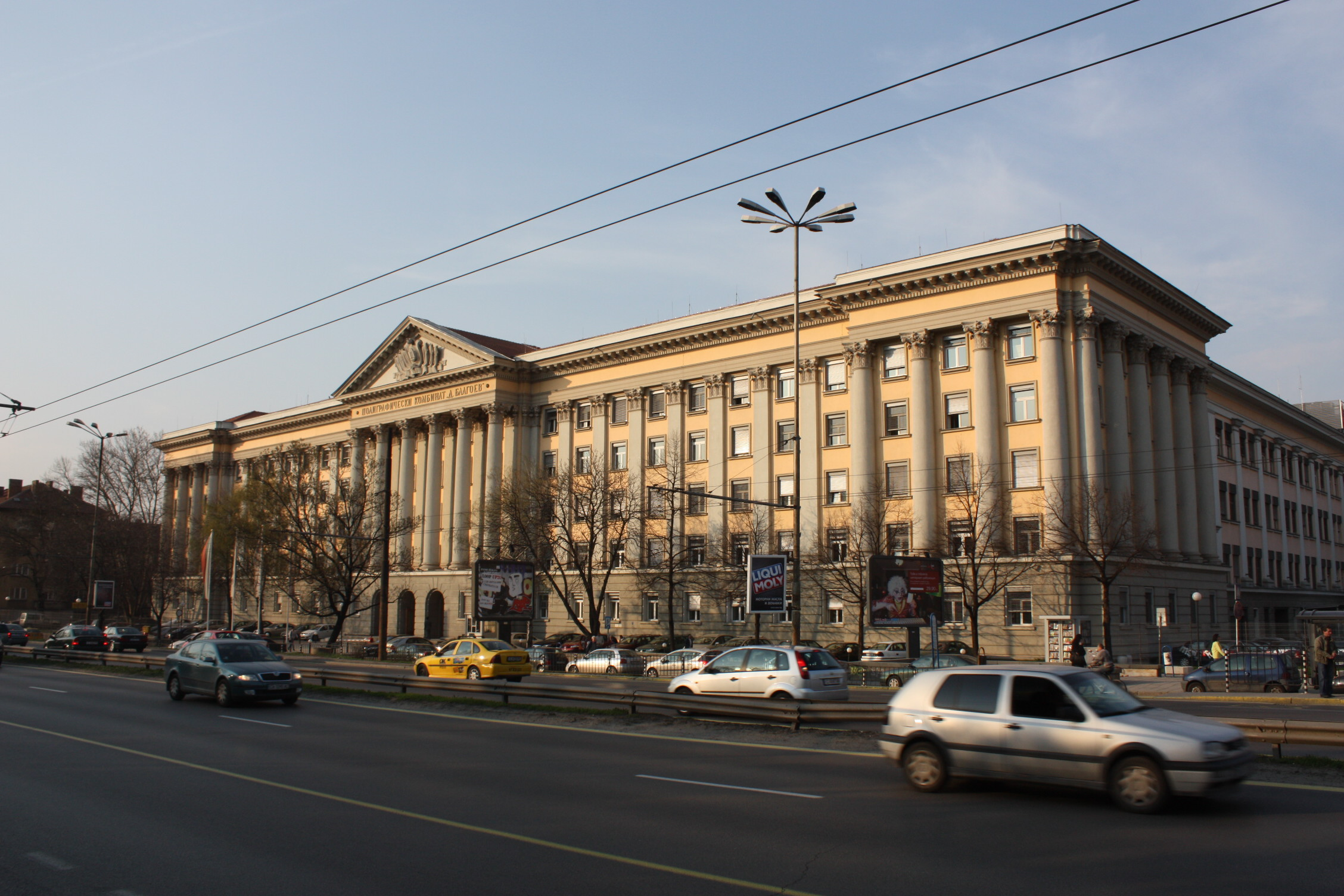
The ex-Printing factory

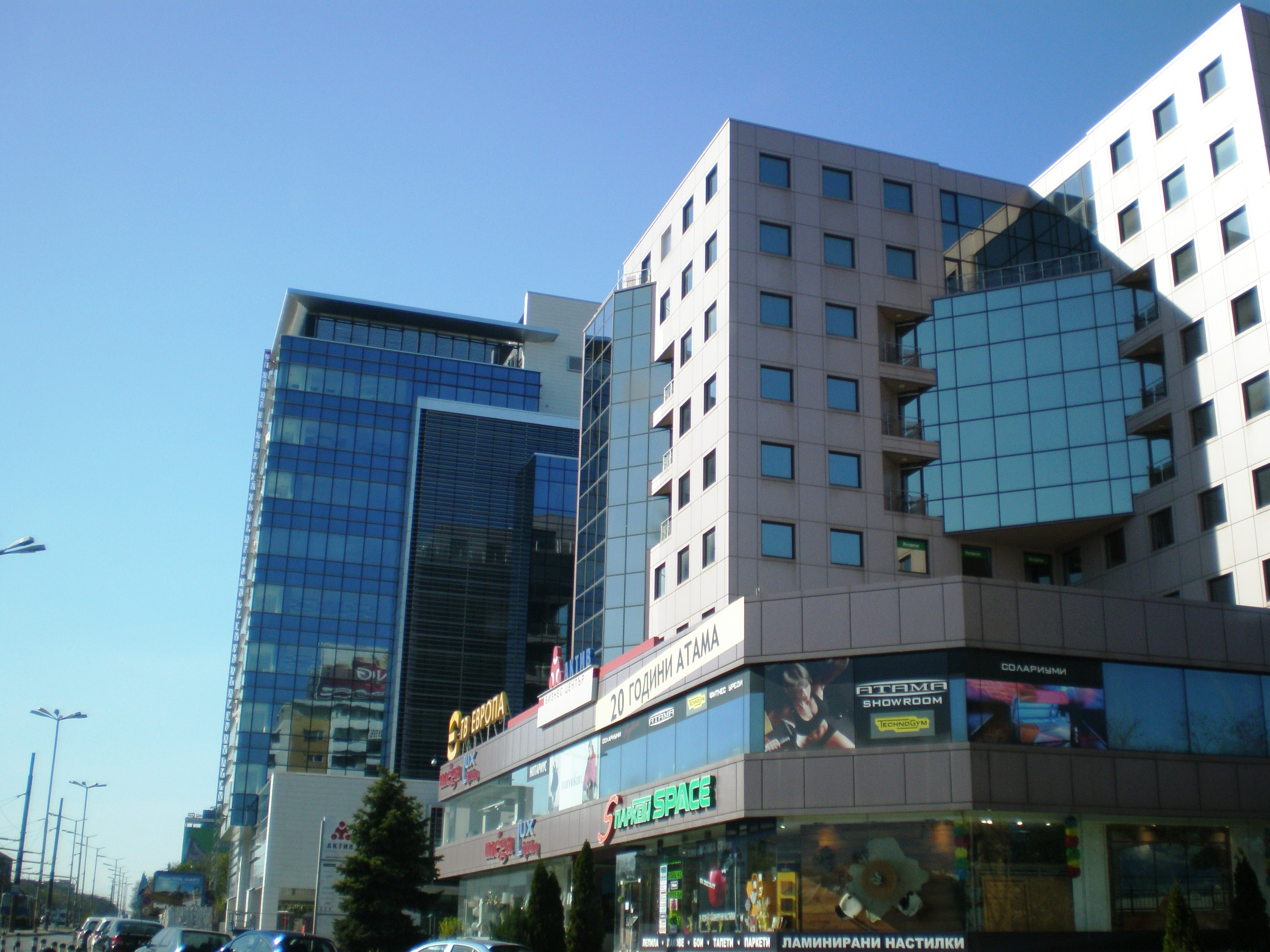
Office buildings

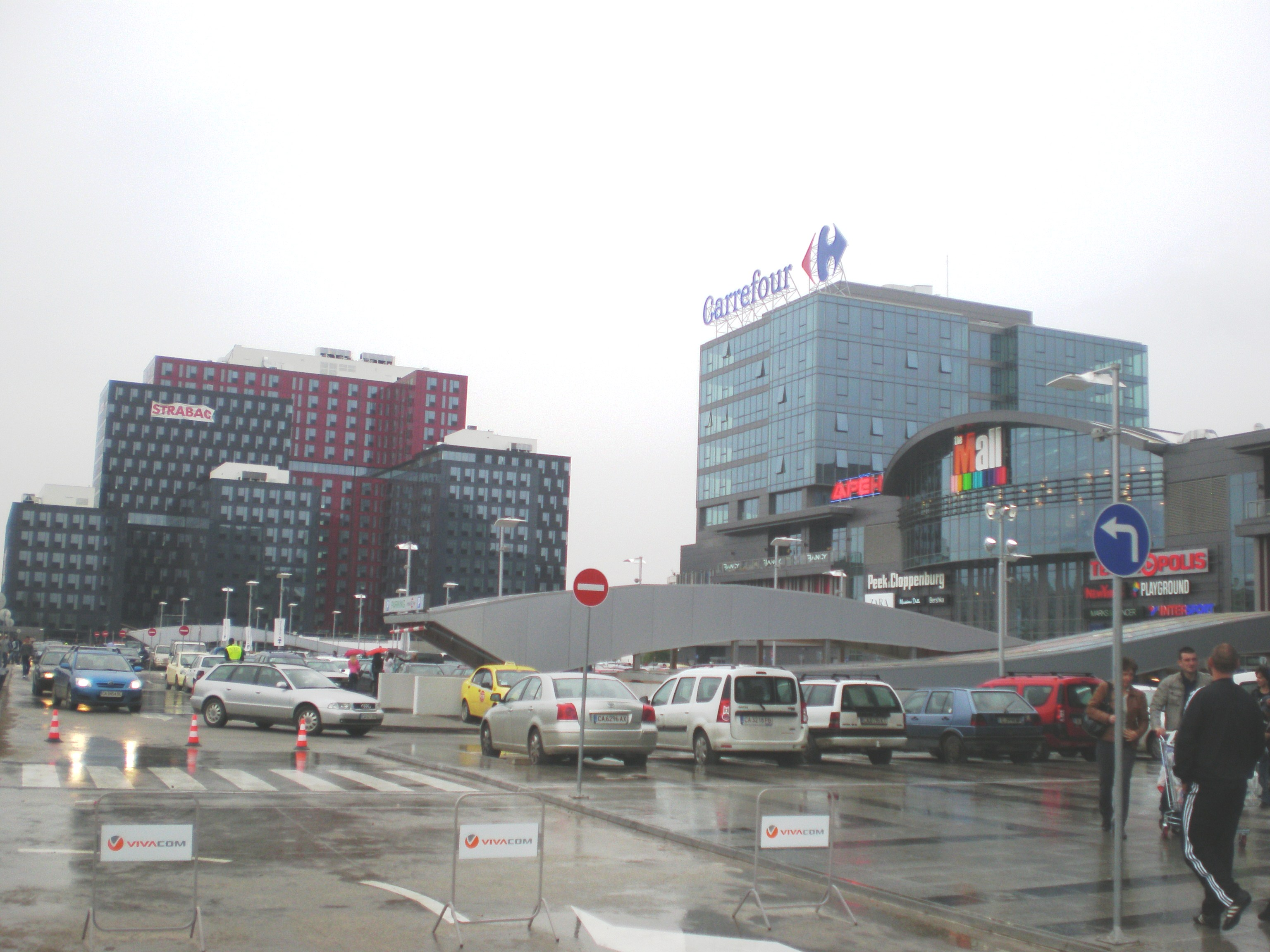
The Mall (Sofia)

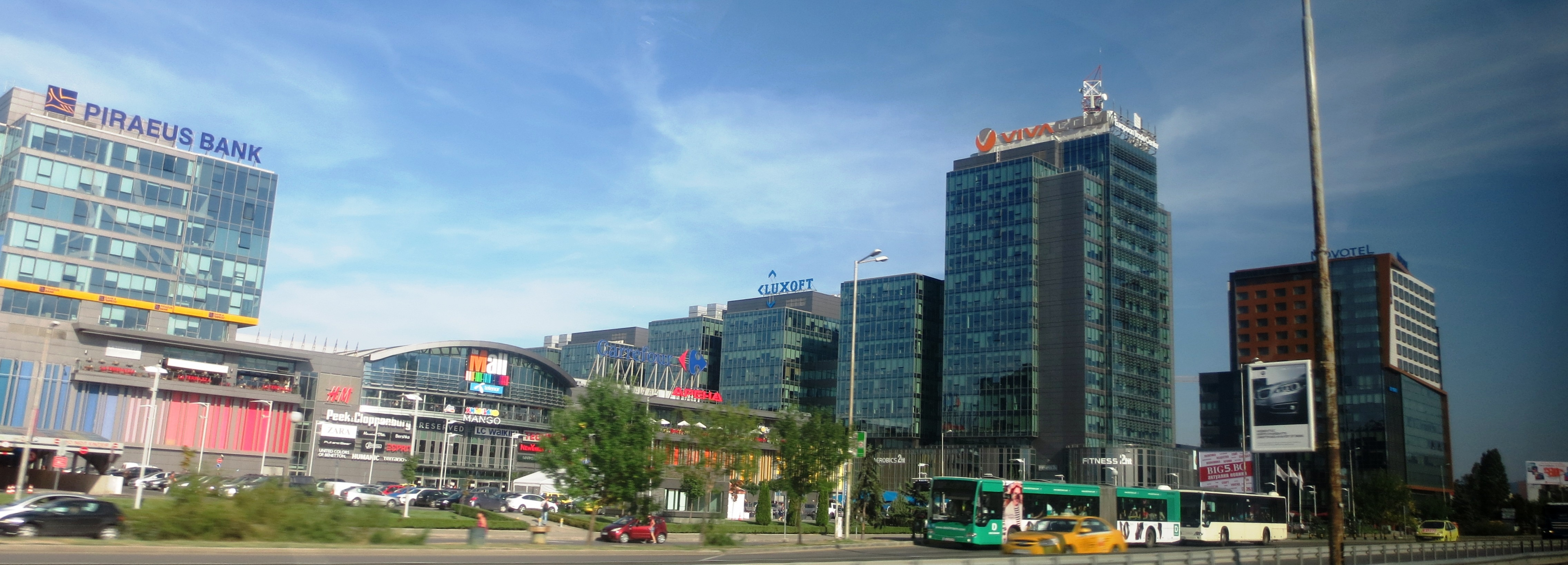
Vivacom Centre and The Mall

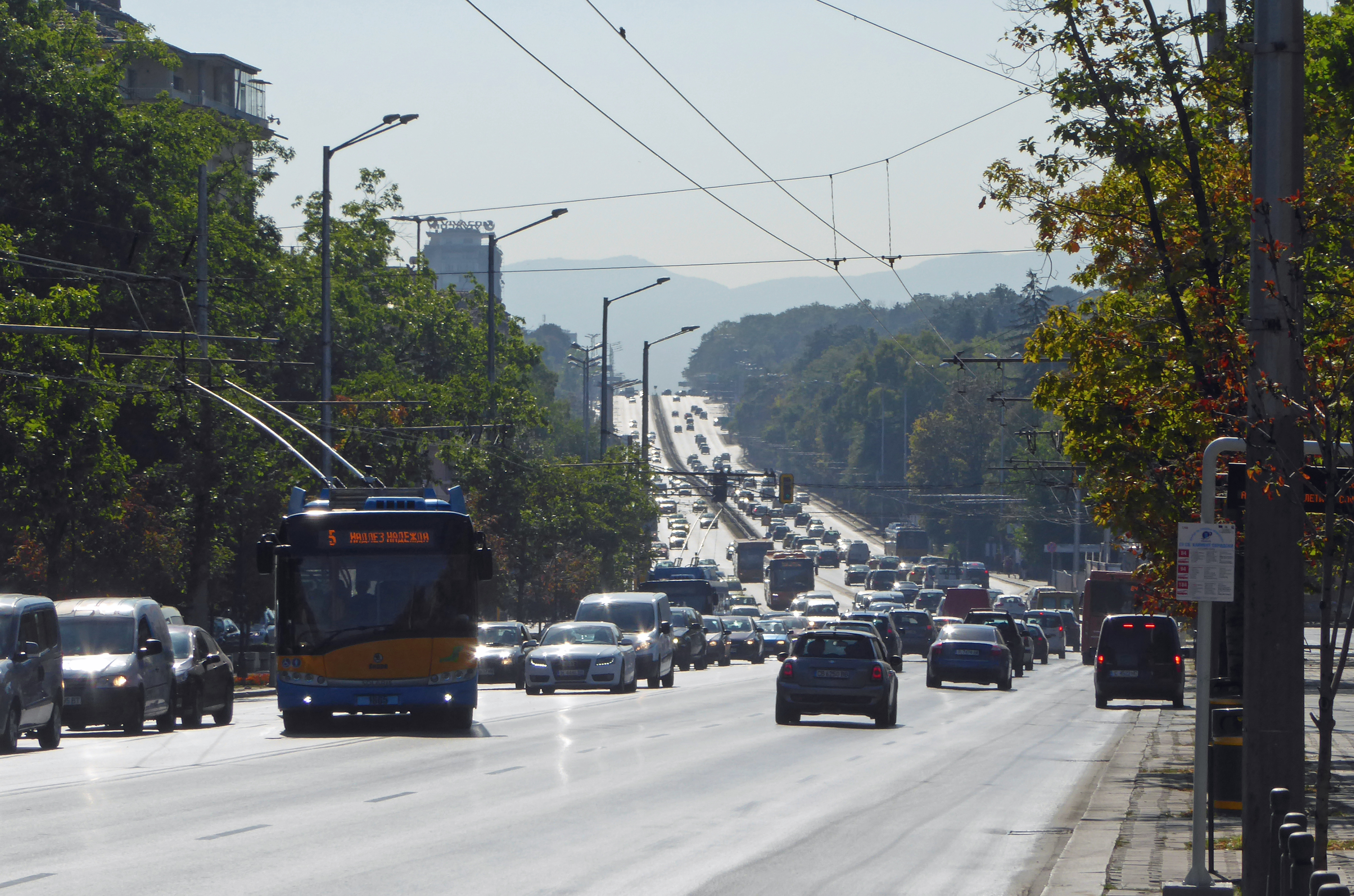
Looking at Orlov most

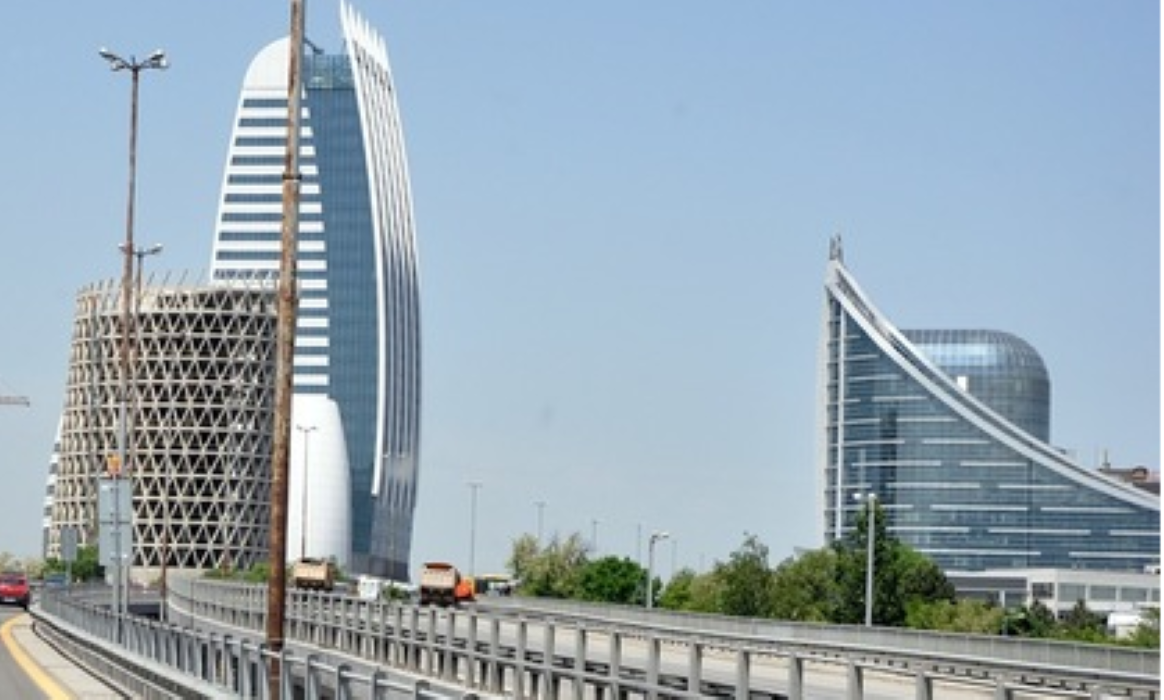
Capital Fort Building at the entrance to Sofia
