= Teatralna =

Teatralna (Ukrainian: Театральна, Bulgarian: Театрална) may stand for:

- Teatralna (Kyiv Metro), a station of the Kyiv Metro system in Kyiv, Ukraine
- Teatralna (Dnipro Metro), a station of the Dnipro Metro system in Dnipro, Ukraine
- Teatralna Metro Station (Sofia Metro), a station of the Sofia Metro in Sofia, Bulgaria

== See also ==
- Teatralnaya metro station (disambiguation)
