= Patriarch Evtimiy Metro Station =

Sofia metro station

Patriarch Evtimiy Патриарх Евтимий

General information
- Location: 1142 Sofia center, Sofia
- Coordinates: 42°41′17.5″N 23°19′39.3″E
- Owner: Sofia Municipality
- Operator: Metropoliten JSC
- Platforms: side
- Tracks: 2
- Tram routes: 4
- Bus routes: 2
- Connections
- Tram: 10, 12, 15, 18
- Trolleybus: 1, 2, 5, 7, 8
- Bus: 94, N2

Construction
- Structure type: sub-surface
- Platform levels: 2
- Parking: no
- Cycle facilities: yes
- Accessible: yes
- Architect: Irena Derlipanska

Other information
- Status: Staffed
- Station code: 3317; 3318
- Website: Official website

History
- Opened: 26 August 2020

Services
Preceding station	Sofia Metro	Following station
NDK II towards Gorna Banya	M3 line	Orlov Most towards General Vladimir Vazov
Location

Patriarch Evtimiy (Bulgarian: Патриарх Евтимий) is a Sofia Metro station on M3 line. It was opened on 26 August 2020 as part of the inaugural section of the line, from Hadzhi Dimitar to "Tsar Boris III" Metro Station. The station is located between Orlov Most and NDK II.

== Location ==
The station is located under the Patriarch Evtimiy Square.
