= Teatralnaya metro station =

Teatralnaya metro station may refer to:

- Teatralnaya (Moscow Metro), a station of the Moscow Metro
- Teatralnaya metro station (Samara), a station of the Samara Metro, Samara, Russia; planned to open in 2010
- Teatralna, name of several metro stations in Ukraine and Bulgaria
