= Interpred World Trade Center Sofia =

Coordinates: 42°40′13″N 23°21′4″E

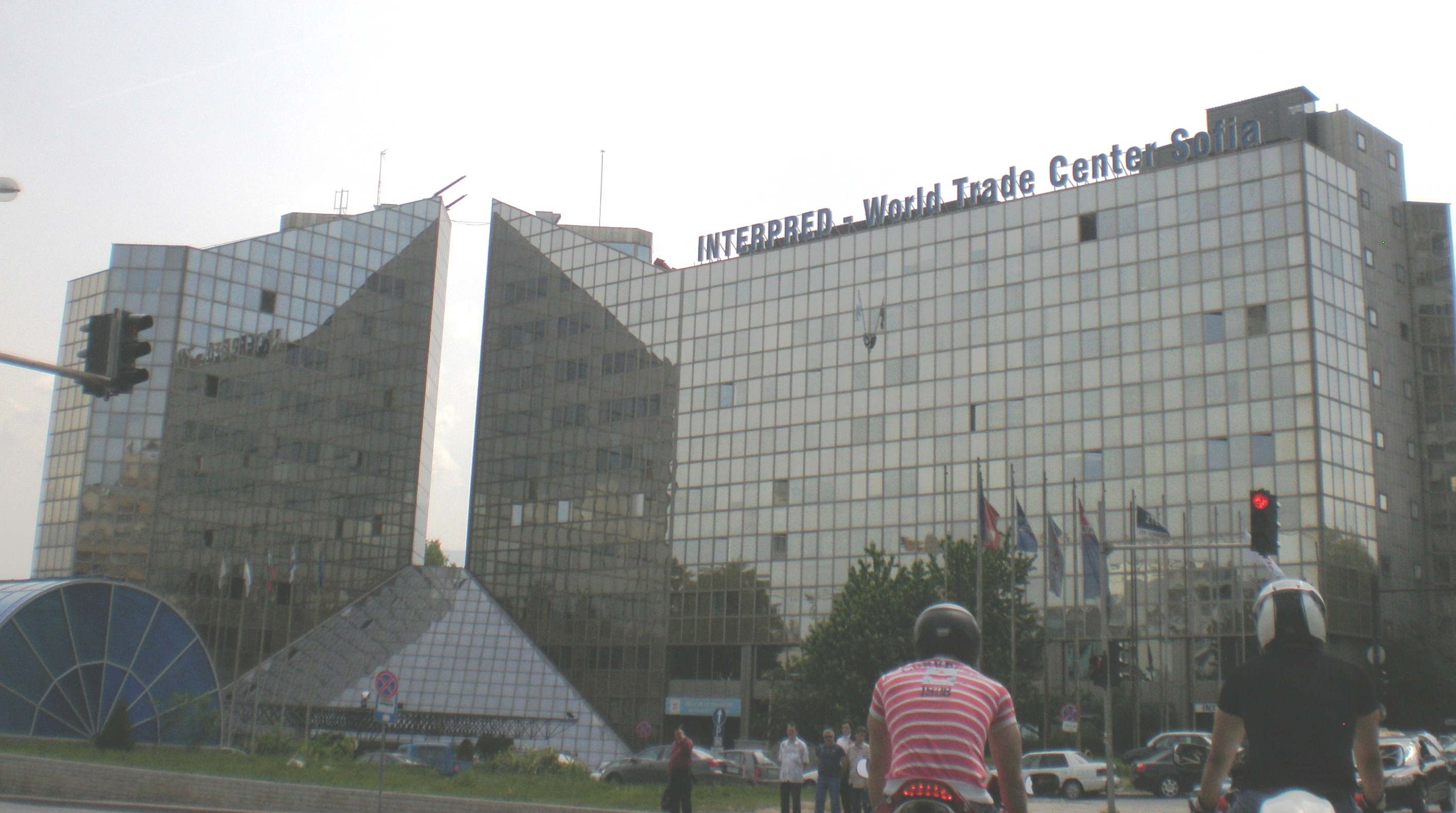
Interpred World Trade Center

The Interpred World Trade Center Sofia is an office building in Sofia, Bulgaria. It was built in the beginning of 1980s and has leasable space of about 12,750 sq.m. on 10 floors. It has 150 covered and 170 open parking slots and is served by the nearby Joliot-Curie Metro Station. The company is a member of the WTCA.

== See also ==
- List of world trade centers
