= Hadzhi Dimitar Metro Station =

Sofia metro station

Hadzhi Dimitar Хаджи Димитър

General information
- Location: 1505 Poduyane, Sofia
- Coordinates: 42°42′7.5″N 23°21′5.8″E
- Owner: Sofia Municipality
- Operator: Metropoliten JSC
- Platforms: side
- Tracks: 2
- Bus routes: 5
- Connections
- Bus: 78, 79, 90, 100, 120, M3

Construction
- Structure type: sub-surface
- Depth: 18 m (59 ft)
- Platform levels: 2
- Parking: no
- Cycle facilities: yes
- Accessible: yes
- Architect: Konstantin Kosev

Other information
- Status: Staffed
- Station code: 3309; 3310
- Website: Official website

History
- Opened: 26 August 2020

Services
Preceding station	Sofia Metro	Following station
Teatralna towards Gorna Banya	M3 line	Georgi Asparuhov Stadium towards General Vladimir Vazov
Location

Hadzhi Dimitar (Bulgarian: Хаджи Димитър) is a metro station on the M3 line of the Sofia Metro. It was opened on 26 August 2020 as part of the inaugural section of the line, from Hadzhi Dimitar to Krasno Selo; Krasno Selo was later renamed Tsar Boris III.The previous station on the line is Teatralna.

The station is named after 19th century Bulgarian revolutionary Hadzhi Dimitar.

The station was closed between 11 May and 15 June 2026 due to the construction of a junction between Teatralna and Orlov Most station, intended for the expansion of the M3 line from Zhk Geo Milev to Tsarigradsko shose. During the closure, the inoperative sections of the line were serviced by bus line "M3".

The station was the eastern terminus of the line, up until the inauguration of the third stage of line 3 on 14 August 2026.
