= Joliot-Curie Metro Station =

Sofia metro station

Joliot-Curie Жолио Кюри
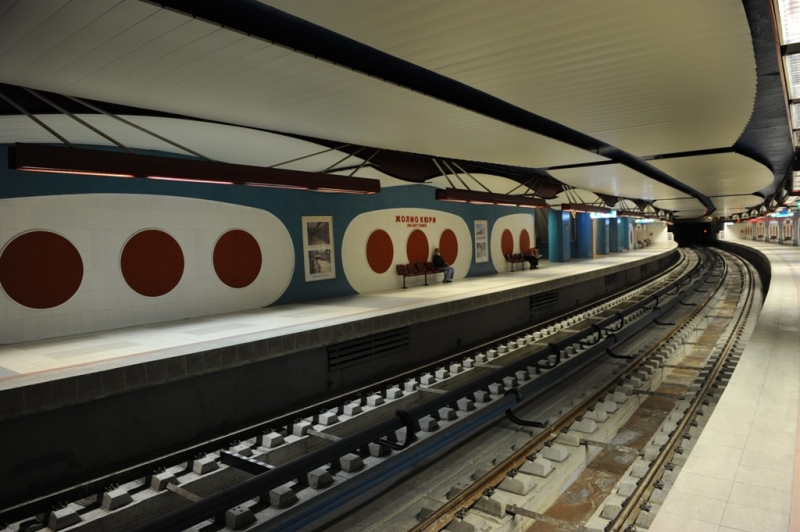

General information
- Location: 1113 Izgrev, Sofia
- Coordinates: 42°40′17″N 23°21′03″E
- Owner: Sofia Municipality
- Operator: Metropoliten JSC
- Platforms: side
- Tracks: 2
- Bus routes: 2
- Connections
- Bus: 67, 413

Construction
- Structure type: sub-surface
- Platform levels: 2
- Parking: yes
- Cycle facilities: no
- Accessible: none
- Architect: Peter Popdimitrov

Other information
- Status: Staffed
- Station code: 3019; 3020
- Website: Official website

History
- Opened: 8 May 2009

Passengers
- 2020: 487,000

Services
Preceding station	Sofia Metro	Following station
Vasil Levski stadium towards Slivnitsa	M1 line	G.M.Dimitrov towards Business Park Sofia
Vasil Levski stadium towards Slivnitsa	M4 line	G.M.Dimitrov towards Sofia Airport
Location

Joliot-Curie Metro Station (Bulgarian: Метростанция "Жолио Кюри") is a station on the Sofia Metro in Bulgaria. It was put into operation on 8 May 2009.

== Public Transportation ==
- City Bus service: 413
- Suburban Bus service: 67

== Location ==
The station is under Dragan Tsankov Boulevard at the intersection with Frederic Joliot-Curie Str. It is located next to the World Trade Center - Sofia, near the Russian Embassy.

The station serves Iztok and Izgrev residential districts and the Southern Bus Station. It is defined by a central entrance vestibule with underpass links to both sides of the boulevard and the surrounding residential areas.

The entrance vestibule and ramp of the station are covered with granite tiles and have suspended ceilings. The entire station was designed in vibrant colors: the platforms are covered with colored granite tiles and the walls have panels of circular red mosaic designs set on white tiles. The walls behind the panels are covered with a light blue mosaic.

Because of the route specifics, the station's platforms enter a maximum curve.

== Gallery ==
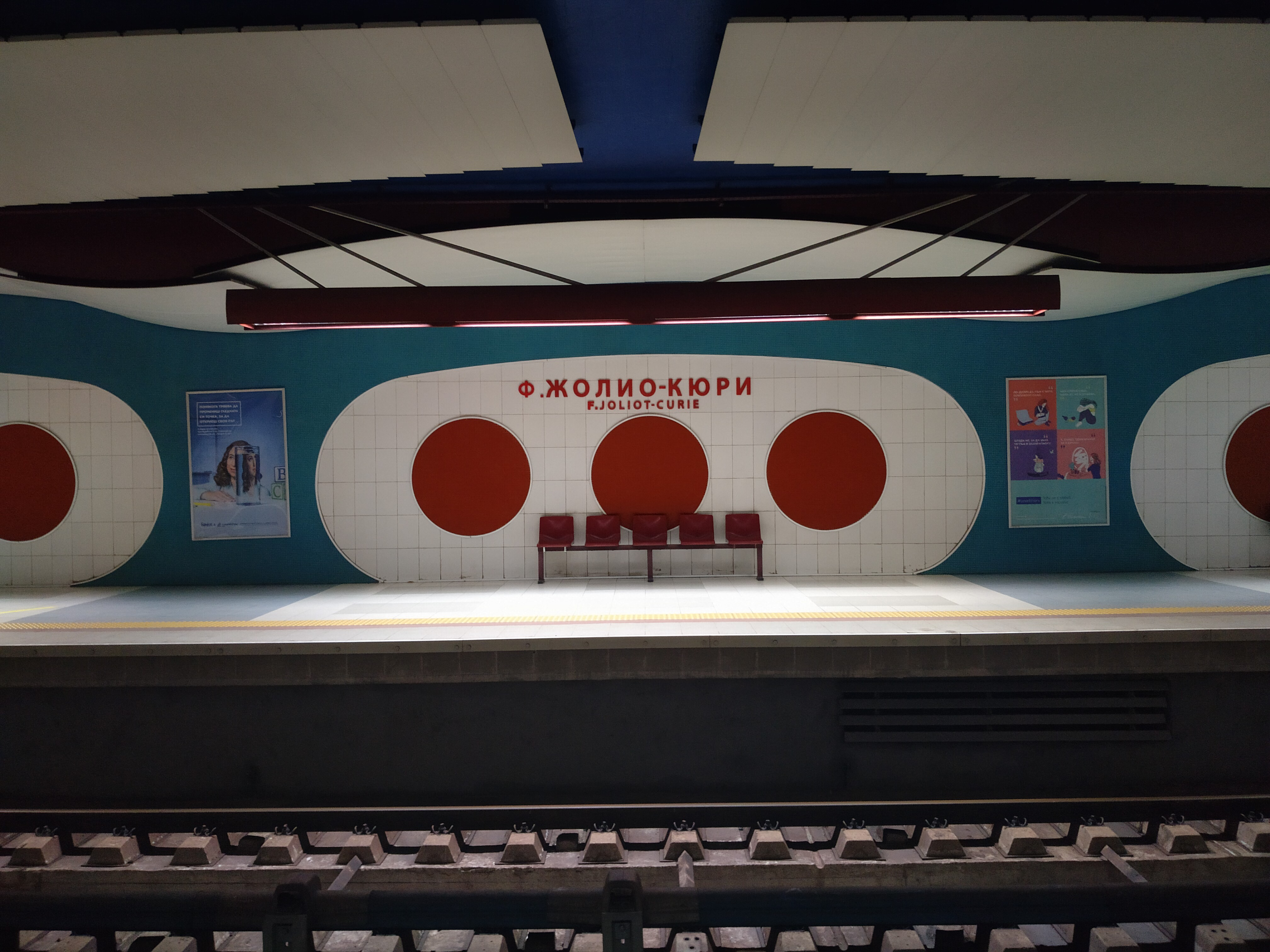
