= Vasil Levski Stadium Metro Station =

Sofia metro station

Vasil Levski Stadium Стадион "Васил Левски"
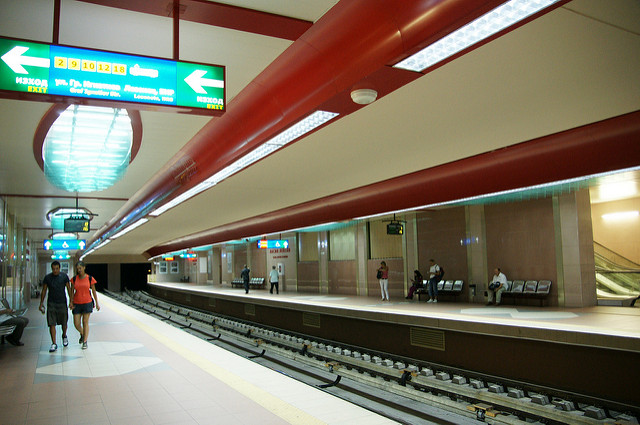

General information
- Location: 1164 Borisova Gradina, Sofia
- Coordinates: 42°41′09″N 23°19′57″E
- Owner: Sofia Municipality
- Operator: Metropoliten JSC
- Platforms: side
- Tracks: 2
- Bus routes: 6
- Connections
- Tram: 10, 12, 15, 18
- Bus: 72, 76, 94, 204, 304, 604

Construction
- Structure type: sub-surface
- Depth: 22 m (72 ft)
- Platform levels: 2
- Parking: yes
- Cycle facilities: yes
- Accessible: elevator to platofrms
- Architect: Krasen Andreev; Detelin Mushev

Other information
- Status: Staffed
- Station code: 3017; 3018
- Website: Official website

History
- Opened: 8 May 2009

Passengers
- 2020: 535,000

Services
Preceding station	Sofia Metro	Following station
SU St. Kliment Ohridski towards Slivnitsa	M1 line	Joliot-Curie towards Business Park Sofia
SU St. Kliment Ohridski towards Slivnitsa	M4 line	Joliot-Curie towards Sofia Airport
Location

Vasil Levski Stadium Metro Station (Bulgarian: Метростанция „Стадион „Васил Левски“) is a station on the Sofia Metro in Bulgaria. It was introduced into service on 8 May 2009. It serves the Vasil Levski National Stadium and New CSKA Sofia Stadium. The architectural layout was created by architects Kr. Andreev and D. Mushev.

== Automatic Platform Screen Door (APSD) ==
In August 2020, testing of the first automatic Platform screen doors (Rope-type Screen Door) commenced at the Vasil Levski Stadium Metro Station of the Sofia Metro. These safety barriers are intended for greater safety of passengers. Automatic partition doors on the existing Line 1, in addition to the Vasil Levski Stadium Metro Station, are also being built at the Opalchenska Metro Station. By 2022, this RSD system will be implemented at first 12 stations of the Line 1 and Line 2 of the Sofia Metro.

== Interchange with other public transport ==
- Tramway service: 10, 12, 18
- City Bus service: 72, 76, 94, 204, 304, 604
