= Orlov Most Metro Station =

Sofia metro station

Orlov Most Орлов мост

General information
- Location: 1142 Old City Center, Sofia
- Coordinates: 42°41′26.1″N 23°20′10.3″E
- Owner: Sofia Municipality
- Operator: Metropoliten JSC
- Platforms: side
- Tracks: 2
- Bus routes: 13
- Connections
- Metro: 1 4 via SU St. Kliment Ohridski Metro Station
- Trolleybus: 1, 2, 3, 4, 5, 8, 11
- Bus: 9, 72, 75, 76, 84, 94, 184, 204, 213, 280, 304, X50, 604

Construction
- Structure type: sub-surface
- Depth: 28 m (92 ft)
- Platform levels: 2
- Parking: no
- Cycle facilities: no
- Accessible: yes
- Architect: Krasen Andreev

Other information
- Status: Staffed
- Station code: 3315; 3316
- Website: Official website

History
- Opened: 26 August 2020

Services
Preceding station	Sofia Metro	Following station
St. Patriarch Evtimiy towards Gorna Banya	M3 line	Teatralna towards General Vladimir Vazov
Location

Orlov Most (Bulgarian: Орлов мост) is a Sofia Metro station on M3 line. It was opened on 26 August 2020 as part of the inaugural section of the line, from Hadzhi Dimitar to Krasno Selo; Krasno Selo was later renamed Tsar Boris III.

The station is located between Teatralna and St. Patriarch Evtimiy on the M3 line. Тhere is a pedestrian tunnel connecting it, to SU St. Kliment Ohridski Metro Station, allowing transfers to the M1 and M4 metro lines.

== Location ==
The station is located near Eagles' Bridge (Orlov Most) and the north-western most edge of the Borisova gradina.

== Transfers ==
The station is connected to SU St. Kliment Ohridski Metro Station via an underground tunnel, in order to facilitate transfers between the M3 and M1/4 lines.

== History ==
The station was M3's northernmost terminus between 11 May and 15 June 2026, due to the construction of a junction between it and Teatralna Metro Station, intended for the expansion of M3 from Zhk Geo Milev to Tsarigradsko shose.
