= Teatralna Metro Station (Sofia Metro) =

Sofia metro station

Teatralna Театрална

General information
- Location: 1505 Oborishte, Sofia
- Coordinates: 42°41′50.8″N 23°20′48.8″E
- Owner: Sofia Municipality
- Operator: Metropoliten JSC
- Platforms: side
- Tracks: 2
- Tram routes: 3
- Bus routes: 5
- Connections
- Tram: 20, 21, 22
- Bus: 11, 75, 213, 404, N4, M3

Construction
- Structure type: sub-surface
- Depth: 14 m (46 ft)
- Platform levels: 2
- Parking: no
- Cycle facilities: yes
- Accessible: yes
- Architect: Konstantin Kosev

Other information
- Status: Staffed
- Station code: 3311; 3312
- Website: Official website

History
- Opened: 26 August 2020

Services
Preceding station	Sofia Metro	Following station
Orlov Most towards Gorna Banya	M3 line	Hadzhi Dimitar towards General Vladimir Vazov
Location

Teatralna (Bulgarian: Театрална) is a Sofia Metro station on M3 line. It was opened on 26 August 2020 as part of the inaugural section of the line, from Hadzhi Dimitar to Krasno Selo; Krasno Selo was later renamed Tsar Boris III.

== Location ==
On the M3 line, the station is located between the Hadzhi Dimitar and Orlov Most metro stations. It sits on the south-eastern edge of Zaimov park and the station's length runs along an underground section of the Perlovska river.

== Name ==
The station's name can be translated to mean "Theatrical". The name was chosen due to the station's proximity to several theaters, a theatre college and the National Academy of Music.
