= SU St. Kliment Ohridski Metro Station =

Sofia metro station

SU St. Kliment Ohridski СУ "Св. Климент Охридски"
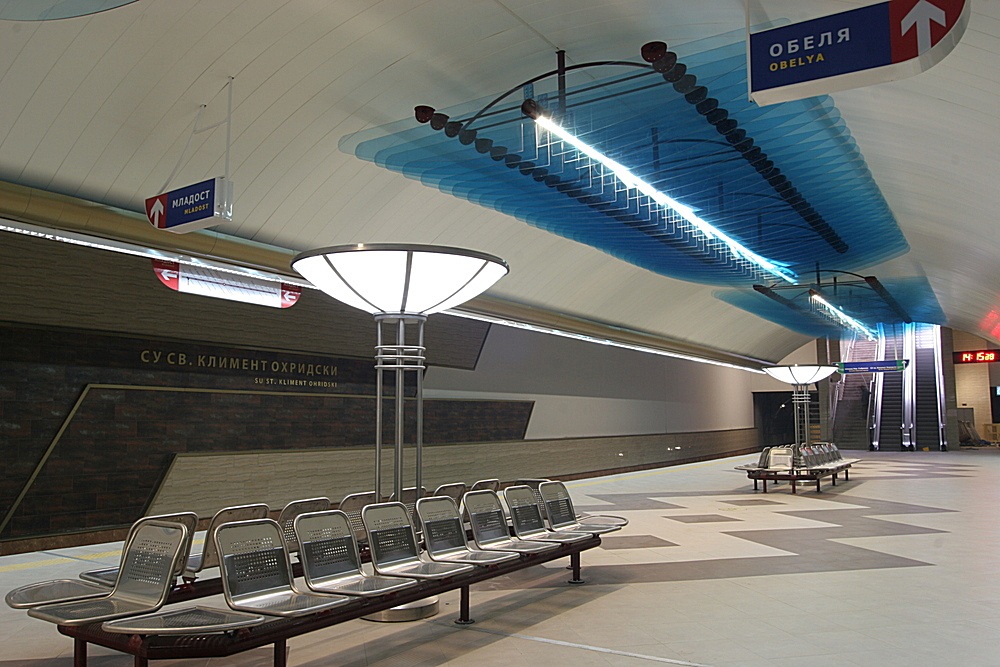

General information
- Location: 1142 Old City Center, Sofia
- Coordinates: 42°41′32″N 23°20′05″E
- Owner: Sofia Municipality
- Operator: Metropoliten JSC
- Platforms: island
- Tracks: 2
- Bus routes: 13
- Connections
- Metro: 3 via Orlov Most Metro Station
- Trolleybus: 1, 2, 3, 4, 5, 8, 11
- Bus: 9, 72, 75, 76, 84, 94, 184, 204, 213, 280, 304, X50, 604

Construction
- Structure type: sub-surface
- Platform levels: 2
- Parking: no
- Cycle facilities: yes
- Accessible: yes
- Architect: Krasen Andreev

Other information
- Status: Staffed
- Station code: 3015; 3016
- Website: Official website

History
- Opened: 7 September 2009

Passengers
- 2020: 711,000

Services
Preceding station	Sofia Metro	Following station
Serdika towards Slivnitsa	M1 line	Vasil Levski Stadium towards Business Park Sofia
Serdika towards Slivnitsa	M4 line	Vasil Levski Stadium towards Sofia Airport
Location

Sofia University St. Kliment Ohridski Metro Station (Bulgarian: Метростанция „Софийски университет „Св. Климент Охридски“) is a station on the Sofia Metro in Bulgaria. It was introduced into service on September 7, 2009. On 26 August 2020, transfer to Orlov Most on M3 line was opened.

== Public Transportation ==
West side:

- Trolleybus service: 1, 2, 4, 11
- City Bus service: 9, 84, 94, 280

East side:

- Trolleybus service: 4, 5, 8, 11
- City Bus service: 9, 72, 75, 76, 84, 94, 204, 213, 214, 280, 304, 306, X50, 604

== Location ==
The Sofia University St. Kliment Ohridski Metro Station is located on the intersection of Vasil Levski Boulevard and Tsar Osvoboditel Boulevard next to the Sofia University, the central park Borisova gradina and National Assembly of Bulgaria in the center of the city.

== Gallery ==
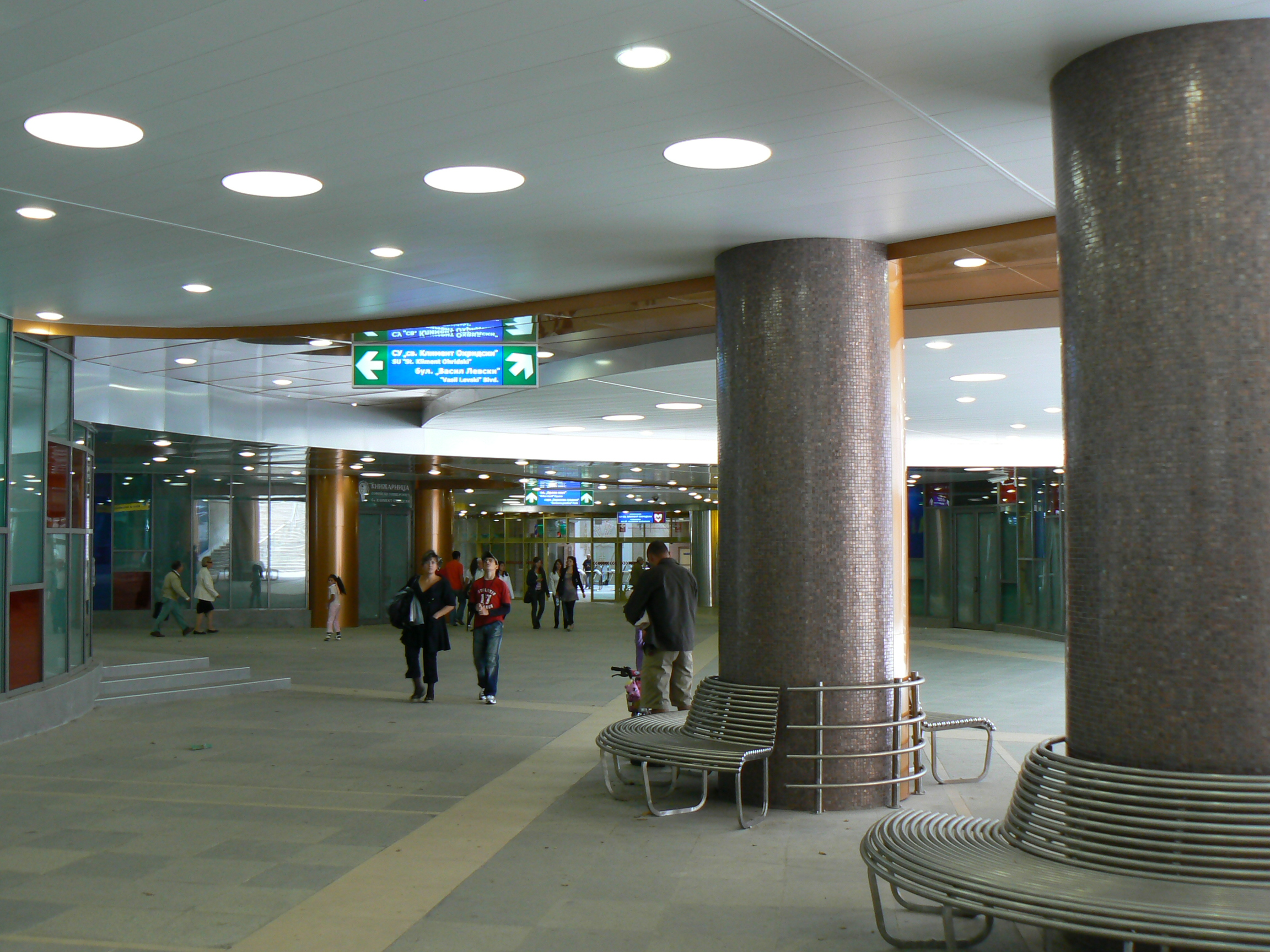

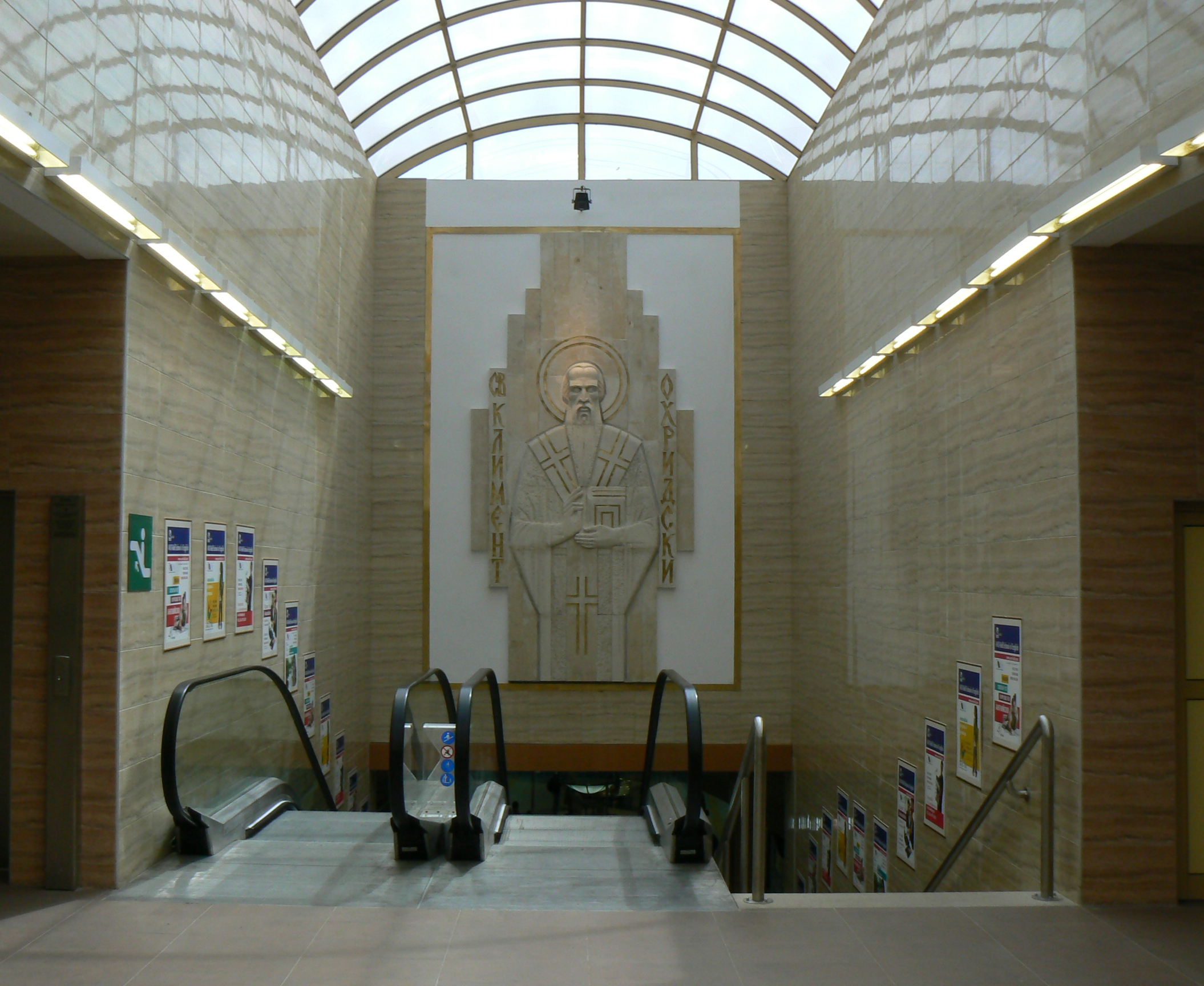

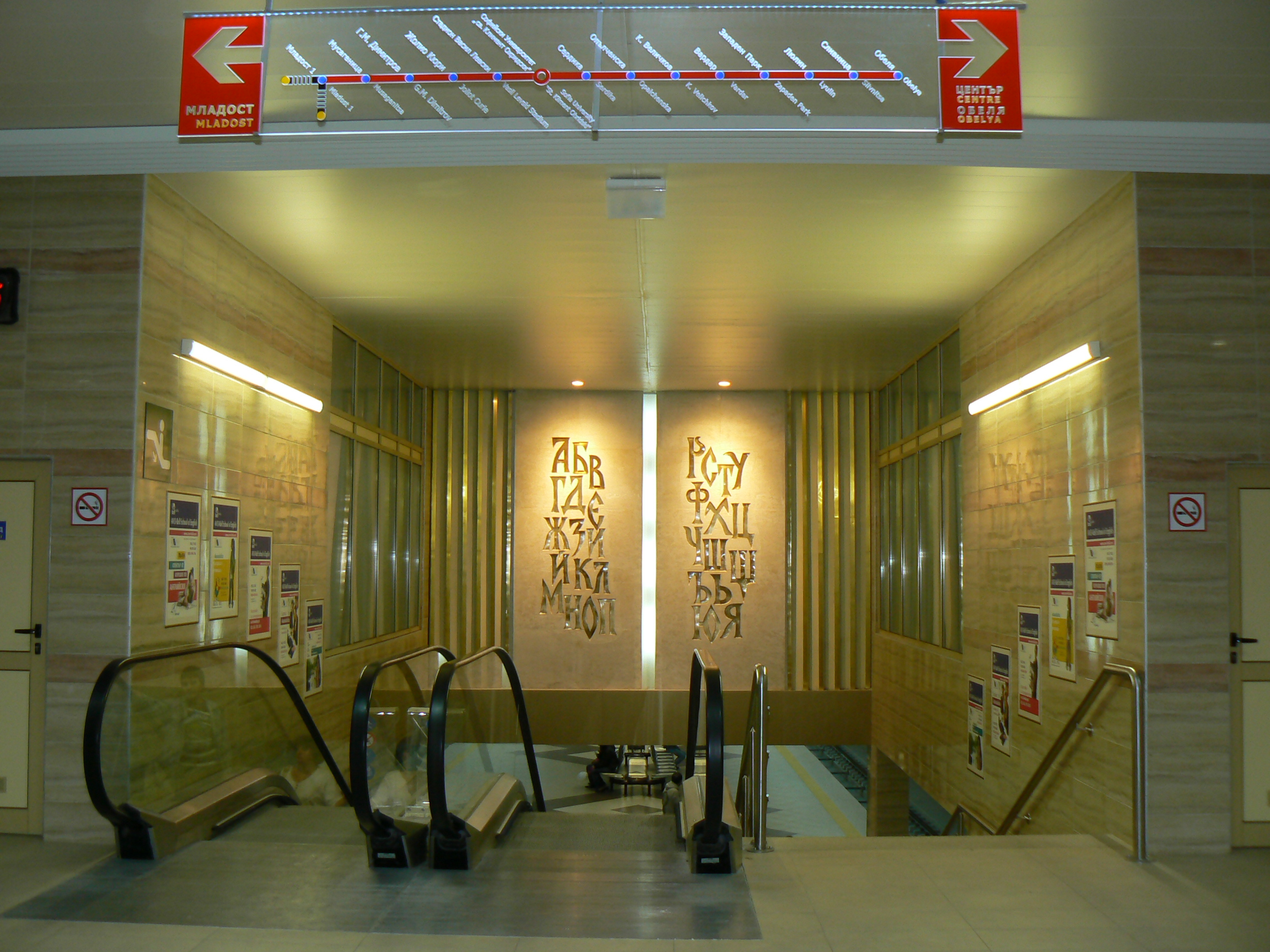

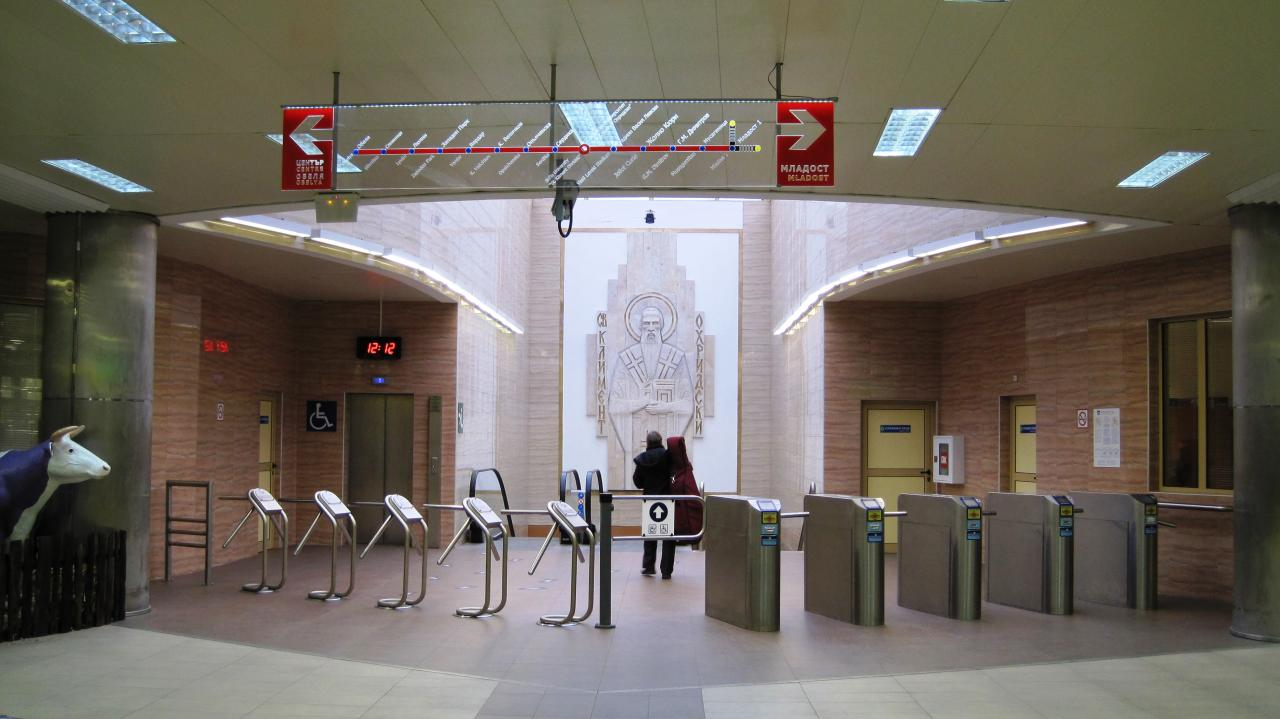
