= Vasil Levski National Stadium =

Stadium in Sofia, Bulgaria

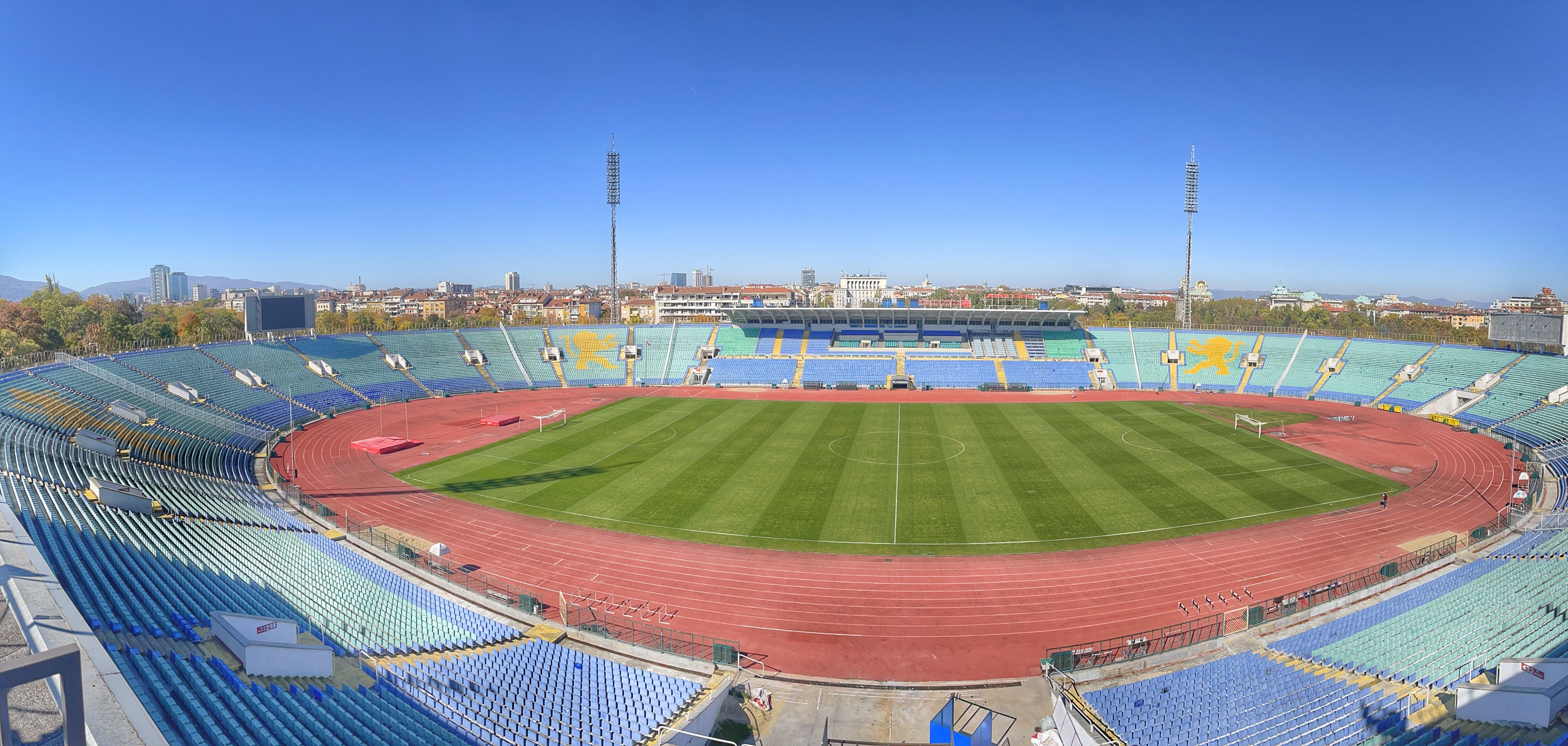
- UEFA Category 4 Stadium
- Interactive map of Vasil Levski National Stadium
- Location: Sofia, Bulgaria
- Coordinates: 42°41′15″N 23°20′7″E
- Owner: Ministry of Physical Education and Sport of Bulgaria
- Operator: Ministry of Physical Education and Sport of Bulgaria
- Capacity: 43,230
- Surface: Grass
- Field size: 105 x 68
- Public transit: Vasil Levski Stadium; buses, trolleybuses, trams (see location section)

Construction
- Opened: 5 July 1953
- Renovated: 1966, 2002, 2012, 2015
- Architect: Kano Dundakov

Tenants
- Levski Sofia (1934–1950); Bulgaria national football team (1950–); CSKA 1948 (2016–2021); CSKA Sofia (2024–2026)

Vasil Levski National Stadium (Bulgarian: Национален стадион "Васил Левски"), named after Bulgarian national hero and revolutionary Vasil Levski (1837–1873), is the country's second largest stadium. The stadium has 43,230 seats and is located in the centre of Sofia, on the territory of the city's oldest and most famous park - the Borisova gradina. The Bulgaria national football team's home matches and the Bulgarian Cup finals are held at the venue, as well as athletics competitions. It was used as the home venue for Levski Sofia's Champions League games, and is often used for important derbies between the big clubs from Sofia, instead of their own home stadiums.

== History ==
Vasil Levski National Stadium was officially opened in 1953, extended in 1966 and renovated in 2002.

Prior to their demolition by the Communist authorities during the 1940s and 50s, two other stadiums stood on the ground where the current national stadium lies. One of those was Levski Sofia's club stadium, called Levski Field (Bulgarian: Igrishte Levski, completed 1934), and the other - the Yunak Stadium (built 1928), which lay partially to the southwest. The latter used to host national football team matches with its capacity of about 15,000 seats. Levski were never compensated for their loss. During the 1960s, they built a new stadium - the present day Georgi Asparuhov.

The Vasil Levski stadium was completed in 1953 with an announced capacity of 42,000. Originally, only the lower tier of stands was built (roughly half the height of the current stands), and, due to the uneven lie of the land, the western end of the pitch and stands were below ground level. The upper tier was built about a decade later, with the current floodlight towers built in the late 1960s.

The Vasil Levski stadium was used for athletics competitions immediately after its official opening on 5 July 1953. The first football match played there after its opening was a friendly between Dinamo Sofia and FC Wien and, a month later, it also began being used for league games. The first international was a world cup qualifier on 6 September against Czechoslovakia.

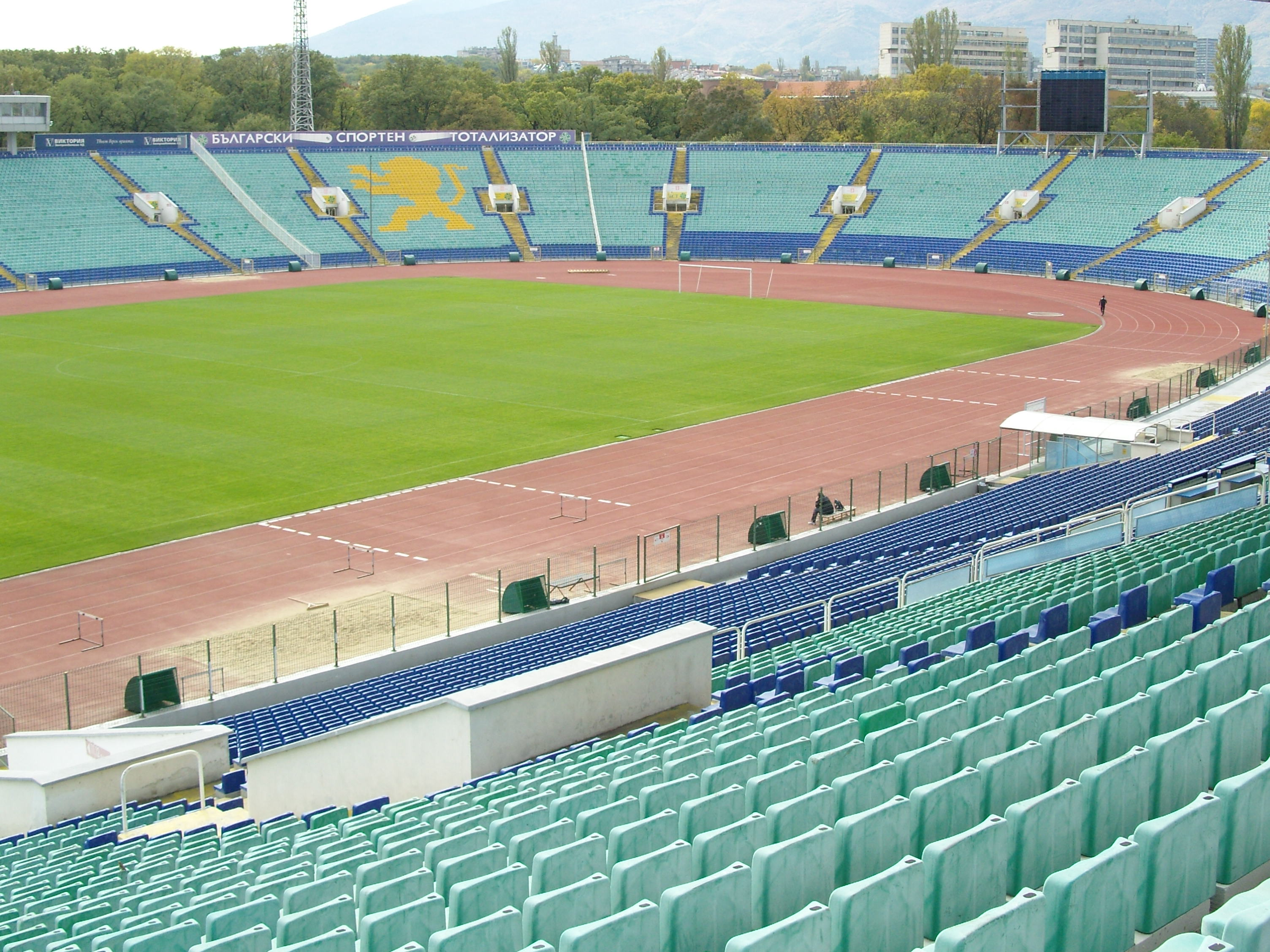

The stadium offers also judo, artistic gymnastics, basketball, boxing, aerobics, fencing and table tennis halls, as well as a general physical training hall, two conference halls and three restaurants. It hosted the 1957 European basketball championship.

It was the proposed venue for the opening and closing ceremonies in Sofia's bid for the 2014 Winter Olympics.

In July 2011, plans were announced to build a new 40,000 all-seater national stadium in the Sofia suburbs, but was later scrapped.

== Concert venue ==
The stadium has hosted music shows by a number of regional and world stars.

The biggest concert in Bulgaria ever and thus at the Vasil Levski stadium was held by Yugoslav superstar Lepa Brena on 24 July 1990 in front of 120,000 people. This record remains unbroken to date. The curiosity of the concert was the way Lepa Brena arrived at the stadium - by landing from the Mil Mi-8 helicopter directly to the stage.

American metal band Metallica held one of the most successful concerts in Bulgaria in the stadium as part of their 2008 European Vacation Tour, attracting 50,000 people.

American superstar Madonna had a very successful concert here as part of the second European second leg of her Sticky & Sweet Tour on 29 August 2009. She performed in front of 54,000 people and was warmly welcomed by her numerous fans. After the show, the grass was badly damaged, which caused some discontent amongst football fans, national team players, coaches and staff.

On 14 May 2010, Australian rock band AC/DC played the Bulgarian capital Sofia, in front of nearly 60,000 fans as part of their Black Ice World Tour.

A festival, under the name Sofia Rocks, part of Sonisphere Festival took place on the Vasil Levski National Stadium. The festival was held over 2 days on 22 and 23 June with live performances by world-renowned bands such as Rammstein, Metallica, Manowar and Alice in Chains among others.

The Big Four, Metallica, Megadeth, Slayer, and Anthrax, performed all together during the Sonisphere Festival. The performance at the Sonisphere Festival in Sofia was beamed to more than 450 movie theatres in more than 140 markets in the U.S. and select cities in Europe, Canada and South America on 22 June 2010. The live video was later released on DVD and Blu-ray in October 2010, entitled The Big 4 Live from Sofia, Bulgaria.

On 30 October, the North American rock band Bon Jovi announced that they will perform live at Levski during their Because We Can tour on 14 May 2013.

On 30 July 2023, the North American pop rock band Imagine Dragons performed live at Levski as part of their Mercury World Tour

== Concerts ==
Concerts at Vasil Levski National Stadium
Date	Artist	Tour	Attendance
24 July 1990	Lepa Brena	Lepa Brena for 4 persons	120,000
14 September 2006	Ceca	Grom Tour	10.000
2 October 2003	Azis	—N/a	50,000
24 July 2008	Metallica	2008 European Vacation Tour	50,000
29 August 2009	Madonna	Sticky & Sweet Tour	53,660
14 May 2010	AC/DC	Black Ice World Tour	60,000
22 June 2010	Megadeth, Anthrax, Slayer, Metallica	Sonisphere Festival	50,000
23 June 2010	Rammstein	Liebe ist für alle da Tour	35,000
8 July 2012	Guns N' Roses	Up Close and Personal Tour	10,000
14 May 2013	Bon Jovi	Because We Can: The Tour	47,266
26 July 2013	Rammstein	Made in Germany 1995–2011 (tour)	N/A
30 August 2013	Roger Waters	The Wall Live (concert tour)	31,371
25 September 2015	Slavi Trifonov	—N/a	70,000
30 July 2023	Imagine Dragons	Mercury World Tour	44,000
31 August 2024	Ed Sheeran	+–=÷× Tour	60,016 / 60,016
14 September 2024	Andrea Bocelli	Andrea Bocelli 30: The Celebration	30,000
18 May 2025	Your Face Sounds Familiar Bulgaria	season 13, final	40 000
21 July 2025	Guns N' Roses	Because What You Want & What You Get Are Two Completely Different Things Tour	41,090 / 41,470
28 September 2025	Robbie Williams	Britpop Tour	N/A

== Location ==
The stadium is located in the city centre. It can be reached by bus (lines 9, 72, 75, 76, 84, 94, 184, 204, 213, 304, 604), trolleybus (lines 1, 2, 5, 8), tram (lines 10, 12, 18) or via the Vasil Levski Stadium metro station.

Preceded by 1955 Final Venue; Budapest	Eurobasket; Final Venue; 1957	Succeeded by 1959 Final Venue; Istanbul

Preceded by Stadio Olimpico; Italy	Universiade; 1977	Succeeded by Estadio Olímpico Universitario; Mexico
