= Borisova gradina =

Park in Sofia, Bulgaria

- Борисова градина
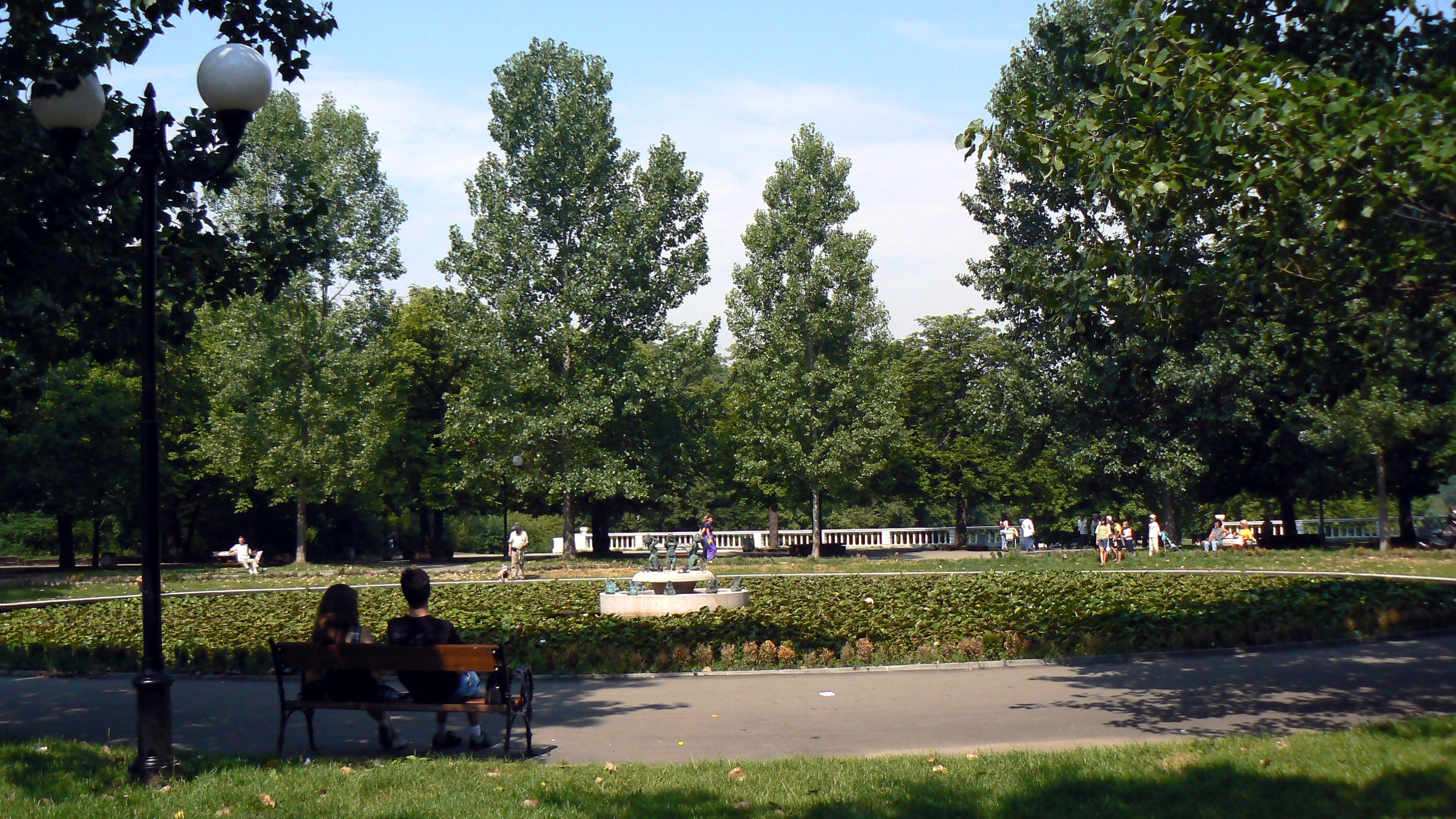
- Lily pond in Borisova gradina

- Location within Sofia
- Interactive map of Borisova gradina
- Type: Public park
- Location: Sofia, Bulgaria
- Nearest city: Sofia
- Coordinates: 42°40′47″N 23°20′29″E
- Area: 3.02 km^{2} (1.17 sq mi)
- Status: Open all year
- Public transit: 1 4 via SU St. Kliment Ohridski; 3 via Orlov Most

Borisova gradina or Knyaz-Borisova gradina (Bulgarian: Борисова градина or Княз-Борисова градина, translated as Boris' Garden or Knyaz Boris' Garden) is the oldest and best known park in Sofia, the capital of Bulgaria. Its construction and arrangement began in 1884 and it is named after Bulgarian Tsar Boris III.

The history of the garden embraces three periods under three renowned gardeners. All followed the initial scheme, developing it further and perfecting it instead of making radical changes to the original design.

== History ==
=== Neff period (1882–1906) ===
In 1882, the then-mayor of Sofia Ivan Hadzhienov brought Swiss gardener Daniel Neff from Bucharest with the intention to create a garden for the capital of Bulgaria. The mayor's initial plans included first establishing a large nursery where trees, shrubs and flowers for the future garden would grow, also providing material for the already existing gardens and for the streets.

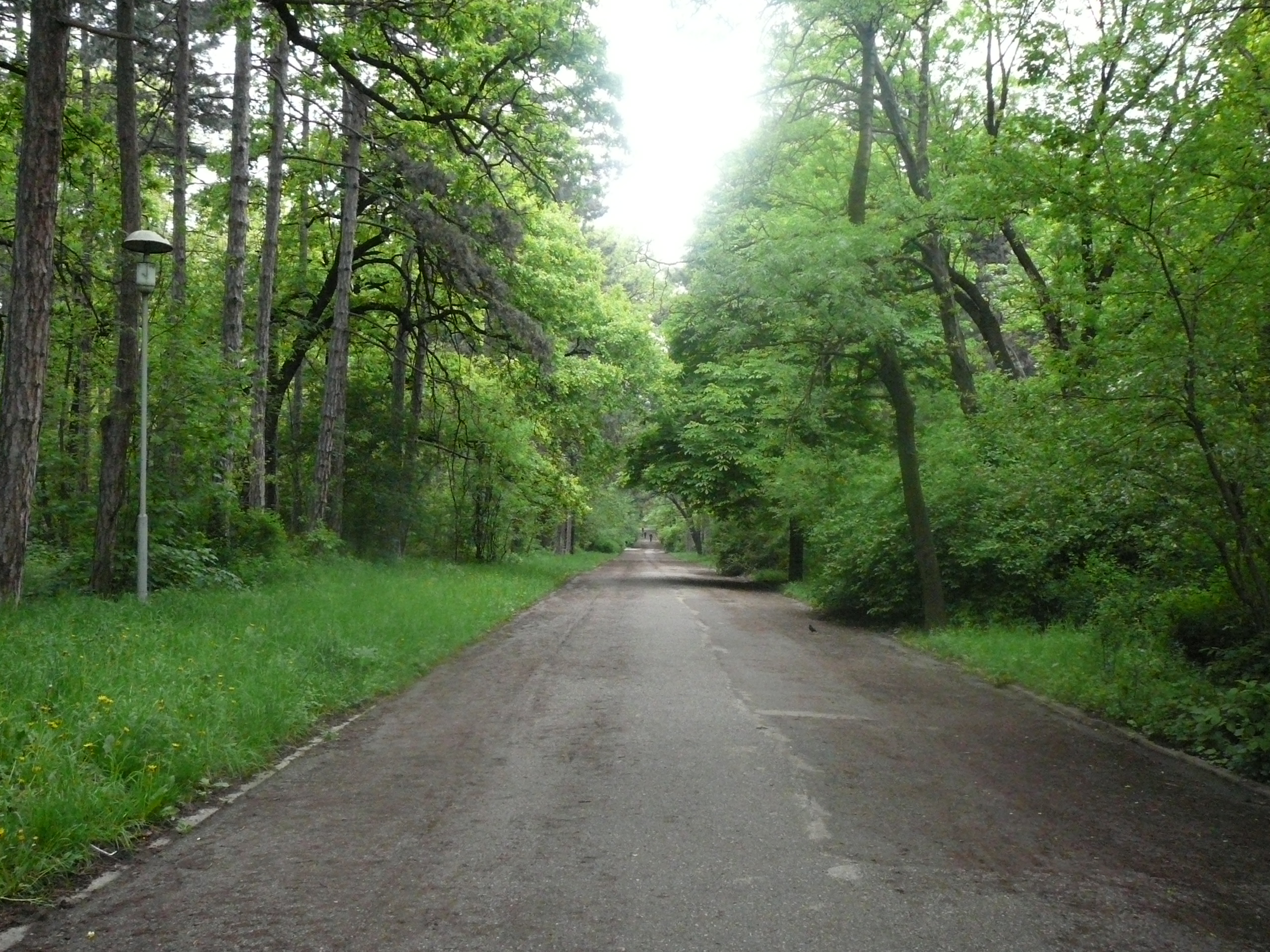
An alley in Borisova gradina

Neff developed the first plan of the garden in the spring of 1882, set up the nursery and built a house for himself, starting construction in 1884. Acacia trees were originally planted, flowerbeds were shaped, a small artificial lake was built and this all was fenced with a hedge of oaks and hawthorns. The nursery produced saplings that met the needs of the city and were also sold to the citizen. Acacia trees were most widely produced together with mulberry trees, trumpet flowers, elm trees, plane trees and others. The nursery was shaped as a garden in 1885 and had an area of 300,000 m^{2} in 1886 with four main alleys.

Borisova gradina grew to the southwest in the following years and the large lake was built in 1889. Knyaz Ferdinand ordered in 1888 the replacement of most acacias with forest oaks, sycamores, ash trees and birches. The next couple of years saw the planting of deciduous trees from neighbouring forests, as well as coniferous ones from Rila, black pines and spruces.

=== Frei period (1906–1934) ===
The Alsatian Joseph Frei was appointed manager of all gardens and parks of Sofia in 1906. He reorganized Borisova gradina according to his own plan further developing the one of Neff. In carrying out this plan Frei planted the two main alleys in the lower part of the garden, the linden and chestnut one, and opened the wide central and two side alleys in the upper part, from the children's playground to the Fish Lake. This period also witnessed the construction of the People's Fountain, later faced with freestone to be named the Freestone Fountain.

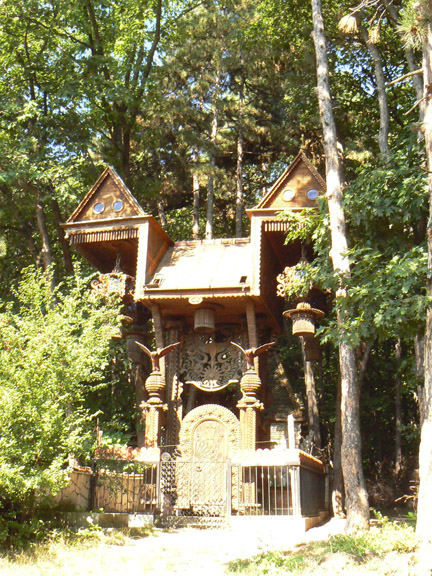
A decorative wooden house in Borisova gradina, a work of the self-taught woodcarver Racho Angelov

While Neff was an admirer of acacia trees, Frei had a passion for flowers. He created the Rosarium at the place of removed agricultural buildings, as well as the numerous modern nursery gardens and hothouses. The garden was further extended south of the oak forest to the modern Dragan Tsankov Boulevard. The fruit plantations were gradually replaced with decorative tree and shrub species, pines and spruces, turning the garden into a wonderful park.

=== Duhtev period (1934–1944) ===
The Bulgarian gardener and specialist Georgi Duhtev became the manager of the Gardens and Parks Service in 1934. During his period, the old Rosarium was extended to embrace 7,000 m^{2} with over 1,400 new cultivated rose species being planted by him. The Japanese Corner was created in 1940 above the Fish Lake towards Tsarigrad Road. Plants sent by the Japanese minister plenipotentiary were used to arrange it. These plants represented the national flora of Japan and were a gift and a sign of friendship between the Japanese and Bulgarian people.

Around 1942 Borisova gradina embraced an area of 90,500 m^{2}, 68,600 m^{2} of which planned and 4,400 m^{2} not, the remainder of 17,350 m^{2} being built up and including the Summer Swimming Bath, the University Observatory, the Open-air School, the Big Lake, the Yunak and Levski football fields, the tennis club, the diplomatic tennis court, the cycling track and the Yunak Rectifying Station.

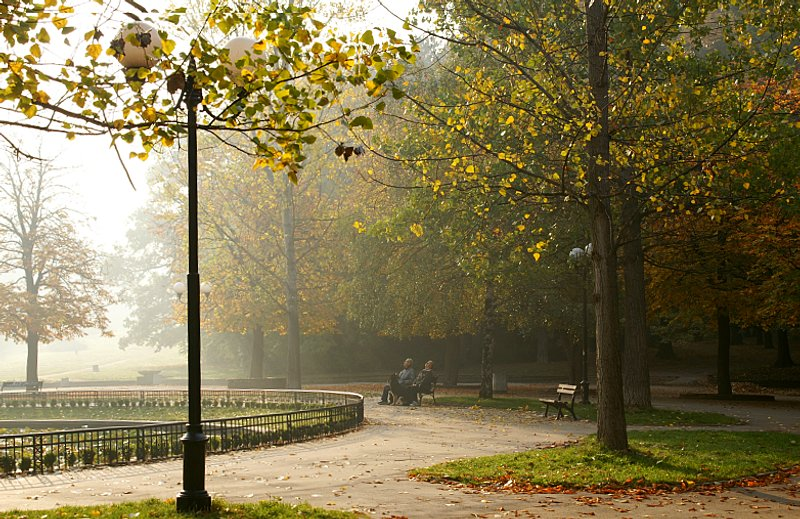
The waterlily lake in autumn

=== Later history ===
The Borisova Gradina TV Tower was built 1958–1959. Borisova gradina was last reconstructed in 1986 under Georgi Radoslavov. It was proclaimed a monument of Bulgarian park and garden art the same year.

== Name ==
Although Knyaz Boris became Tsar in 1918, there is no evidence of the park's name ever having officially changed to reflect this fact. Instead (or, perhaps, because of this), the word Knyaz was gradually dropped to become simply Boris's Garden.

After the communist regime took power in 1944, the park was renamed Парк на Свободата (Park na Svobodata - "Freedom Park"), until its fall in 1989, when it reverted to its original name.
