= Lycée Français de Sofia =

French school in Sofia

Lycée Français Alphonse de Lamartine
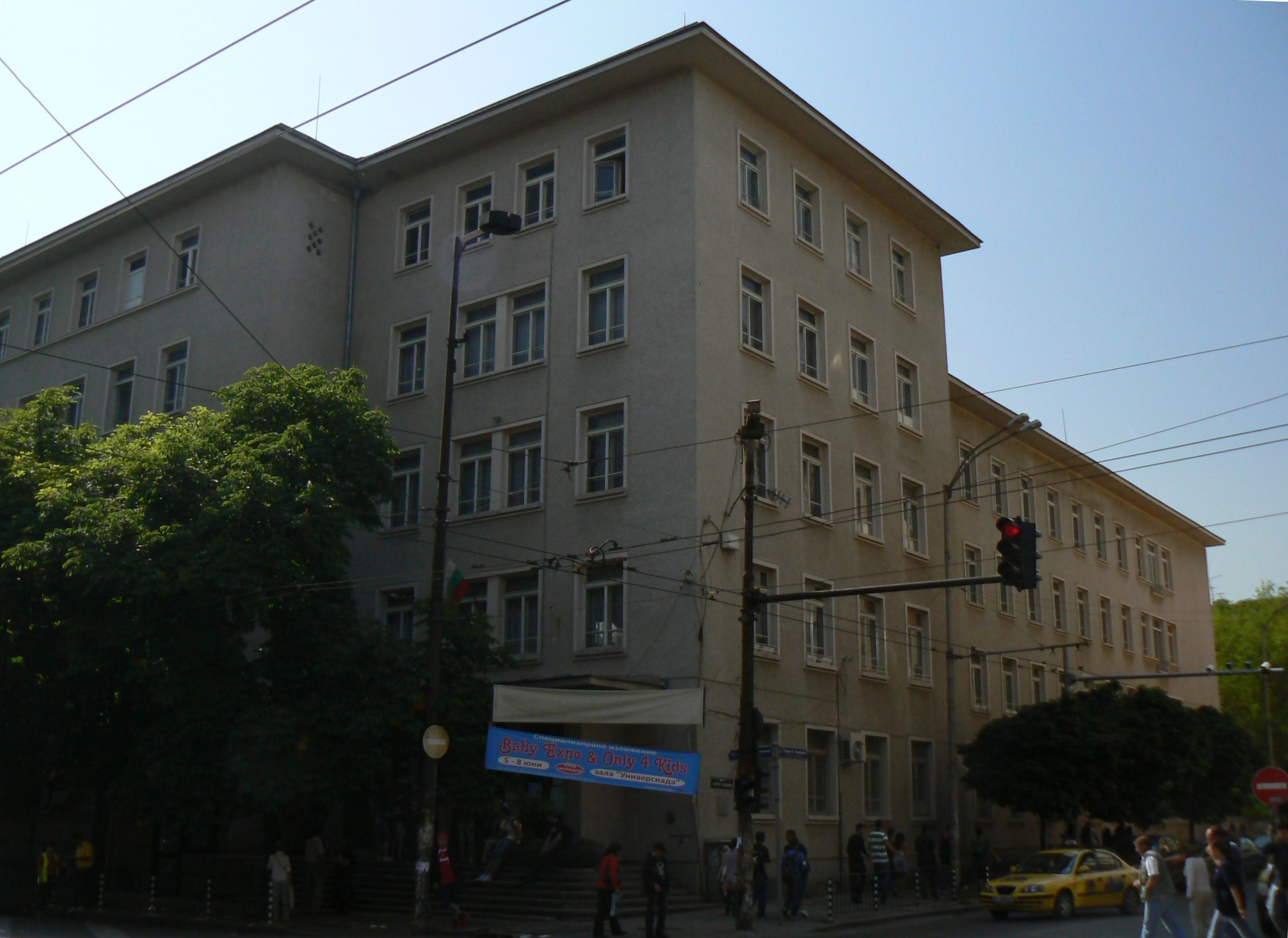
- Street view of the school

Location
- 35 Patriarch Evtimiy Boulevard; Sofia, 1142; Bulgaria
- 42°41′18″N 23°19′24″E

Information
- Type: Public; selective
- Established: 1961; 65 years ago
- Principal: Simona Angelova
- Grades: 8–12
- Gender: Coeducational
- Enrollment: 980 students
- Average class size: 26 students
- Language: French and Bulgarian
- Accreditation: AEFE; UNESCO
- Newspaper: Nouvel Ami
- Website: feg.bg

Lycée de langue française n° 9 « Alphonse de Lamartine » de Sofia (in Bulgarian: 9-та френска езикова гимназия „Алфонс дьо Ламартин", 9 ФЕГ) is a selective French language school in Sofia, established in 1961 under the name 9th French Language School Georgi Kirkov. Since the early 1990s, it has been named after the French nobleman, poet, diplomat and politician Alphonse de Lamartine, who visited and resided in the Bulgarian lands in 1832.

The Lycée is the only Bulgarian school to offer bilingual French-speaking course to all its students and has been the described as "the most important French-speaking secondary school in Bulgaria" as well as "the heart of the academic Francophonie in Bulgaria" by the Agency for French Education Abroad. It is regarded as one of the most prestigious schools in Sofia and its students have consistently ranked among the top performers in the national matriculation exams.

As of the 2020–2021 academic year, the school had 987 students and 83 staff members, with a student-teacher ratio of 14:1.

== History ==
=== Early years ===
In 1881, missionaries in Lovech founded the American Girls' College of Lovech, which gained popularity and prestige in the coming decades. In 1927, the college was recognized by the Ministry of Education, and began to issue high school diplomas. The college was forcibly closed in 1948 as a conductor of "capitalist ideology". In 1950, following the college's closure, a new institution called the Foreign Language High School was established. The school quickly gained popularity, partly due to its selection as a filming location for the 1988 film Yesterday. Four of the school's classes studied French, one studied English and one studied German. In 1956, the English class moved to Sofia and was expanded into what would become the First English Language School. In 1958, the French section moved to Varna and founded the Lycée Joliot-Curie. In 1960, the German High School in Sofia emerged from the German section, and in the following year 1961 the French section was separated from it and eventually became the Lycée.

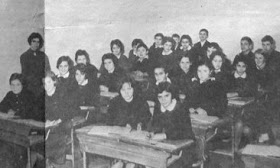
One of the schools's first preparatory classes in 1961

=== Establishment ===
When it was founded in 1961, the Lycée was housed in the Nadezhda district along with the German High School. For the academic year of 1963, it was relocated to its present building at 35 Patriarch Evtimiy Boulevard in downtown Sofia, which at that time housed the 9th Polytechnic High School. The last year group of the Polytechnic School graduated in 1965, and the school became purely linguistic. Classes with Spanish language were also opened in 1977, but in 1991, they were moved to the newly established Spanish Language School Miguel de Cervantes.

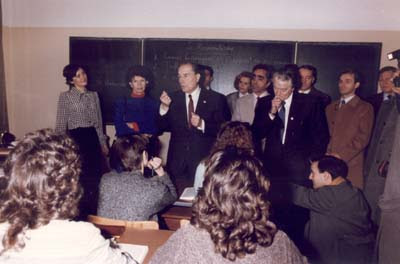
François Mitterrand taking a tour of the school during his visit to Bulgaria in 1989

In 1976, the Lycée was awarded the Order of Saints Cyril and Methodius, and in 1977, it was accepted as a member of the UNESCO Associated Schools Network. During his historic visit to Bulgaria in 1989, French President François Mitterrand visited the school, where he was greeted by students. Mitterrand got carried away conversing with the students and stayed longer than planned, violating the protocol.

=== Teachers' strike ===
In 2007, many teachers from across the country went on a strike. The Lycée's teachers gained notoriety across the country for marking all of their 900 students with excellent grades in protest of the low teachers' pay and the government's refusal to grant more money for scholarships.

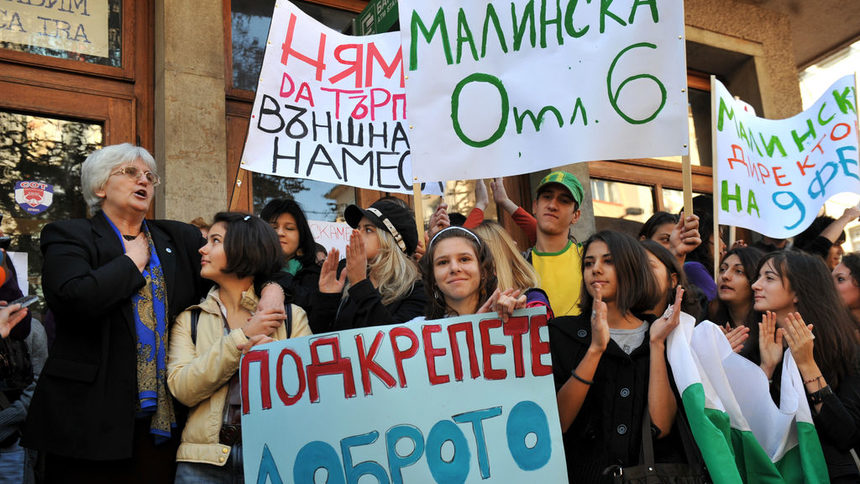
Malinska with students right before the start of the protest

A number of unannounced inspections followed as a result of the teachers' actions. The school's then principle, Penka Malinska, was accused of undermining its prestige and "financial misuse" of the scholarships which the students had received as a result of the higher marks. Malinska was forcibly retired despite not having reached retirement age at the time. Her retirement was accompanied by an acute reaction from both students and teachers. Over a hundred students marched in her support, starting at the Lycée's entrance and ending in front of the building of the Ministry of Education and Science.

== Education ==
The Lycée has established traditions and high authority in French language training. Intensive language learning is done through a program which includes 20 hours of French weekly in 8th, also called preparatory, grade and from 6 to 8 hours in later years. Some subjects, such as history, geography, biology, physics, chemistry and philosophy, are taught in French. The school's graduates can enroll in French universities without a language exam. In 2015, the school was awarded the LabelFrancÉducation, a seal of quality for bilingual education in French and another language.

During the five years of study, French literature and culture are extensively and chronologically studied in all their genres. Eleventh and twelfth grade students can submit and defend a dossier in a school subject of their choice, for which they can receive a bilingual education diploma, known as Attestation bilingue.

The Lycée's students can enroll in Microsoft's MCP Program for which they can receive a certificate which validates their technical expertise.

=== Language certificates ===
The school is the largest DELF examination center in Bulgaria, given the large number of students and candidates. The certification was introduced in 2007 by a Convention signed between the Ministry of Education and Science of Bulgaria and the French Institut of Sofia and is renewed every three years. All of the school's French language teachers are CIEP accredited examiners.

Approximately 5500 students have been enrolled in the DELF A2, B1 and B2 examinations at the Lycée Lamartine Examination Center from 2007 to 2020.

== Traditions ==
=== Arts ===
The Lycée has established traditions in theater. Each year, its theatrical troupe produces and presents a play based on a different piece by a classical French author, for which it has won several awards. The school has a choir.

=== Sports ===
The school's volleyball and basketball teams participate in the prestigious Claris Cup, in which the elite high schools of Sofia compete against each other, and the football team participates in the Bulgarian School Football League. The school also offers other sporting activities such as badminton, tennis, table tennis, skiing, swimming and chess.

=== International relations ===
The school offers educational and cultural exchanges with French-language schools from Europe, including Lycée Jacques Decour and Lycée Gerson in Paris, Collège Claparède in Geneva, Lycée Jean Pierre Vernant in Sèvres and more. The school's projects are supported by the French Institute of Sofia.

== Curriculum ==
List of classes and their respective facilitating subjects.
Class	Foreign languages^{1}		Facilitating subjects	Instruction term	Ref.
А	French	English	Literature and History	5 years	
Б	French	English	Mathematics and IT	5 years	
В	French	English	Chemistry and Biology	5 years	
Г	French	Spanish	Literature and History	5 years	
Д	French	Spanish	Mathematics and IT	5 years	
Е	French	Spanish	Mathematics and Geography	5 years	
Ж	French	German	Literature and History	5 years	
З	French	Latin			
^{1}Available foreign languages include: English, Spanish and German as a part of the school's regular curriculum, and Portuguese, Russian and Latin as complementary subjects.

== Notable former pupils ==
- Dimiter Tzantchev, diplomat, Permanent Representative of Bulgaria to the European Union, Permanent Representative to the United Nations
- Iliana Iotova, former MEP, President of Bulgaria
- Ivailo Kalfin, former MEP, former Minister of Foreign Affairs, former Minister of Labour and Social Policy
- Kapka Kassabova, writer
- Kiril Domuschiev, entrepreneur, president of Ludogorets
- Marin Raykov, diplomat, former Ambassador of Bulgaria to France, former caretaker Prime Minister of Bulgaria, former Deputy Minister of Foreign Affairs
- Nadezhda Neynsky, former Minister of Foreign Affairs, former MEP, former Ambassador of Bulgaria to Turkey
- Radan Kanev, politician, chairman of DSB
- Ruzha Lazarova, writer
- Silvia Lulcheva, actress
- Slavcho Binev, politician, MP in the 43rd National Assembly, former MEP, athlete and businessman
- Stefan Tafrov, diplomat, Permanent Representative to the United Nations, former Ambassador of Bulgaria to France, Commandeur de la Légion d'Honneur
