= Grafa =

Grafa may refer to:

- Grafa (musician), Bulgarian pop singer, composer and music producer
- Graf Ignatiev Street, Sofia, Bulgaria
