= Dragan Tsankov Boulevard =

Street in Sofia, Bulgaria

Dragan Tsankov Blvd
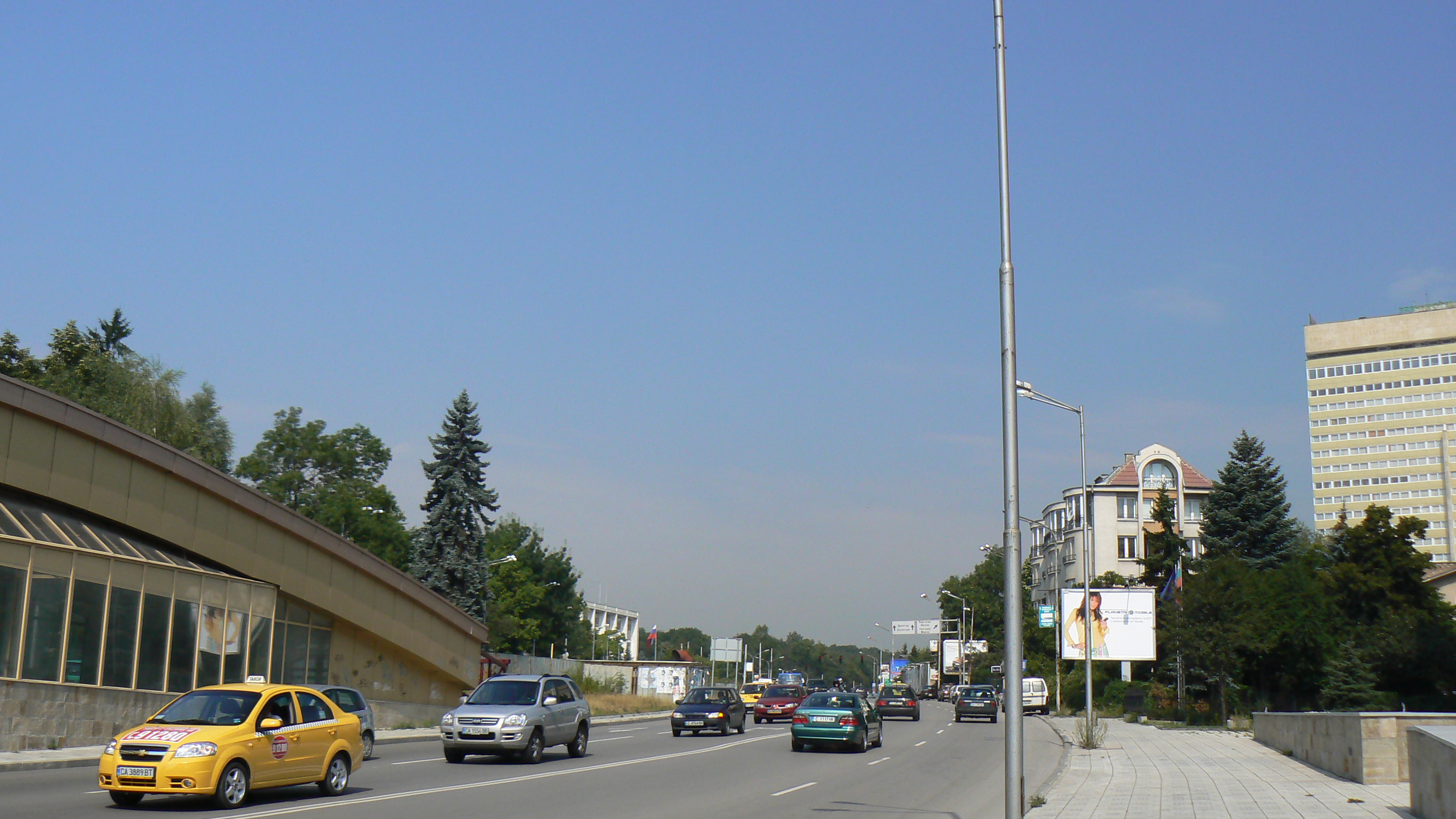
- Interactive map of Dragan Tsankov Blvd
- Length: 3.4 km (2.1 mi)
- Location: Sofia, Sofia City Province, Bulgaria
- West end: Evlogi Georgiev Boulevard
- East end: G. M. Dimitrov Boulevard

Dragan Tsankov Boulevard (Bulgarian: Булевард Драган Цанков) is a large boulevard in the City of Sofia in Sofia City Province, Bulgaria. It is named after the Bulgarian politician Dragan Tsankov. It stretches from the intersection with Evlogi Georgiev Boulevard, north of which it is called Graf Ignatiev Street, and the junction with G. M. Dimitrov Boulevard, south of which it is called St Clement of Ohrid Boulevard. The Perlovska River flows under the boulevard at the junction with Evlogi Georgiev Boulevard.

Landmarks along the boulevard are the Bulgarian National Radio building, Faculty of Biology of the Sofia University, University of Architecture, Civil Engineering and Geodesy, Sofia Municipal Court. The Borisova Gradina TV Tower is located at the junction with Peyo Yavorov Boulevard. From there do the intersection with G. M. Dimitrov Boulevard are situated the Russian Embassy, Park Hotel Moskva, World Trade Center - Sofia, the Transport Police Department of Sofia Police. The red line of the Sofia Metro runs under the boulevard north of Joliot-Curie Metro Station and on a viaduct south of it.
