= Patriarch Evtimiy Boulevard =

Central boulevard in Sofia, Bulgaria

Coordinates: 42°41′20.16″N 23°19′11.48″E

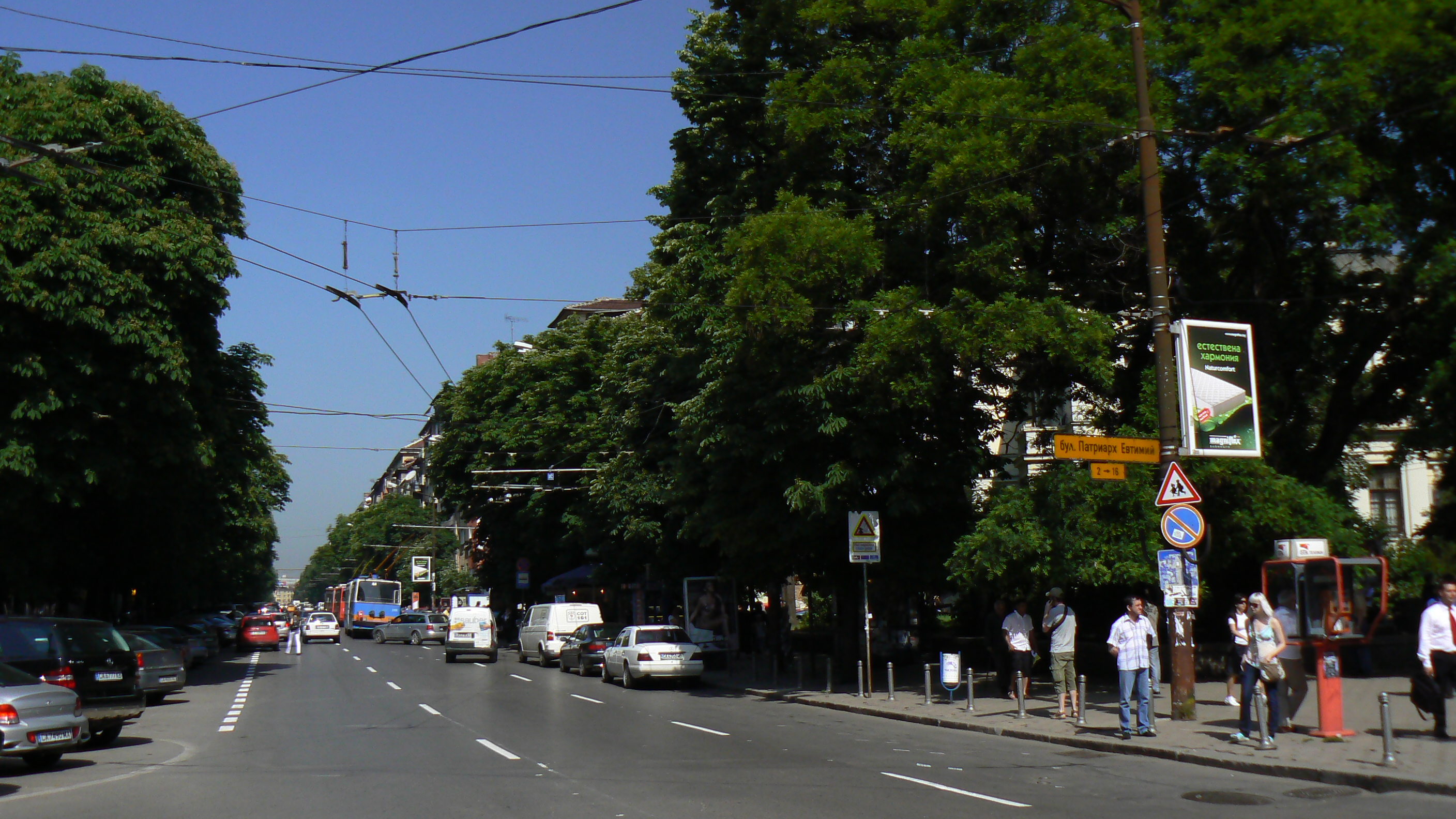
Patriarch Evtimiy Boulevard.

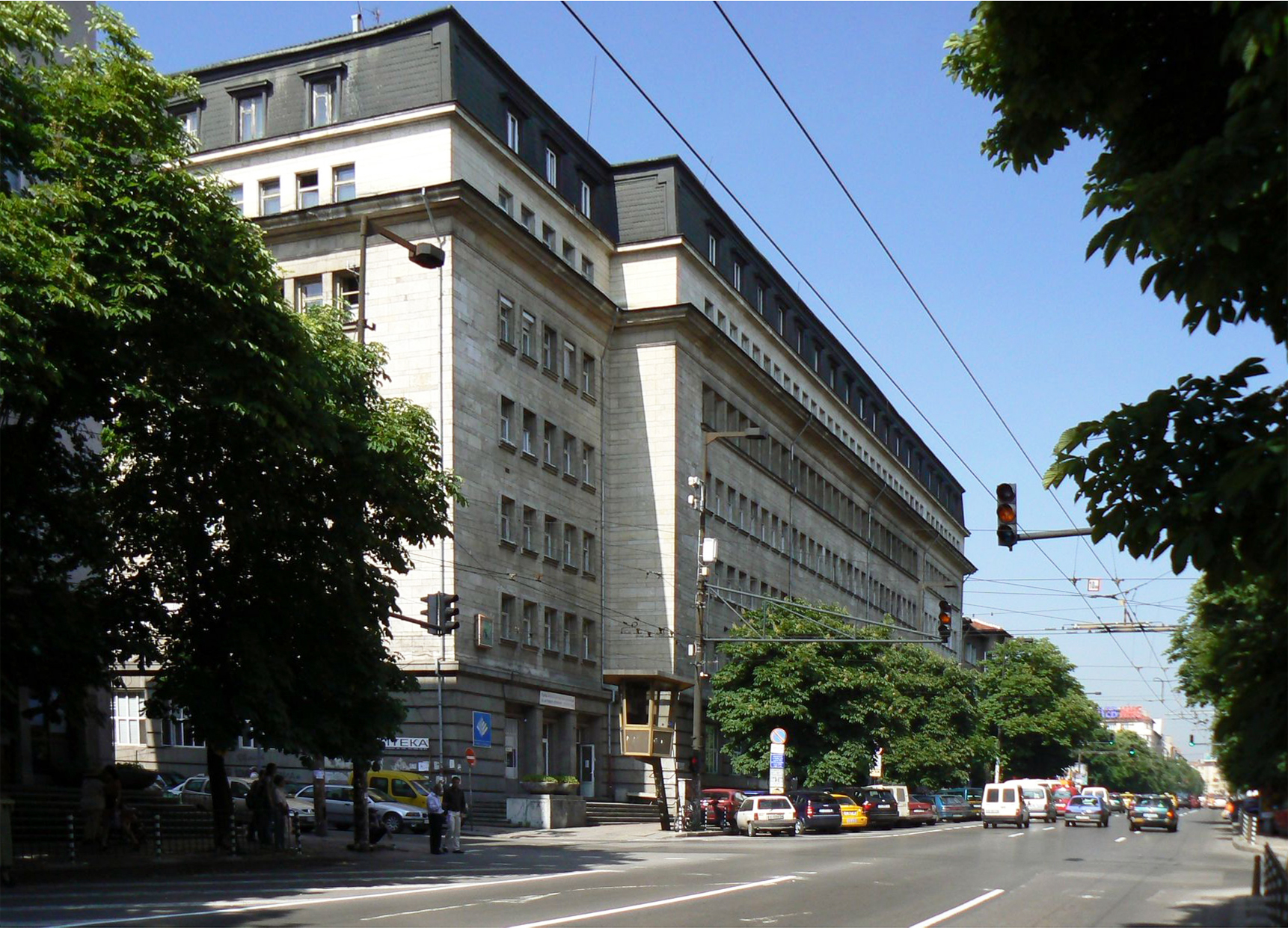
The edifice of the First City Hospital at Patriarch Evtimiy and Rakovska Street.

Patriarch Evtimiy Boulevard (Bulgarian: Булевард Патриарх Евтимий) is a central boulevard in the capital of Bulgaria, Sofia. It is named after the 14th century Bulgarian Patriarch Saint Evtimiy of Tarnovo.

It lies between its crossing with the Vasil Levski Boulevard and Graf Ignatiev Street at the Patriarch Evtimiy Square and the boulevards Praga, Hristo Botev and Skobelev at the Pette kyosheta juncture. Among the most important streets it crosses are the Georgi Rakovski Street, Frityov Nansen Street and Vitosha Boulevard.

Its architecture is typical for Sofia during the 1930s and 1940s - mostly six-storey residential edifices with solid facades and relatively high and spacious flats.

== History ==
The boulevard was reconstructed in the 1970s during the construction of the National Palace of Culture and its park. Until the reconstruction the western part had classical appearance with large trees and a green strip in the middle. The boulevard used to be two-way street until the mid 90s when it became one-way from the Graf Ignatiev Str to the Praga Blvd. The most characteristic transport since the 1930s is the trolley bus No.1 but there are also many other lines.

== Famous buildings ==
Northern side

- Sofia notary's office - a National Monument of Culture built in 1899 in Neo-Renaissance style.
- The Nakashev's pharmacy - on the crossing with the Vitosha Blvd, reconstructed in 1996 and popular place for meetings.
- St Georgi the New of Sofia Church, situated in a small park.

Southern side

- Odeon Cinema
- Lycée Français de Sofia
- First City Hospital
- Between the Frityov Nansen Str and Vitosha Blvd it borders with the park of the National Palace of Culture.
