= Patriarch Evtimiy Square =

Urban square and intersection in Sofia, Bulgaria

- Public square
- {{{other_names}}}
- Площад „Патриарх Евтимий“
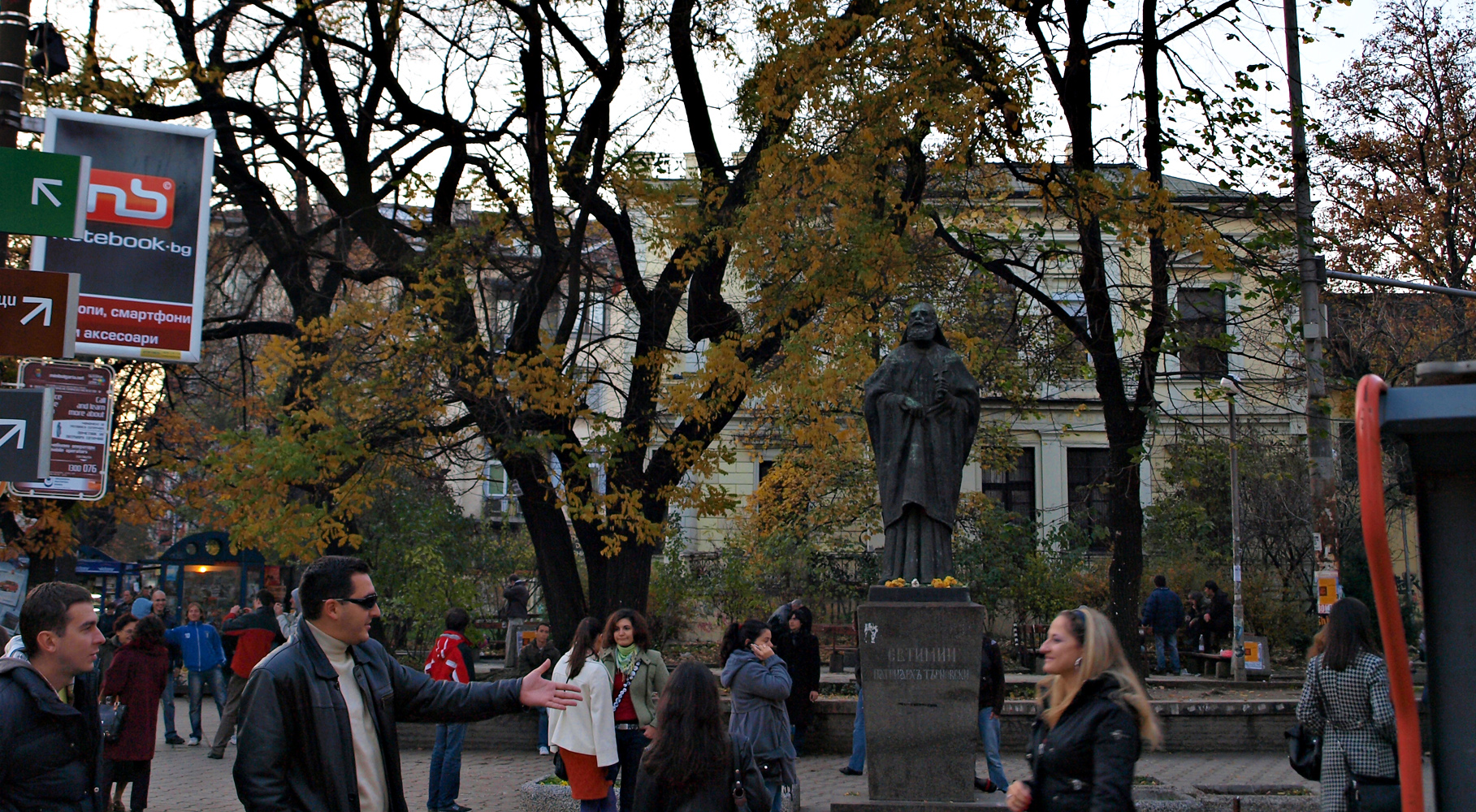
- A rendezvous at Popa, as the square is commonly known
- Owner: Sofia
- Location in Sofia
- Coordinates: 42°41′18″N 23°19′43″E

Patriarch Evtimiy Square (Bulgarian: площад „Патриарх Евтимий“, ploshtad Patriarh Evtimiy), more popularly known as Popa (Попа, "The Priest"), is a small urban square and a busy intersection in the centre of Sofia, the capital of Bulgaria. The square was named after Evtimiy of Tarnovo, Patriarch of Bulgaria from 1375 to 1393 and one of the most important figures of medieval Bulgaria; a monument to Evtimiy by sculptor Marko Markov has adorned the square since 1939.

Patriarch Evtimiy Square is located at the crossing of the car-free Graf Ignatiev Street, Vasil Levski Boulevard and Patriarch Evtimiy Boulevard, which branches off Vasil Levski at the square. Due to its central location, between Sofia University and Orlov most to the east and the National Palace of Culture to the west, it is a very popular meeting point, particularly for teenagers and young adults.

The Odeon Cinema lies in the western part of the square and the Bulgartabac headquarters lie to the south of it. Other nearby landmarks include Slaveykov Square to the north along Graf Ignatiev Street and the Vasil Levski National Stadium to the southeast.

The square is well connected to many parts of Sofia through the nearby tramway, trolleybus and bus stops; many routed taxicabs of the marshrutka network also pass near the square. St. Patriarch Evtimiy Metro Station of Sofia Metro is located under the square.
