= Evlogi and Hristo Georgievi Boulevard =

Boulevard in Sofia, Bulgaria

Evlogi Georgiev Boulevard
- Evlogi Georgiev
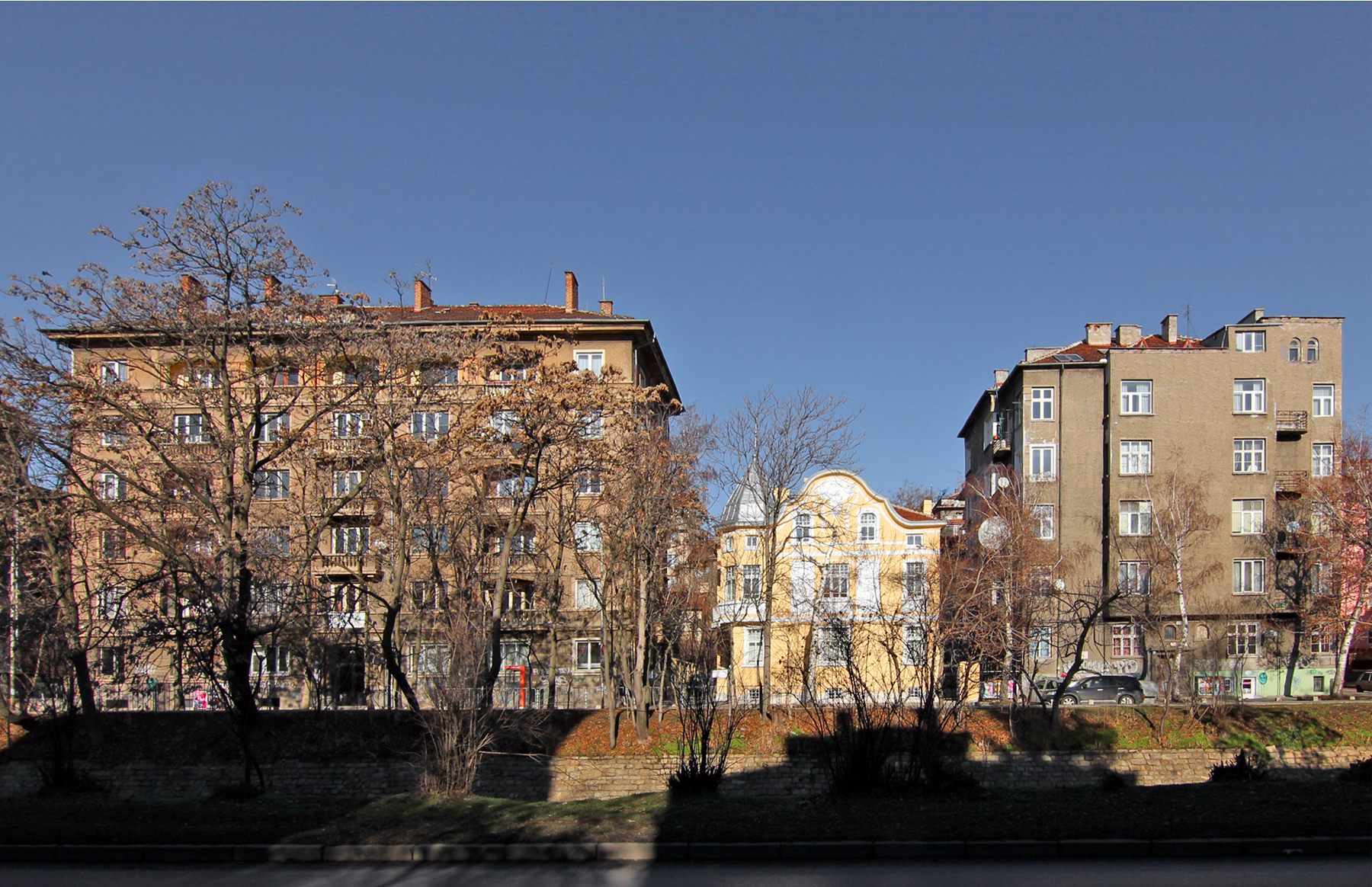
- Interactive map of Evlogi Georgiev Boulevard
- Native name: Булевард Евлоги Георгиев (Bulgarian)
- Namesake: Evlogi and Hristo Georgiev
- Length: 2 km (1.2 mi)
- Location: Sofia, Bulgaria
- Coordinates: 42°41′15″N 23°19′57″E
- From: National Palace of Culture
- To: Gen. Danail Nikolaev Boulevard

Other
- Known for: National Palace of Culture; National Stadium; Tsar Boris III Garden; Eagle's Bridge

Evlogi and Hristo Georgievi Boulevard (Bulgarian: Булевард Евлоги и Христо Георгиеви, usually referred to simply as Evlogi Georgiev, which was its name for most of the 20th Century) is an important boulevard in the Bulgarian capital Sofia. It is named after the Bulgarian entrepreneurs Evlogi and Hristo Georgiev. During Bulgaria's alliance with the Third Reich the street's name was Adolf Hitler Boulevard.

It begins with its intersection with the Cherni Vrah Boulevard and Fridtjof Nansen Street in the area of the National Palace of Culture. To the south of the NPC it is called Bulgaria Boulevard.

Evlogi Georgiev Blvd is crossed by several of the capital's major transport arteries such as the Dragan Tsankov Boulevard and Graf Ignatiev Street (which form one juncture with Evlogi Georgiev) and Tsar Osvoboditel Boulevard and Tsarigrad Road at Orlov Most (which also form one juncture).

Along the boulevard are situated the Vasil Levski National Stadium, 120 High School Georgi S. Rakovski, Pope John Paul II Square, Military Academy G. S. Rakovski, Spanish Language School and others.

For its entire length of around 2 km, the boulevard follows the Perlovska river, with its lanes on either side of the artificially-widened riverbed.
