= Battenberg Mausoleum =

- Мавзолей на Александър I Батенберг
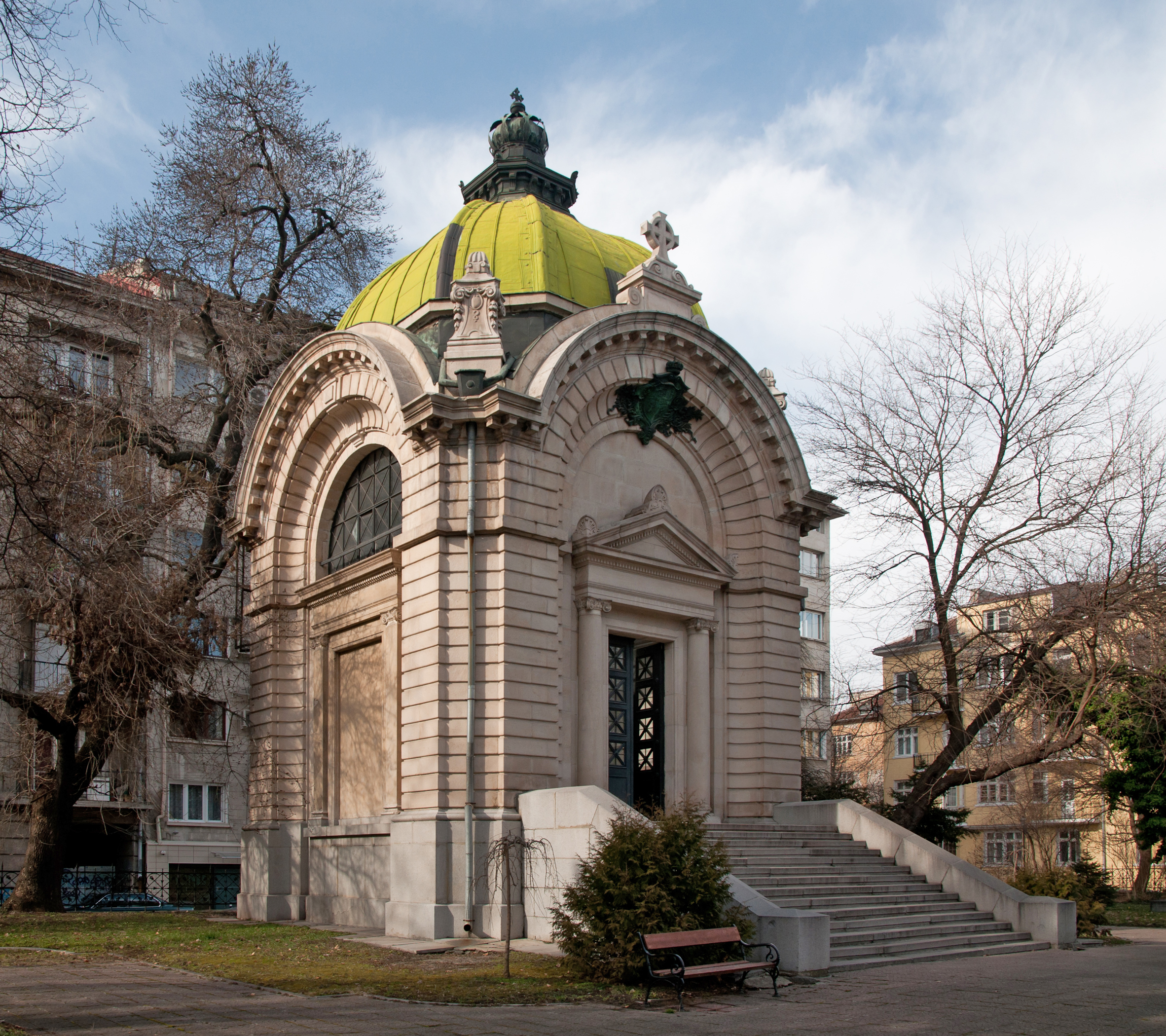

General information
- Status: Open for visits on weekdays
- Type: Mausoleum
- Location: Sofia, Bulgaria
- Address: 81 Vasil Levski Boulevard
- Coordinates: 42°41′29.4″N 23°19′56.8″E
- Completed: 1897

Design and construction
- Architect(s): Heinrich Meyer

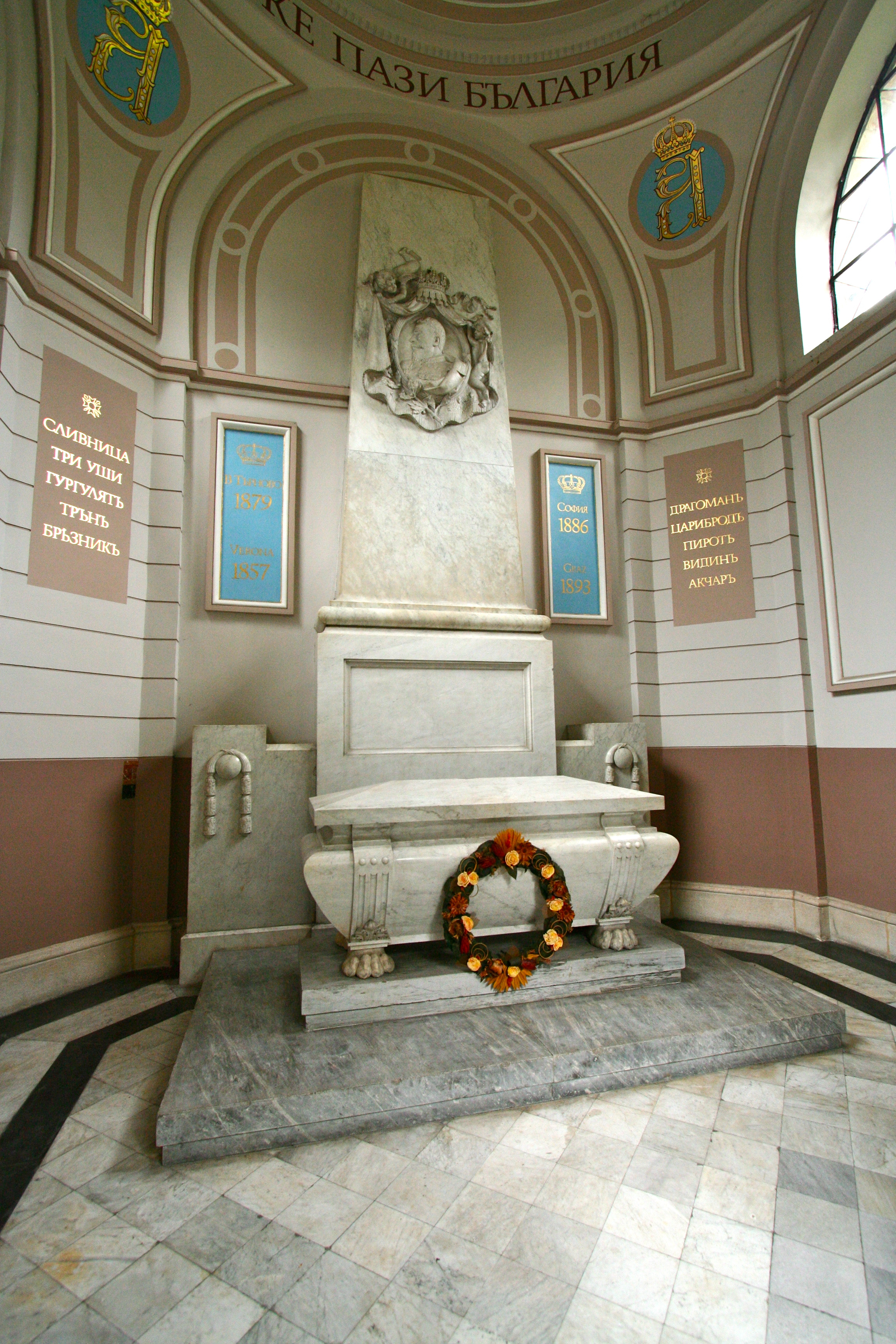
Interior of the mausoleum

The Memorial Tomb of Alexander I of Battenberg (Bulgarian: Гробница паметник „Александър І Батенберг", Grobnitsa pametnik „Aleksandar І Batenberg"), better known as the Battenberg Mausoleum (Мавзолей на Батенберг, Mavzoley na Batenberg) in Sofia, the capital of Bulgaria, is the mausoleum and final resting place of Prince Alexander I of Bulgaria (1857–1893), the first Head of State of modern Bulgaria.

Commissioned to the Swiss architect Hermann Mayer, designed in the eclectic style (with prominent elements of Neo-Baroque and Neoclassicism) and opened in 1897, the mausoleum measures 11 metres in height and 80 square metres in area. The interior was painted by the noted Bulgarian artist Haralampi Tachev. The Battenberg Mausoleum is located at 81 Vasil Levski Boulevard. It was partially restored in 2005.

When Alexander died in exile in Graz, Austria in 1893, he was initially buried there. However, in accordance with his wish, his remains were transferred to the Bulgarian capital. He was given a state funeral attended by the new prince, Ferdinand of Bulgaria, Alexander's widow Johanna Loisinger, and a great number of Bulgarians. Following a service in the St Nedelya Church his body was moved to the Church of St George and subsequently to the newly constructed mausoleum in the centre of the city.

The mausoleum was closed between 1947 and 1991, during the period of Communist rule in Bulgaria, but was subsequently reopened for the public. Today it also exhibits some of Alexander's private possessions and papers, donated by his wife in 1937.
