= Boyanska reka =

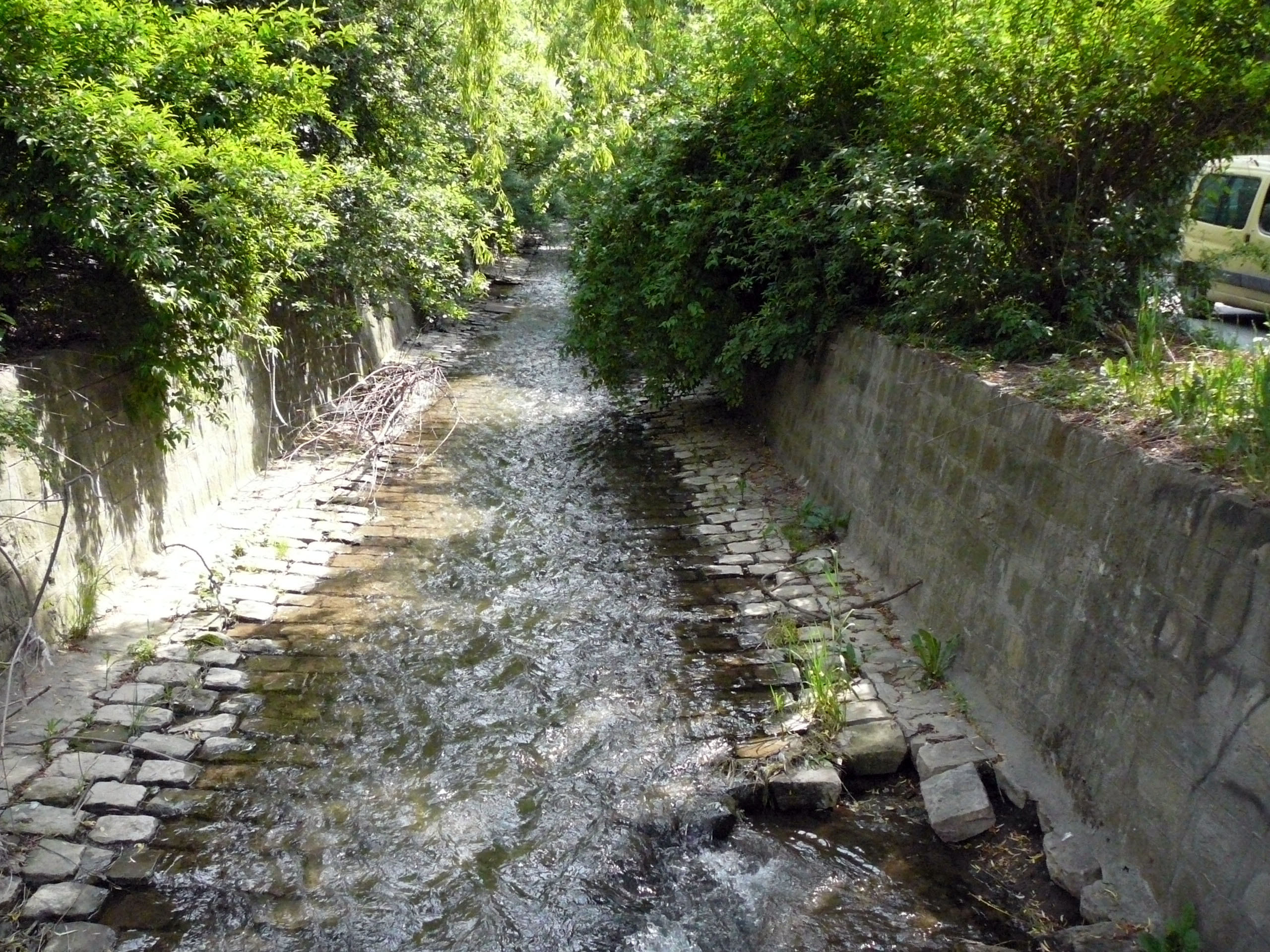
- Boyanska reka in Buxton
- Native name: Боянска река (Bulgarian)

Physical characteristics
- Source
  - location: Vitosha
  - coordinates: 42.5706°N 23.2854°E
  - elevation: 2,170 m
- Mouth
  - location: Perlovska
  - coordinates: 42.6816°N 23.3157°E
  - elevation: 578 m
- Length: 46 km

Basin features
- Progression: Perlovska→ Iskar→ Danube→ Black Sea

The Boyanska reka (Bulgarian: Боянска река, "Boyana river") is a river in western Bulgaria, a left tributary to the river Perlovska.

The river flows from the northern slopes of Cherni Vrah in Vitosha Mountain, crossing Torfeno Branishte Nature Reserve; at the northern foothills of Vitosha the river drops abruptly forming the Boyana waterfall and then crosses the village of Boyana (suburb of Sofia, from which the river takes its name) to flow through various neighborhoods of the capital Sofia, partially underneath the city, to finally flow into Perlovska river, near the National Palace of Culture, in the central part of Sofia.

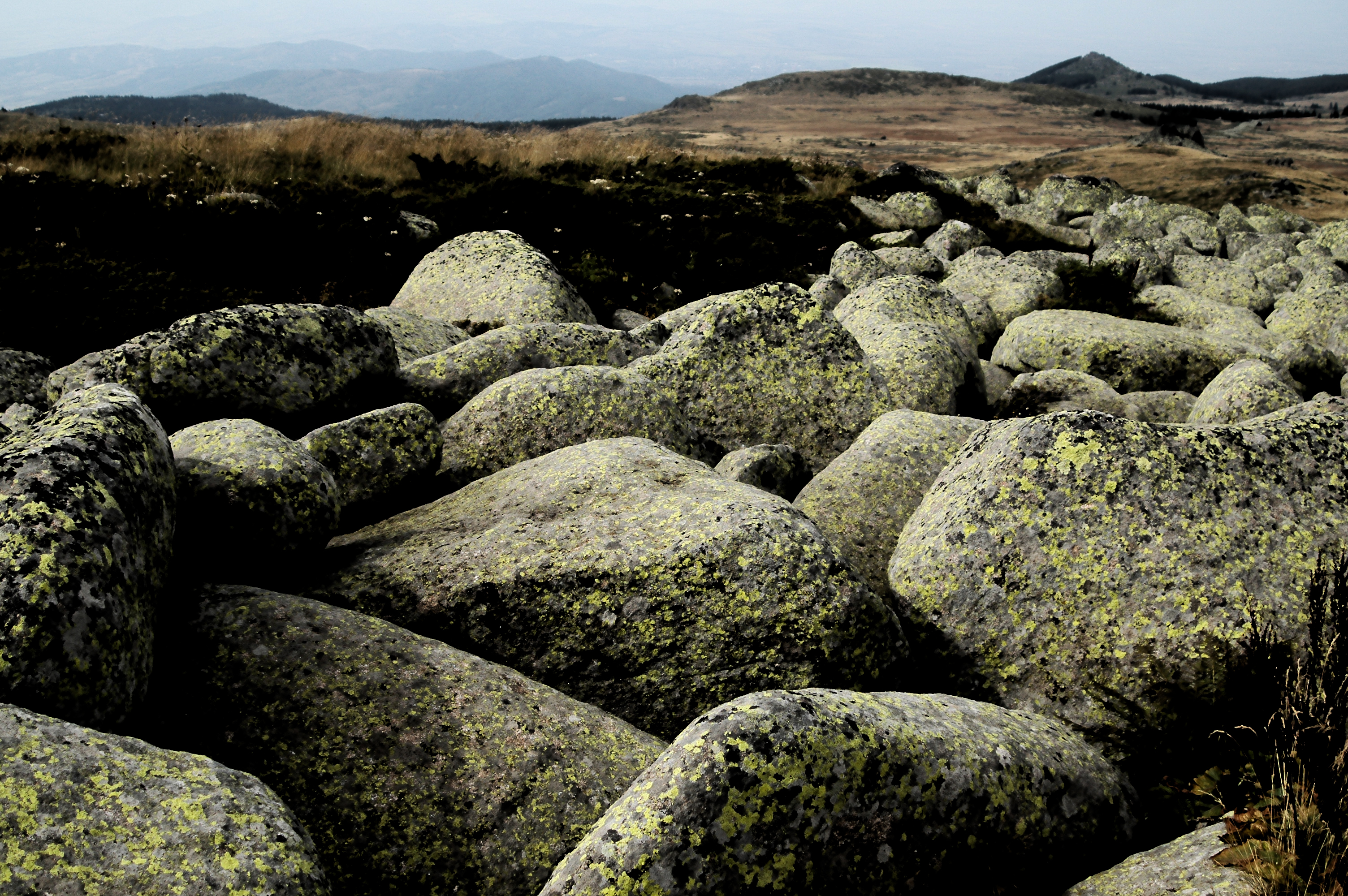
The upper course of Boyanska River flowing beneath a stone run on Vitosha Plateau

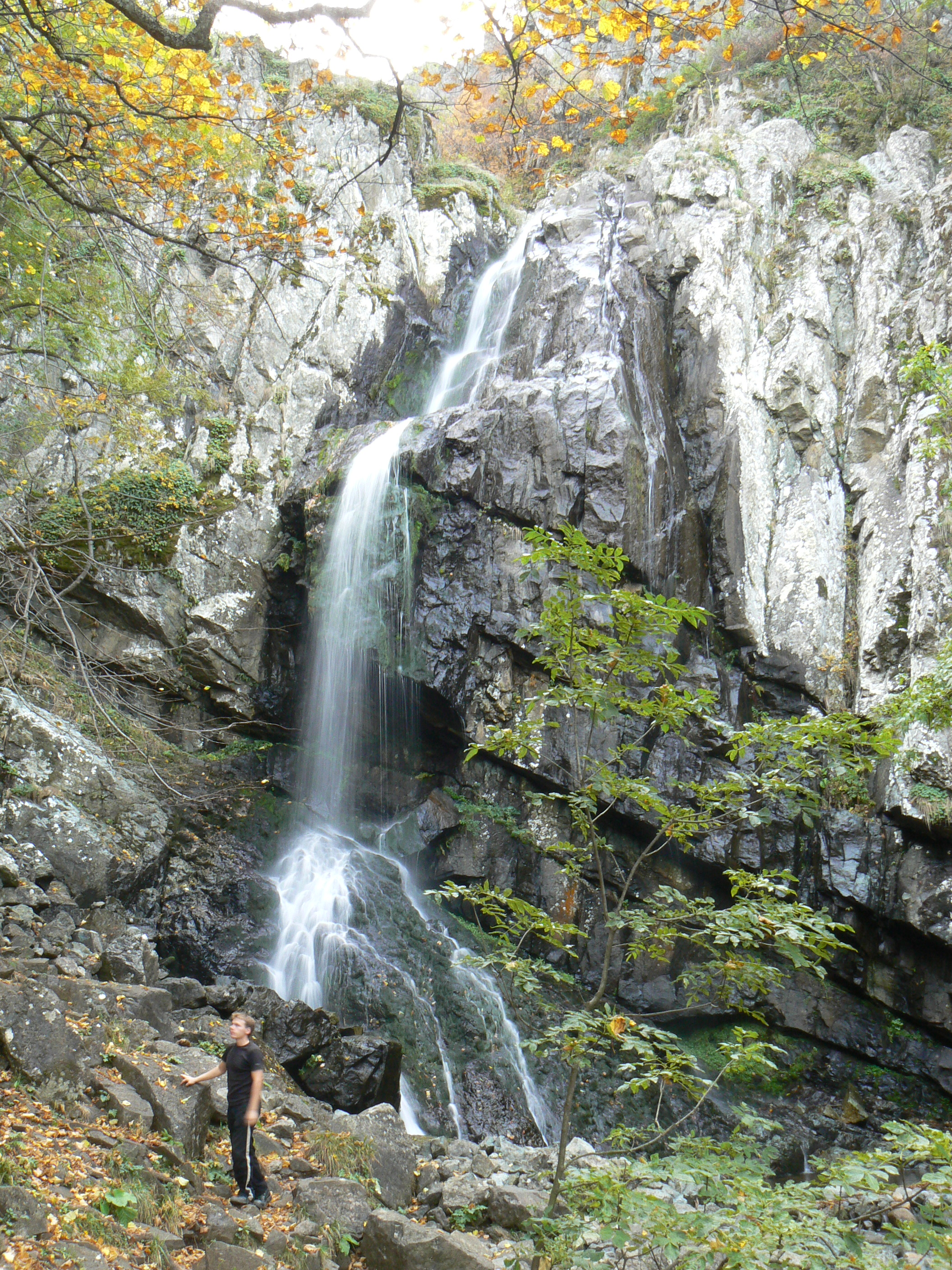
The river at Boyana Waterfall
