= Ruzha Lazarova =

Bulgarian French language writer

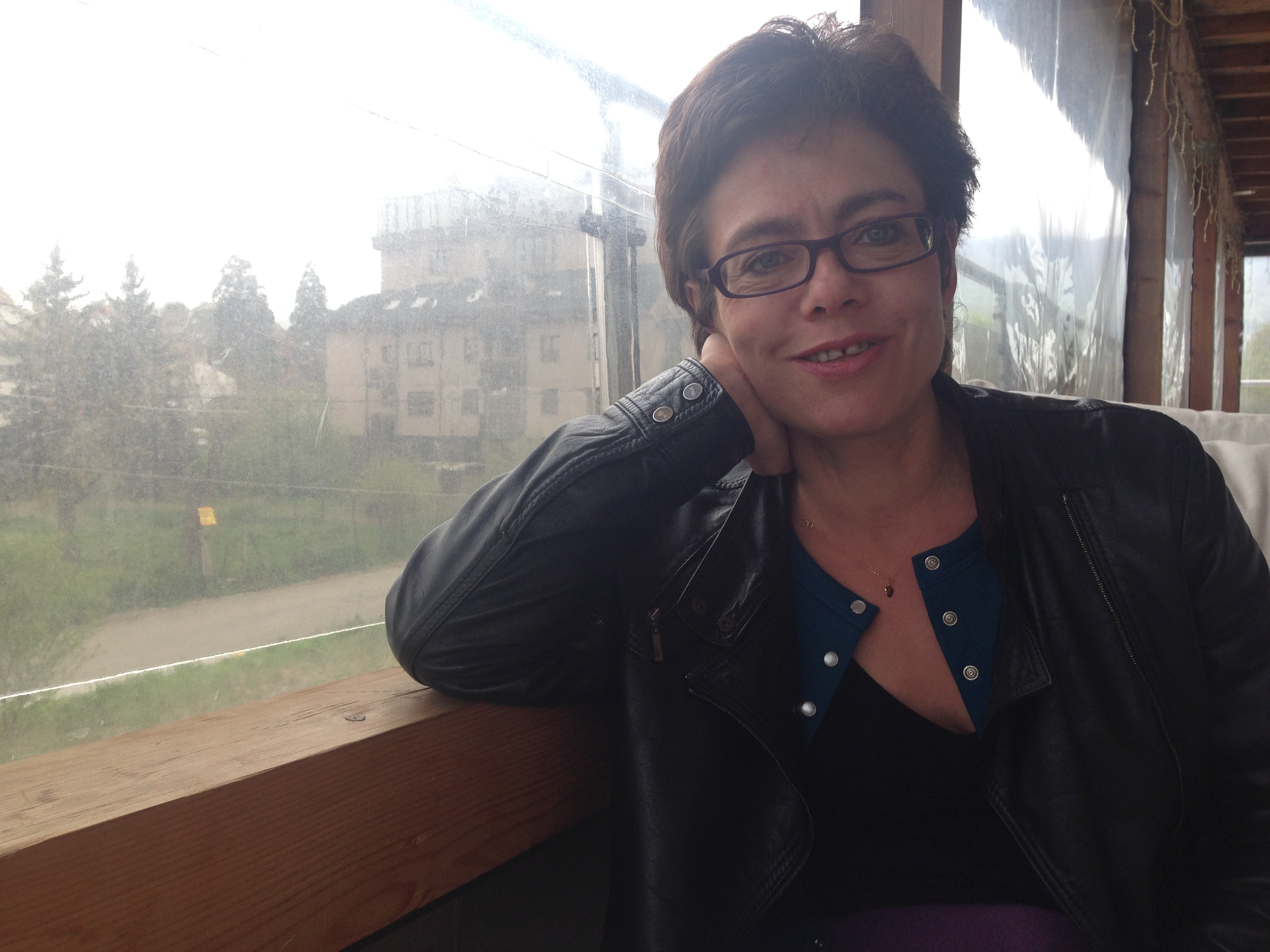

Ruzha Lazarova (Bulgarian: Ружа Лазарова; Sofia, 1968) is a Bulgarian French language writer who currently lives in Paris.

She studied at the Lycée Français de Sofia and she later studied French literature at the Sofia University. She started publishing short stories in Bulgarian and was awarded with Young Prose Bulgarian Prize in 1990. She has also published two short stories in French and a play, which was performed at the “Festival de la Correspondance” in Grignan.

== Novels ==
- Sur le bout de la langue (1998)
- Cœurs croisés (Flammarion, 2000)
- Frein (Balland, 2004)
- Mausolée (Flammarion, 2009)
