= Vasil Levski Boulevard =

Boulevard in Sofia, Bulgaria

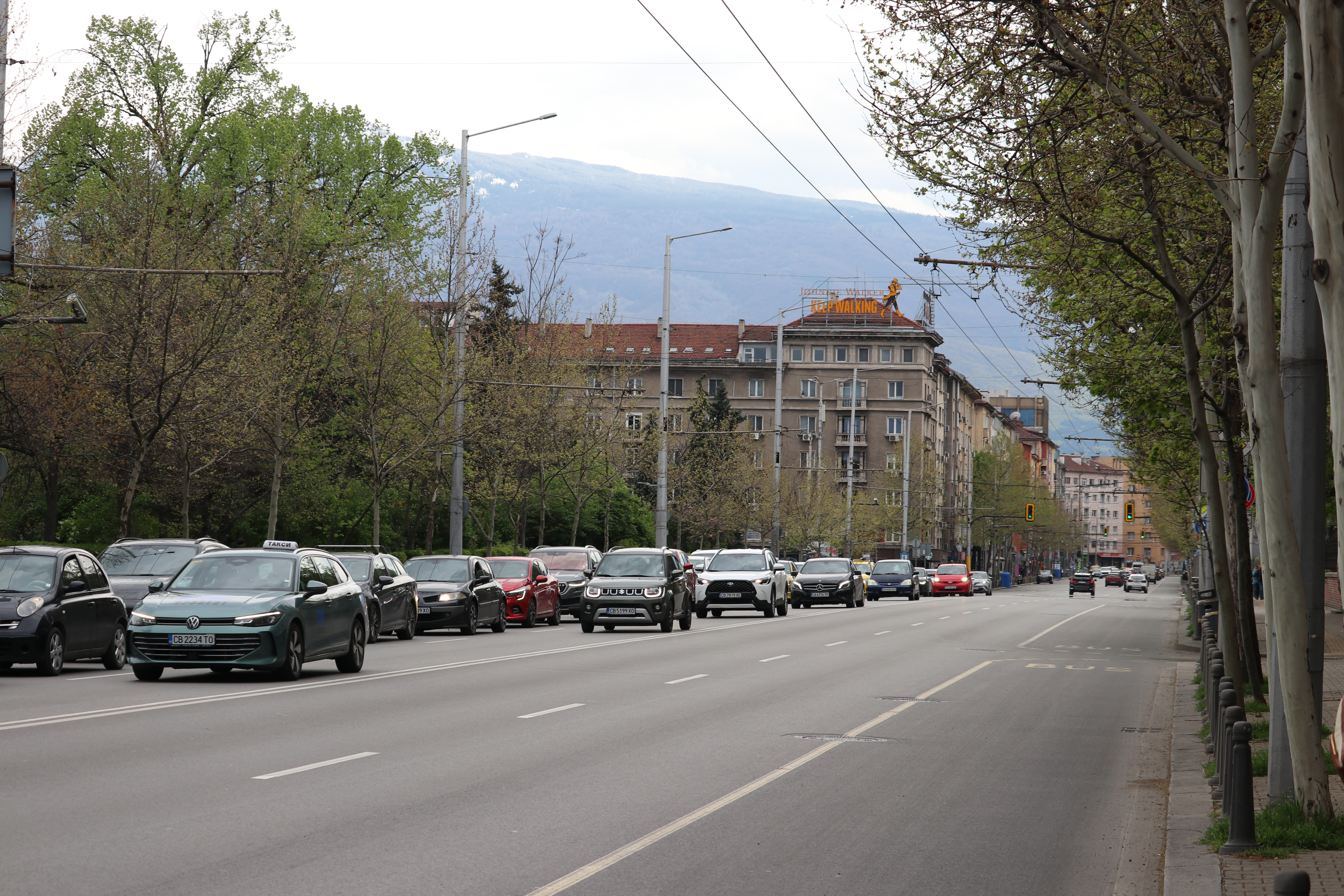
- Interactive map of Vasil Levski Boulevard
- Length: 3.7 km (2.3 mi)
- Width: 18 m
- Location: Sofia
- Coordinates: 42°41′41″N 23°20′5″E
- North end: Stochna gara Sq.
- South end: National Palace of Culture

Vasil Levski Boulevard (Bulgarian: Булевард Васил Левски) is a major boulevard in Sofia, Bulgaria. It is named after Bulgaria's national hero Vasil Levski. Important landmarks include the national library.

== Location ==
The north terminus of the boulevard is Stochna gara Square (Freight station square), connecting it to the Slivnitsa and Danail Nikolaev Boulevards. The south terminus ends near the National Palace of Culture.

Some of the most prominent landmarks of the capital are situated along the boulevard, including the National Academy of Art, SS. Cyril and Methodius National Library, Sofia University, the State Agency of Youth and Sports, Battenberg Mausoleum, the Monument to Vasil Levski and others.

Vasil Levski Boulevard crosses several of the city's vital transport arteries, such as Georgi Rakovski Street, Tsar Osvoboditel Boulevard at Sofia University, Patriarch Evtimiy Boulevard and Graf Ignatiev Street at Patriarch Evtimiy Square.

== Transport ==
A number of public bus and trolleybus lines run alongside the boulevard, as well as being crossed by a tram line (Running along Graf Ignatiev street). Additionally, there are two stations of the Sofia Metro along the boulevard - SU St. Kliment Ohridski and St. Patriarch Evtimiy, belonging to lines 1/4 and 3 respectively.

The intersection of Vasil Levski and General Gurko Boulevards. (Vasil Levski boulevard passing horizontally)

== Gallery ==
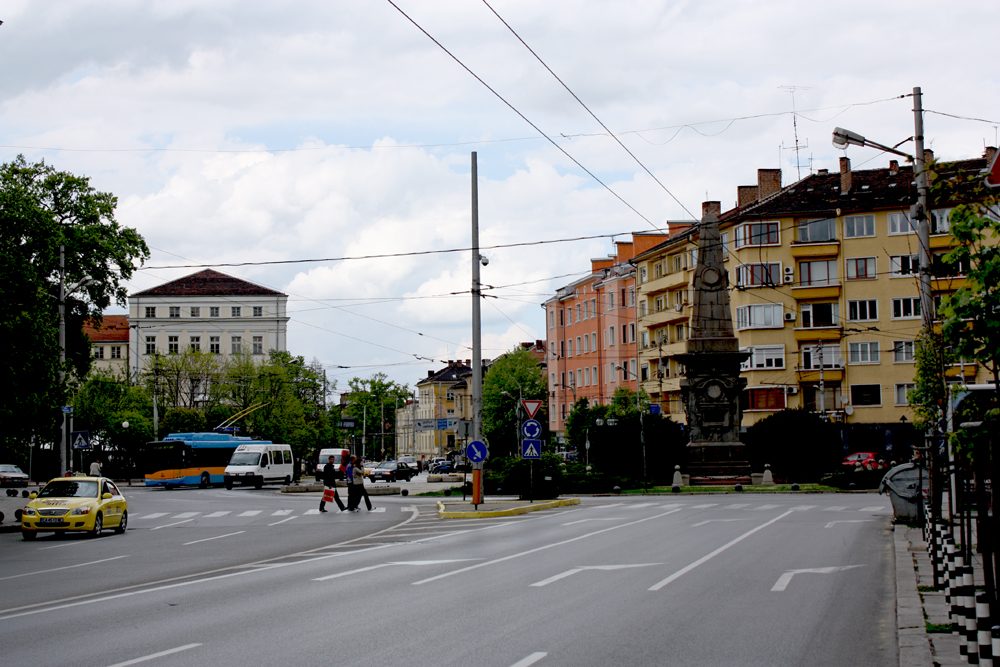
Vasil Levski Square and monument

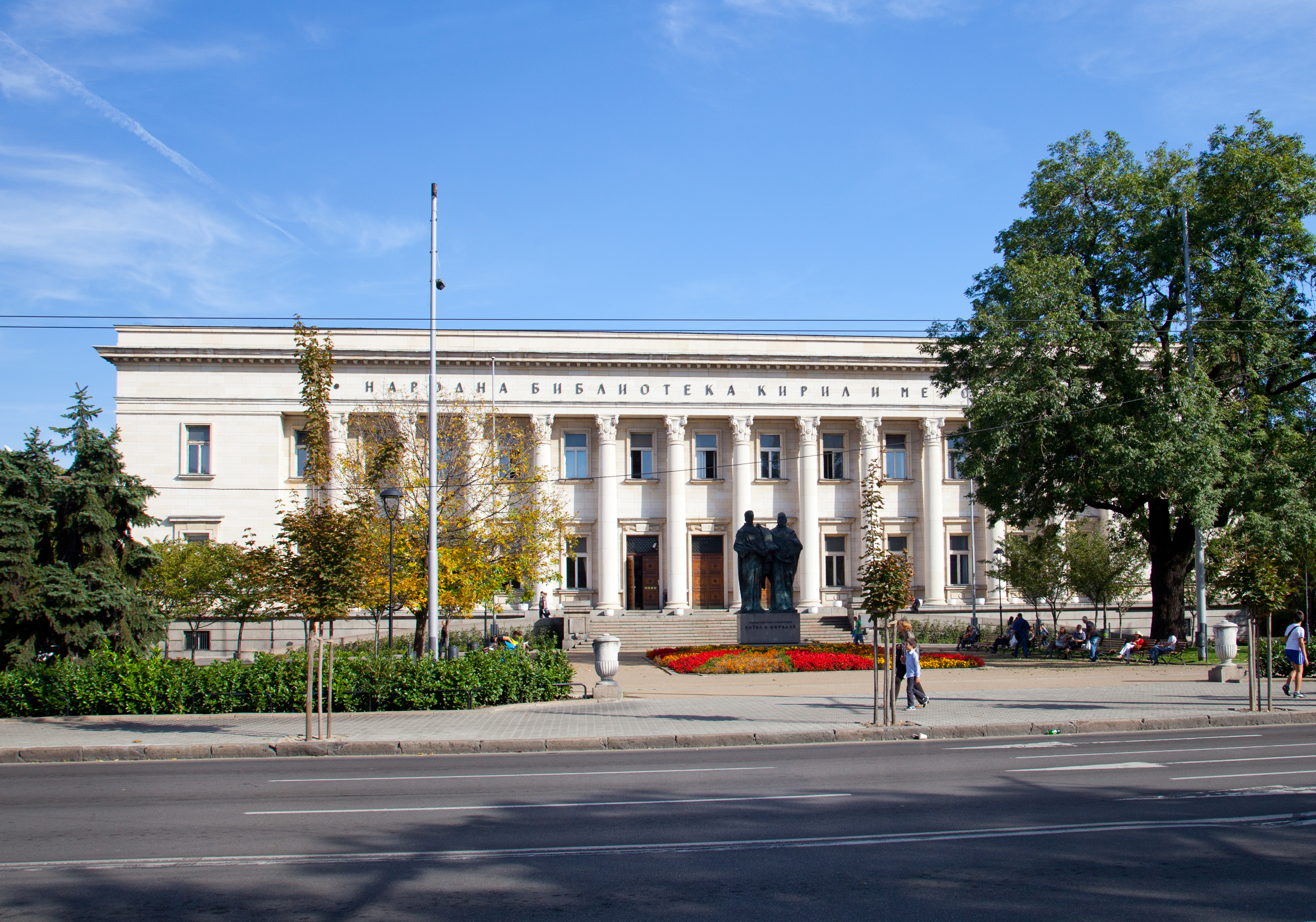
SS. Cyril and Methodius National Library

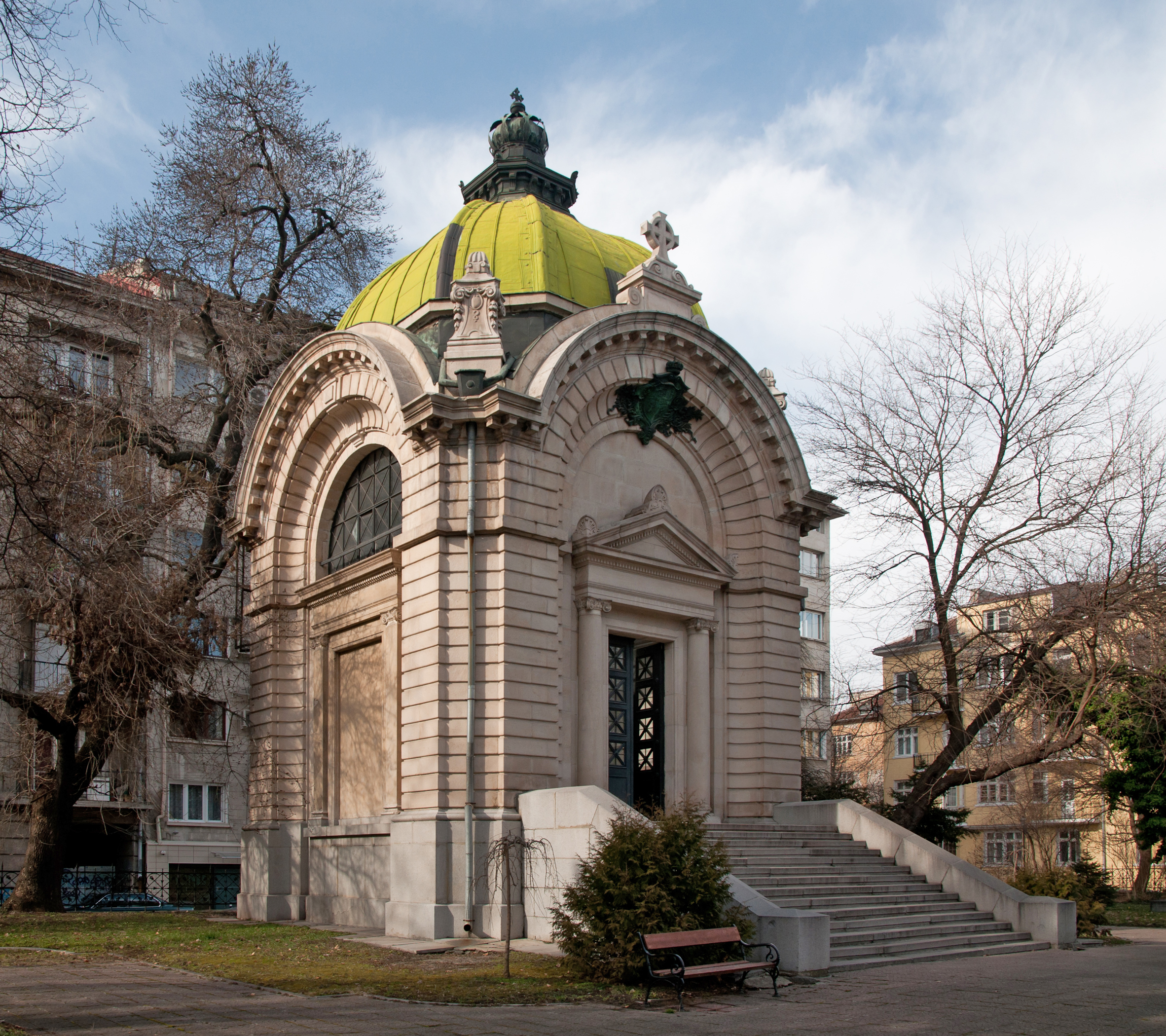
Battenberg Mausoleum
