= Dimiter Tzantchev =

Bulgarian diplomat

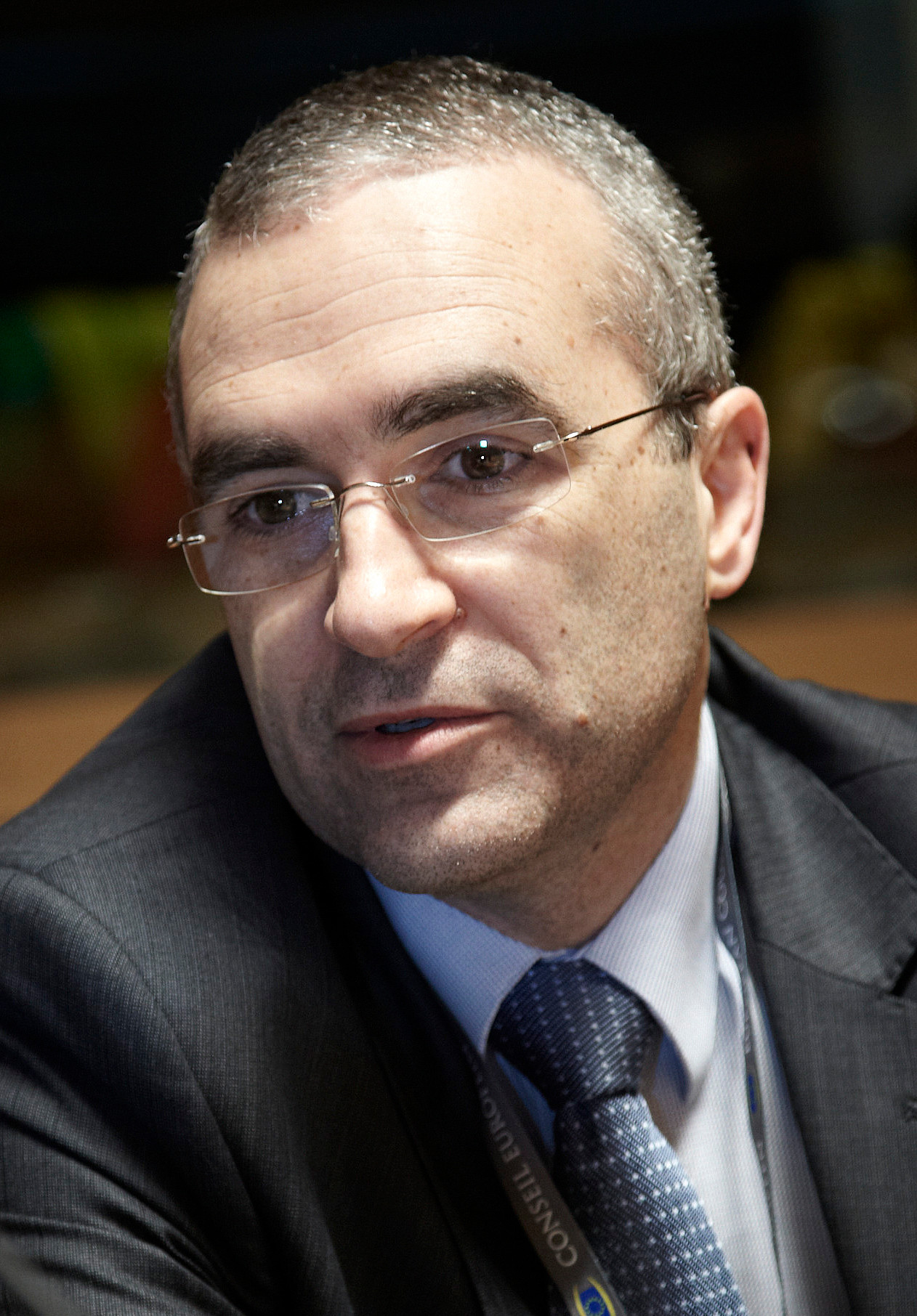
Tzantchev in 2012

Dimiter Tzantchev (Bulgarian: Димитър Цанчев) is a European diplomat, Ambassador, Head of European Union (EU) delegation to Morocco, (after previously representing the EU in the State of Israel). He joined the European external action service after a long and distinguished career in the Bulgarian diplomatic service. He was Bulgaria's Ambassador to the EU, the UN in Geneva and to Israel. Tzantchev was President of COREPER II (Committee of the Permanent Representatives of the EU) - January 1 - June 30, 2018 during the first ever Bulgarian rotational presidency of the Council of the EU. One of the longest serving Permanent Representatives to EU in Brussels (nine and a half years) he was also the Dean of COREPER II from August 2017 until September 2021.

Born in Sofia, Bulgaria on September 28, 1966. His father, Tzantcho Tzantchev (Tsancho Tsanchev) was a renowned director of photography in the Bulgarian cinema who has created some of the most popular Bulgarian films in 1960's, 1970's and 1980's. In his childhood Dimiter appeared in supporting roles in some of his father's films. His mother Lidia originates from the oldest founding families in the well known neighborhoods of the Bulgarian capital's Sofia Boyana and Gorna Banya. Married to Stanislava Tzantcheva, they have a son Konstantin and a daughter Elena.

== Education ==
1985 - graduated with Gold medal (summa cum laude) from the Lycée Français de Sofia. 1992 - Master of Art (M.A.) in Arab studies from Sofia University "Saint Kliment Ohridski", graduated summa cum laude. 2002 - Master of Laws (LL.M.), specialized in International law and international relations, from Sofia University "Saint Kliment Ohridski". 2006 - graduated from the High Level course of the European Security and Defense College in Brussels.

== Postgraduate training and specialization ==
1995 - specialization in Diplomatic practice and International negotiations at the Institut International d'Administration Publique in Paris (merged with the Ecole Nationale d'Administration).
2004-2005 - training courses in Chairing international meetings, UN documentation and Negotiation skills at the UNITAR (United Nations Institute for Training and Research).

== Diplomatic career ==
2025 — Ambassador, Head of EU Delegation to Morocco.
2021-2025 — Ambassador, Head of EU Delegation to the State of Israel
2012-2021 — Ambassador, Permanent representative of the Republic of Bulgaria to the European Union.
2010-2012 — Vice-Minister of Foreign affairs of the Republic of Bulgaria, Chair of the National Committee UNESCO.
2008-2010 — Ambassador Extraordinary and Plenipotentiary of the Republic of Bulgaria to the State of Israel.
2005-2008 — Spokesperson of the Ministry of Foreign affairs of the Republic of Bulgaria.
2005 — Head of NATO and ESDP Department at the Ministry of Foreign affairs of the Republic of Bulgaria.
2002-2005 — Ambassador, Permanent representative of the Republic of Bulgaria to the United Nations Office and the other international organizations in Geneva.
2001-2002 — Foreign Policy Secretary to the President of the Republic of Bulgaria Petar Stoyanov.
1999-2001 — Head of Middle East and North Africa Department at the Ministry of Foreign affairs of the Republic of Bulgaria.
1996-1999 — Deputy Head of Mission, Head of the Political Affairs and Press section at the Embassy of the Republic of Bulgaria in Israel
1993-1996 — Desk Officer for Iraq and Gulf countries at the Ministry of Foreign affairs of the Republic of Bulgaria
1992-1993 — Editor at the Bulgarian National Radio

== Positions in International organizations ==
Vice-president of the United Nations Compensations Committee - 2002–2004.
President of the Trade and Development Board of UNCTAD - 2002–2003.
President of the Coordination Committee of WIPO - 2003–2004.
Chair of the 5th Conference on the conventional weapons - 2003.
Member of the Governing Board of the Geneva Center for Security Policy (GCSP) - 2002–2005.
Member of the Governing Board of the center for democratic control on the armed forces (DECAF) - 2003–2005.

== Acting career as child ==
Supporting role as Prince Svetoslav Terter's nephew in the film Князът ("The Prince"), 1970, dir. Petar B. Vasilev
Recurring role as Kircho in the film Фильо и Макензен ("Filyo I Makenzen"), 1978, dir. Dimitar Petrov
Supporting role as Railway worker's son in the film Топло ("Toplo"), 1979, dir. Vladimir Yanchev
