= American Girls' College in Lovech, Bulgaria =

The American Girls’ College in Lovech, Bulgaria was established on December 18, 1881 by the protestant Rev. J. C. Challis. It first opened doors in Troyan in 1880. After the end of the first school year Rev. Challis decided that it would be better if the school were located in the town of Lovech. Initially the school had only nine students and one teacher- Mr. Challis. In Lovech the school was in a small house with just one room and a hallway, which were used for both teaching and cooking. For the second school year there are twelve students and three teachers. In 1882 the first school building was built on its own land. Students from 1st to 6th grade were taught in the school.

In 1892 Miss Kate B. Blackburn is assigned for a director of the school, it starts growing significantly. Two boarding houses are built to accommodate the needs of the students. The number of students increases daily. During the First World War all American teachers are forced to leave Bulgaria. The director during that period (1914–1918) is Miss Maryika Raicheva. In 1918 Miss Blackburn returns as the principal. The popularity of the school actually booms after the wars. New missionary teachers come to work in the school. The government recognized it as a semi-classic girls college. In 1900 Miss Dora Davis arrives as a new teacher. At that point the school teaches 7th graders as well.

The school differed from many contemporary schools at that that time. The religious beliefs of all the students were acknowledged and each Sunday they were taken to the church of their belonging. The girls had the opportunity to participate in different clubs in order to develop their personalities. Supporters of the school expressed appreciation for the work that the American teachers were doing. Evidence for that were the numerous thank you letters, the donations and the popularity of the school.

In 1922 the school teaches students up to 11th grade. In 1923 Miss Davis and Miss Blackburn leave and are replaced by Miss Edith Perry, Miss Fern Perry, and Mrs. Florence Reeves. In 1926 due to the high interest in the school, the Young Women’s Christian Association, that is responsible for the girls’ college in Lovech built two additional buildings. Those buildings accommodate the classrooms, the theatre room, exercise room, principal’s office, etc.

On June 3, 1927 the first school holiday is celebrated. Since that day the major universities in the country recognize the diplomas issued in the American girls’ college in Lovech. Between 1923 and 1930 the teachers and principles of the school changed very often. From 1930 until 1940 Miss Mellony Turner is principal of the school. In 1941 Bulgaria declare war to the United States and all missionaries have to leave the school. After World War II Miss Turner is allowed to continue teaching. She is publicly attacked by the official communist paper of Bulgaria for her work and forced to leave the country. Under her guidance the school accomplishes some of its biggest achievements. The communist party decides to close down all foreign language schools. As a result in 1948 the American girls’ college in Lovech is closed down.

On February 15, 1950 the school is resurrected as a Foreign language high school Ekzarh Joseph I. It is the first and the oldest language high school in Bulgaria.
