= Perlovska =

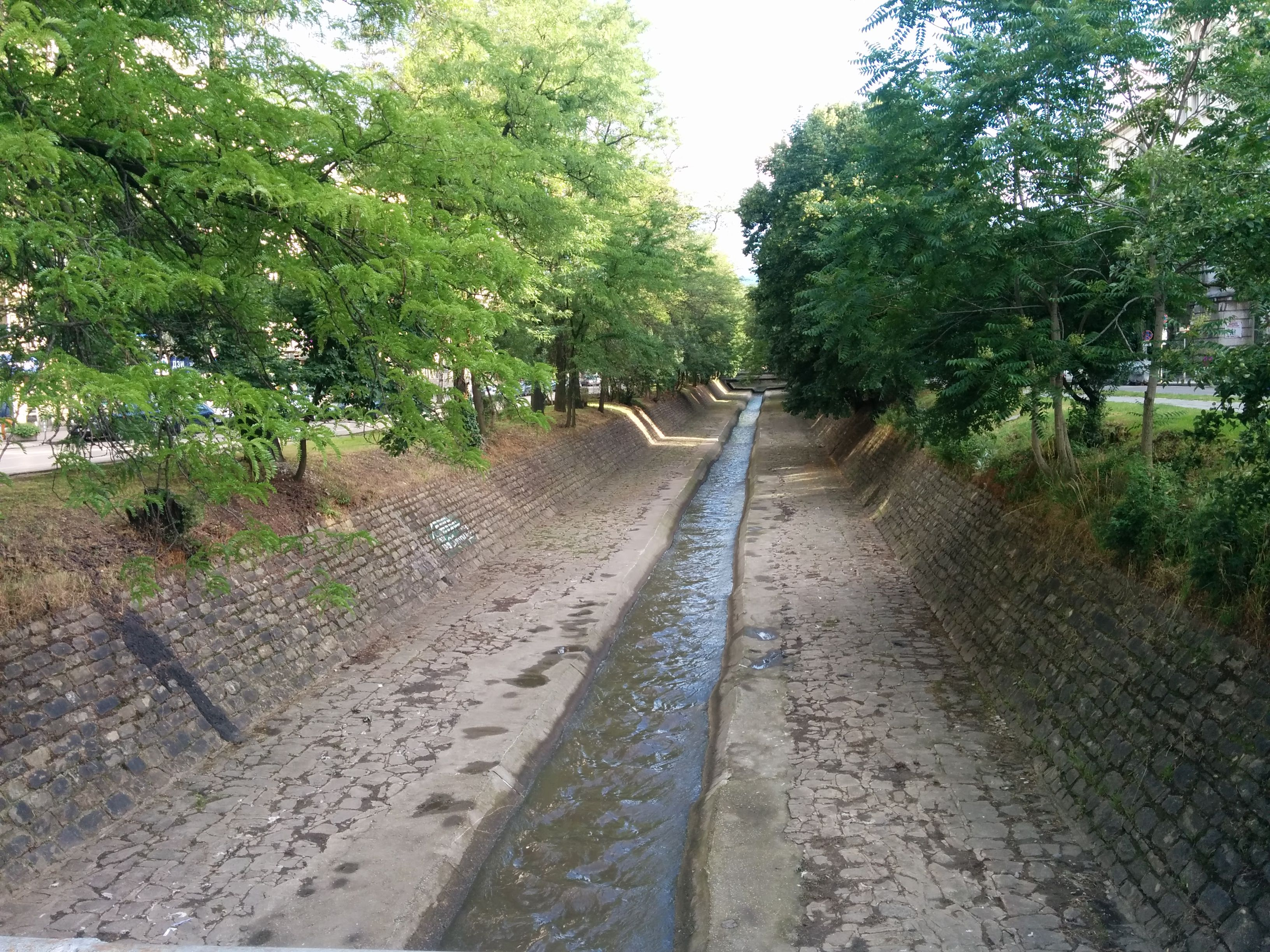
- Native name: Перловска река (Bulgarian)

Location
- Country: Bulgaria
- City: Sofia

Physical characteristics
- Source
  - location: Dragalevtsi
  - coordinates: 42.6307°N 23.2962°E
  - elevation: 820 m
- Mouth
  - location: Iskar
  - coordinates: 42.7558°N 23.3784°E
  - elevation: 513 m
- Length: 31 km (19 mi)
- Basin size: 257 km^{2} (99 mi^{2})

Basin features
- Progression: Iskar→ Danube→ Black Sea

Perlovska river (Bulgarian: Перловска река) is a river in the Sofia Valley in western Bulgaria. The river is 31 km long. It takes its source from the foothills of Vitosha mountain range, runs through the capital Sofia's South Park, separates the two lanes of Evlogi Georgiev Boulevard, runs through the neighbourhood Poduyane, and finally flows into the river Iskar.

== Geography ==
Perlovska springs from the villa zone of Dragalevtsi just south of the capital at an altitude of 820 m, crosses the Sofia Ring Road, connects the new neighborhoods, parallel to Bulgaria Boulevard, and then crosses the South Park. Under the Bulgaria Boulevard, the river receives its main tributary, the Boyanska reka, and resurfaces at Evlogi and Hristo Georgievi Boulevard. From there the Perlovska becomes a canal. In the city the course of the river is completely corrected, in places underground. It flows to the left into the Iskar at 513 m above sea level, 1.2 km northeast of the Obradovski Monastery.

Its drainage basin covers a territory of 257 km^{2} or 3.0% of the catchment area of the Iskar. The largest tributary is the Vladayska reka (left). The river has high water in April–June, due to the snowmelt in Vitosha, and low water in August–October.

The Geographic Dictionary of Bulgaria and the maps of the Geographic Information System – Sofia accept the Boyanska reka, which takes its source at an altitude of 2,170 m, as part of Perlovaska and as its main stem.

The Perlovska is one of the several small rivers that flow through Sofia. It forms the northern border of Lozenets District of the capital. The most famous landmark on the river is the Eagles' Bridge, the starting point of Sofia's largest boulevard, Tsarigradsko shose. The Perlovska is often referred to by the locals as "The Canal", which is reflected in derivative names such as the Small City Theater "Behind the Canal".

== Gallery ==
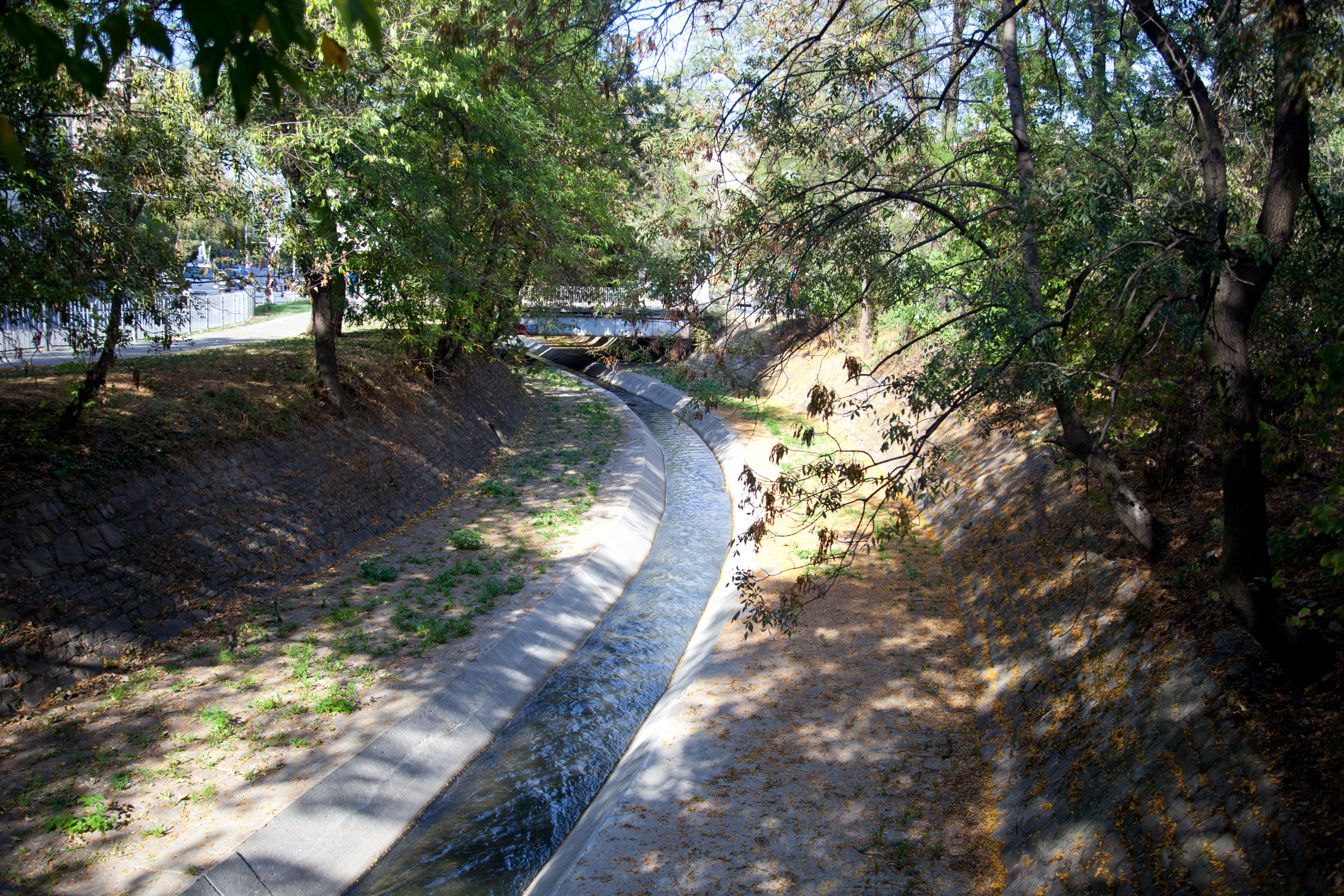
Riverbed in Sofia

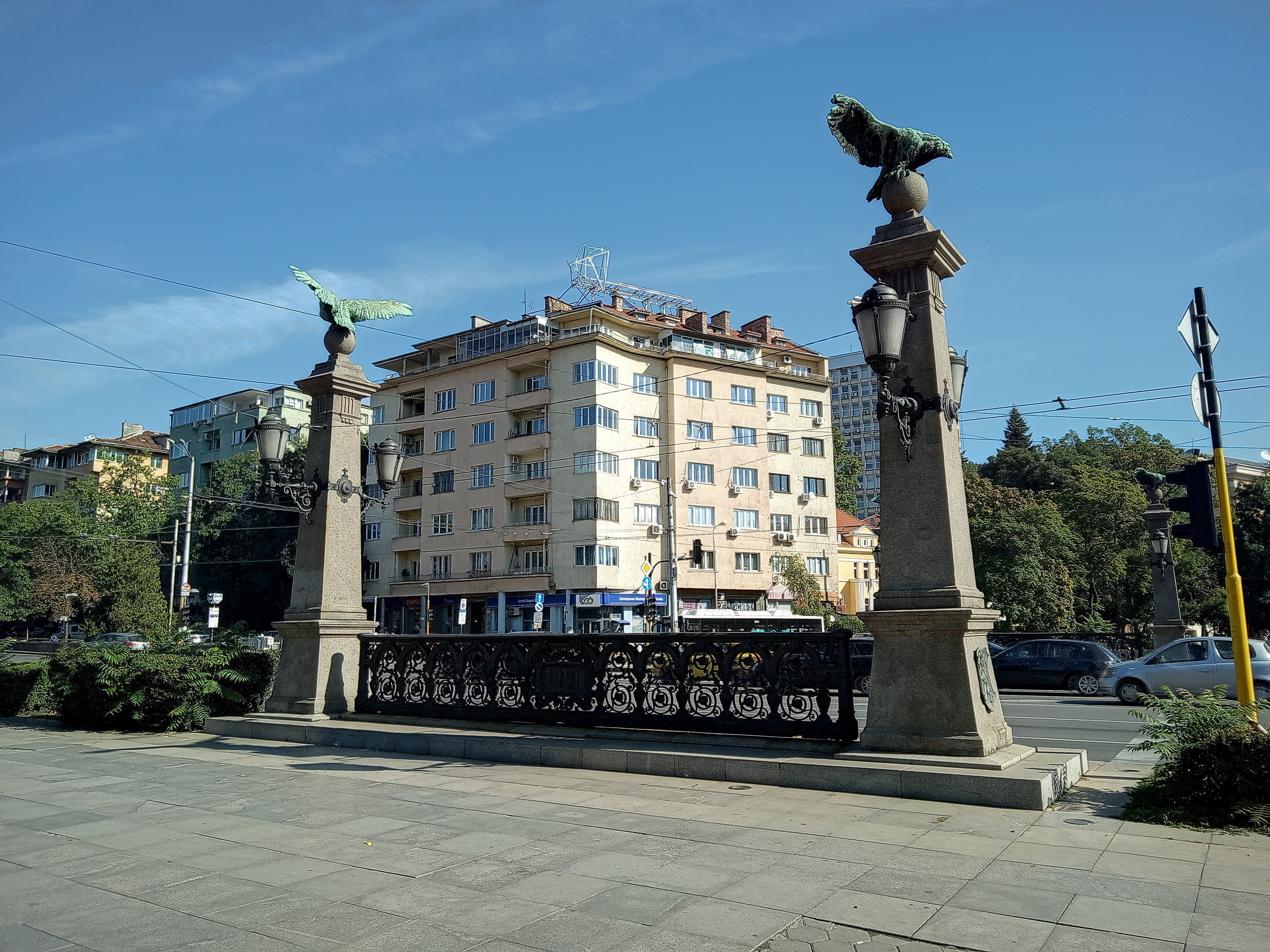
Eagles' Bridge

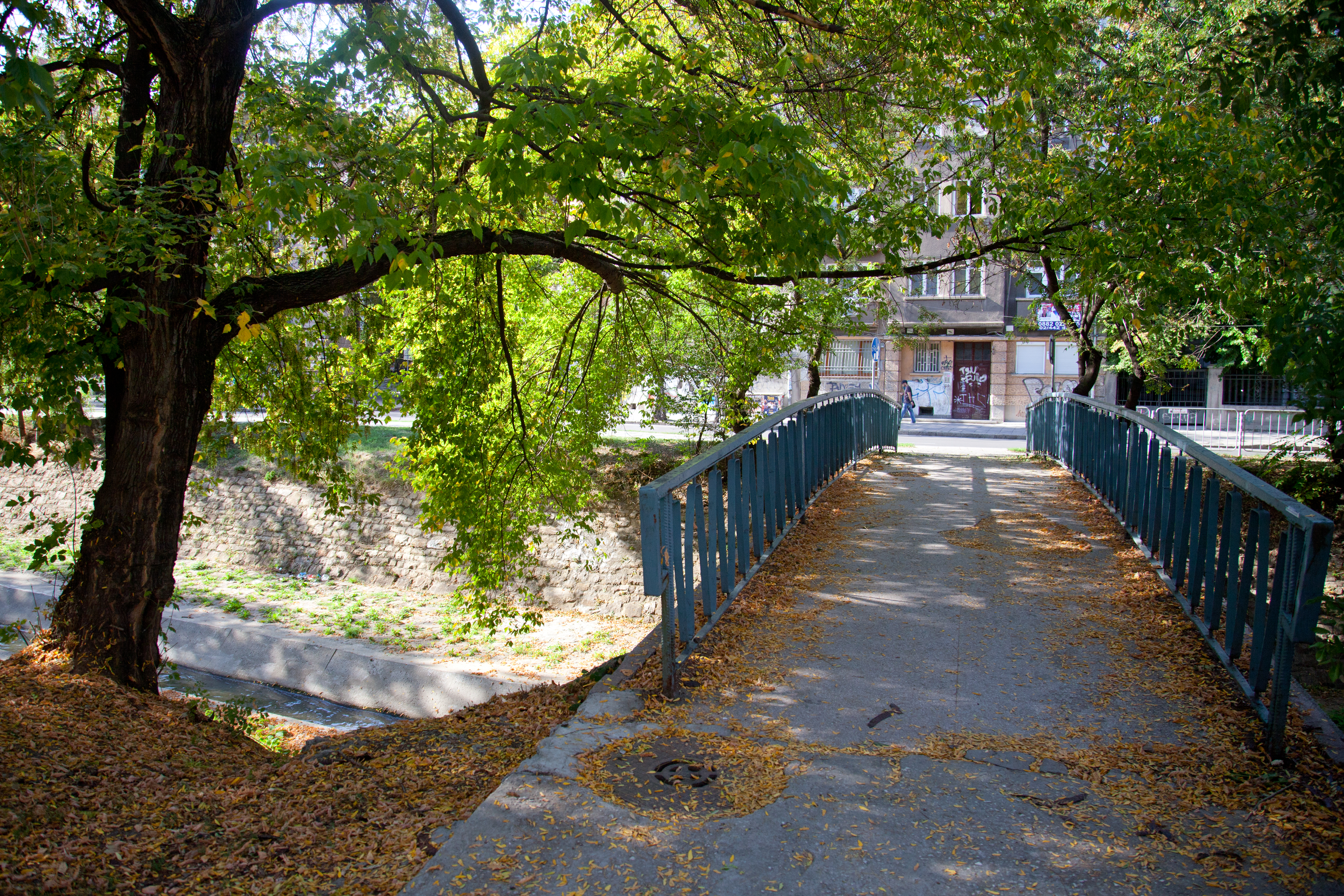
A footbridge

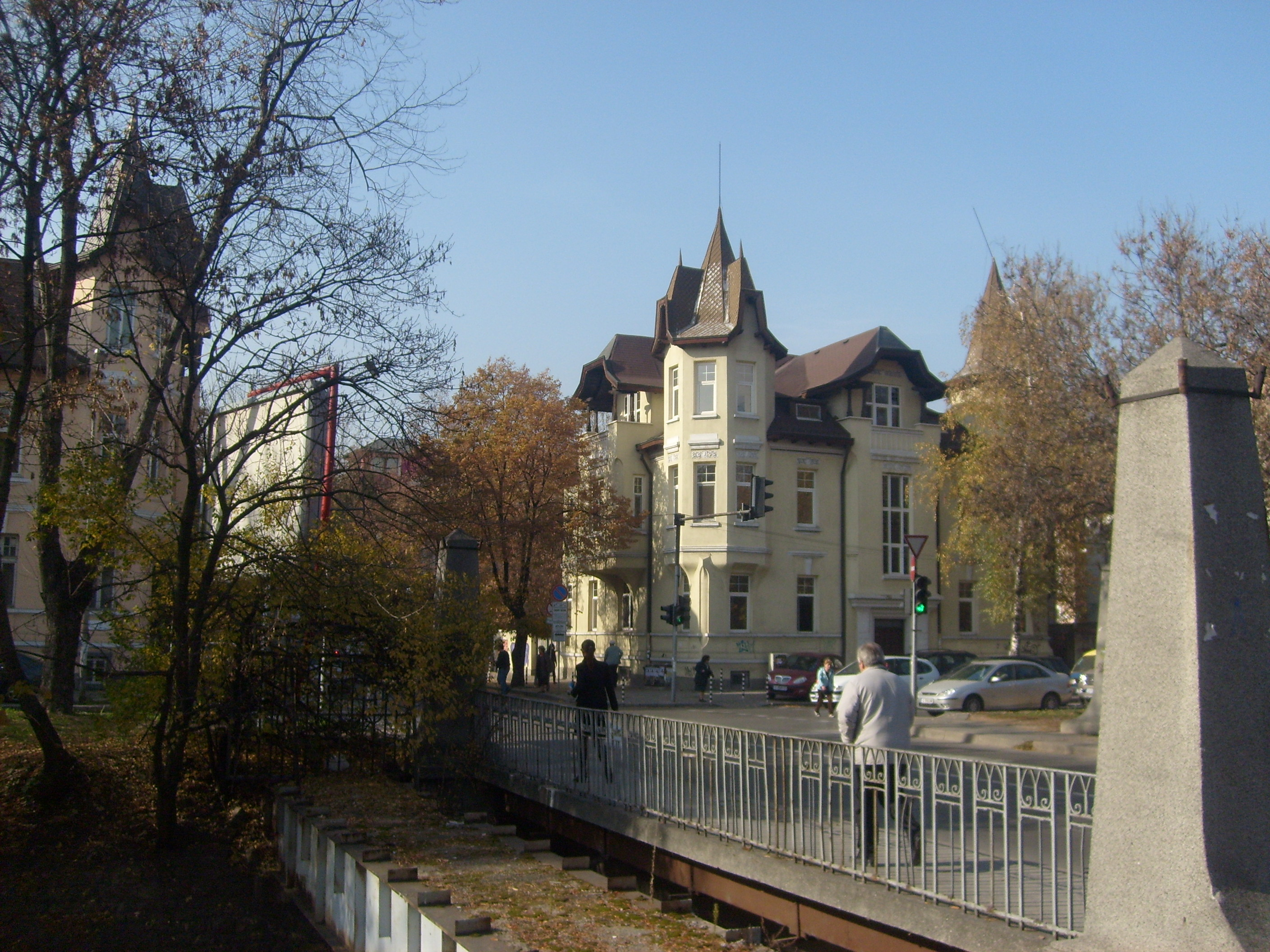
Buildings next to the river
