= Graf Ignatiev Street =

Street in Sofia, Bulgaria

- ул. „Граф Игнатиев“ (Bulgarian)
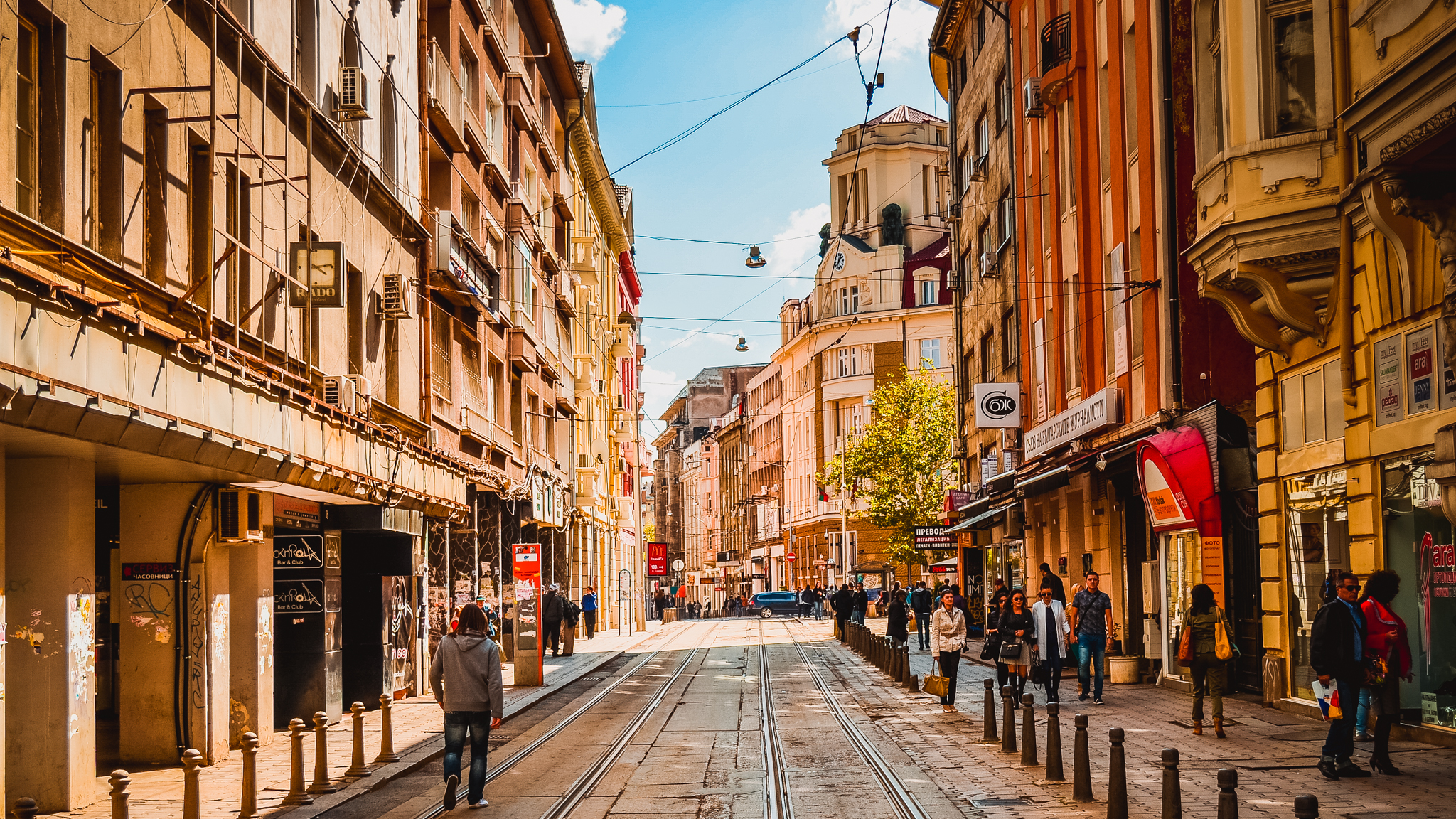

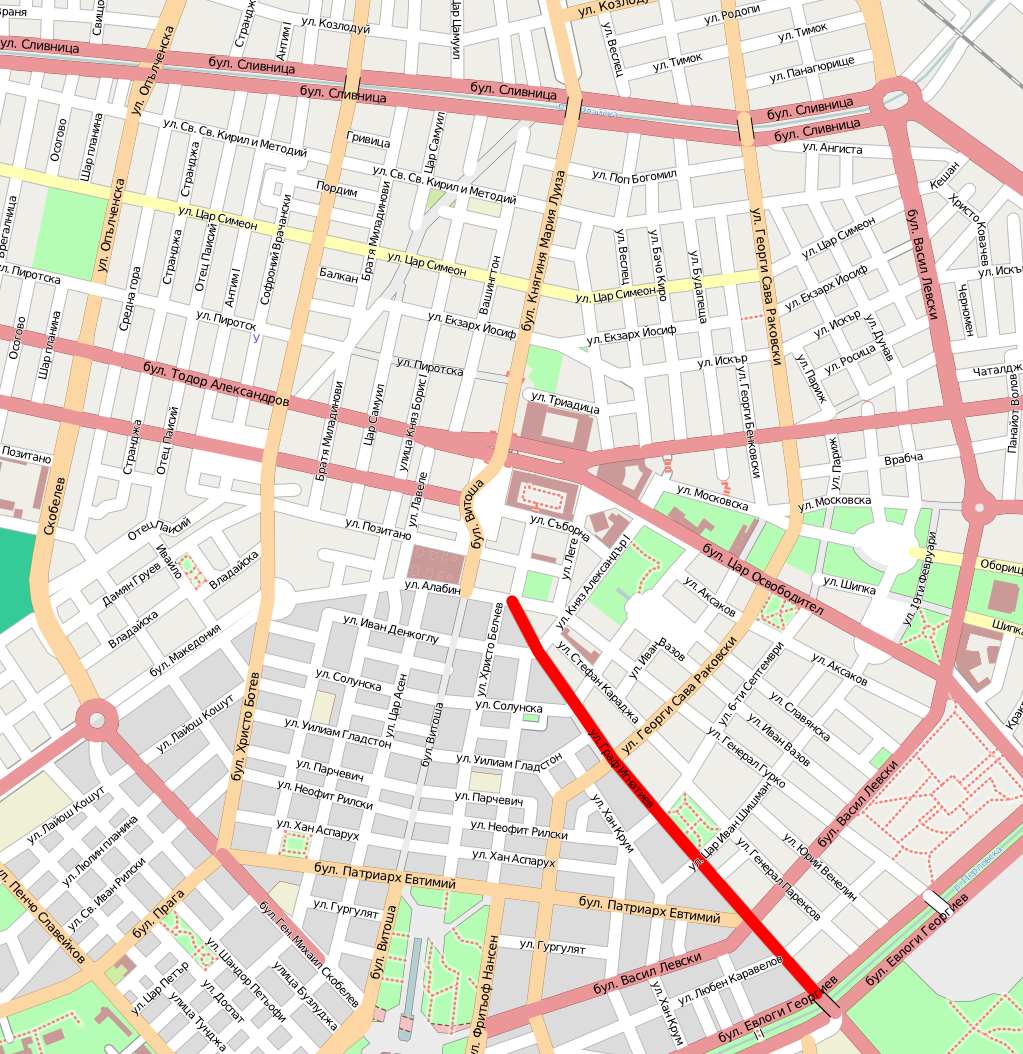
- Location within Sofia City center
- Type: pedestrian street
- Length: 1.55 kilometres (0.96 mi)
- Location: Sofia
- Coordinates: 42°41′30″N 23°19′29″E
- West end: Alabin Street
- Major junctions: Vasil Levski Boulevard, Georgi Rakovski Street
- East end: Evlogi Georgiev Boulevard

Graf Ignatiev Street (Bulgarian: улица „Граф Игнатиев“), colloquially called Graf's Street (улица Графа, ulitsa Grafa "Count's Street") or simply Grafa is the central street in the Bulgarian capital Sofia.

It was named after the Russian statesman and diplomat Count Nicholay Pavlovich Ignatiev. The street lies in the city centre between Evlogi Georgiev Boulevard, after which it is called Dragan Tsankov Boulevard, to the east and Alabin Street near the Vitosha Boulevard to the west. It is crossed by major roads such as Vasil Levski Boulevard and Georgi Rakovski Street. Several of the landmarks of Sofia are located along the street such as the Patriarch Evtimiy Square, Sveti Sedmochislenitsi Church, Slaveykov Square and Garibaldi Square. Several tram lines are running along the street. On 26 April 2007 the Council of the Capital Municipality decided to make Graf Ignatiev a pedestrian street.

The street underwent an overhaul in 2018–2019.

== Gallery ==
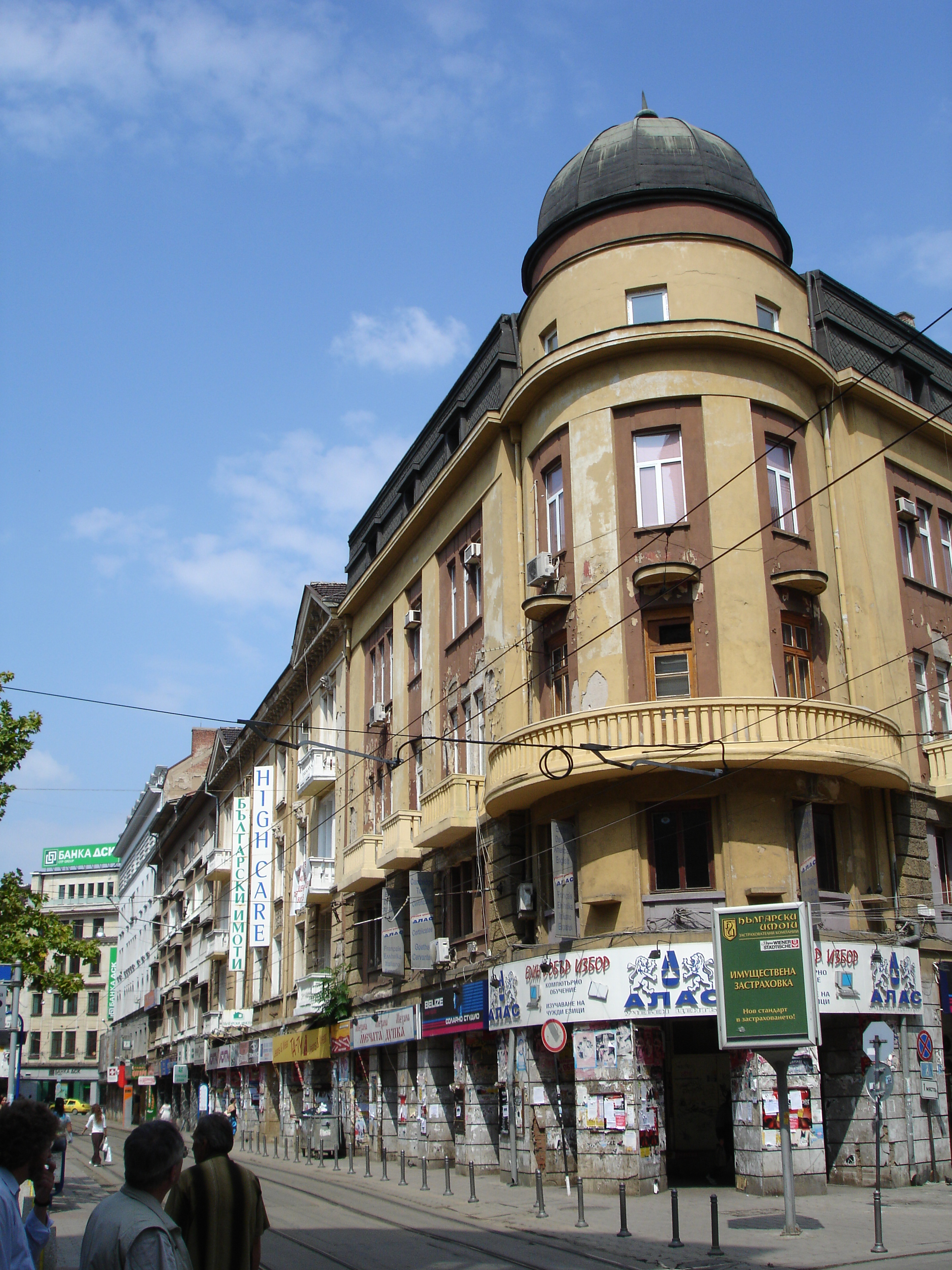

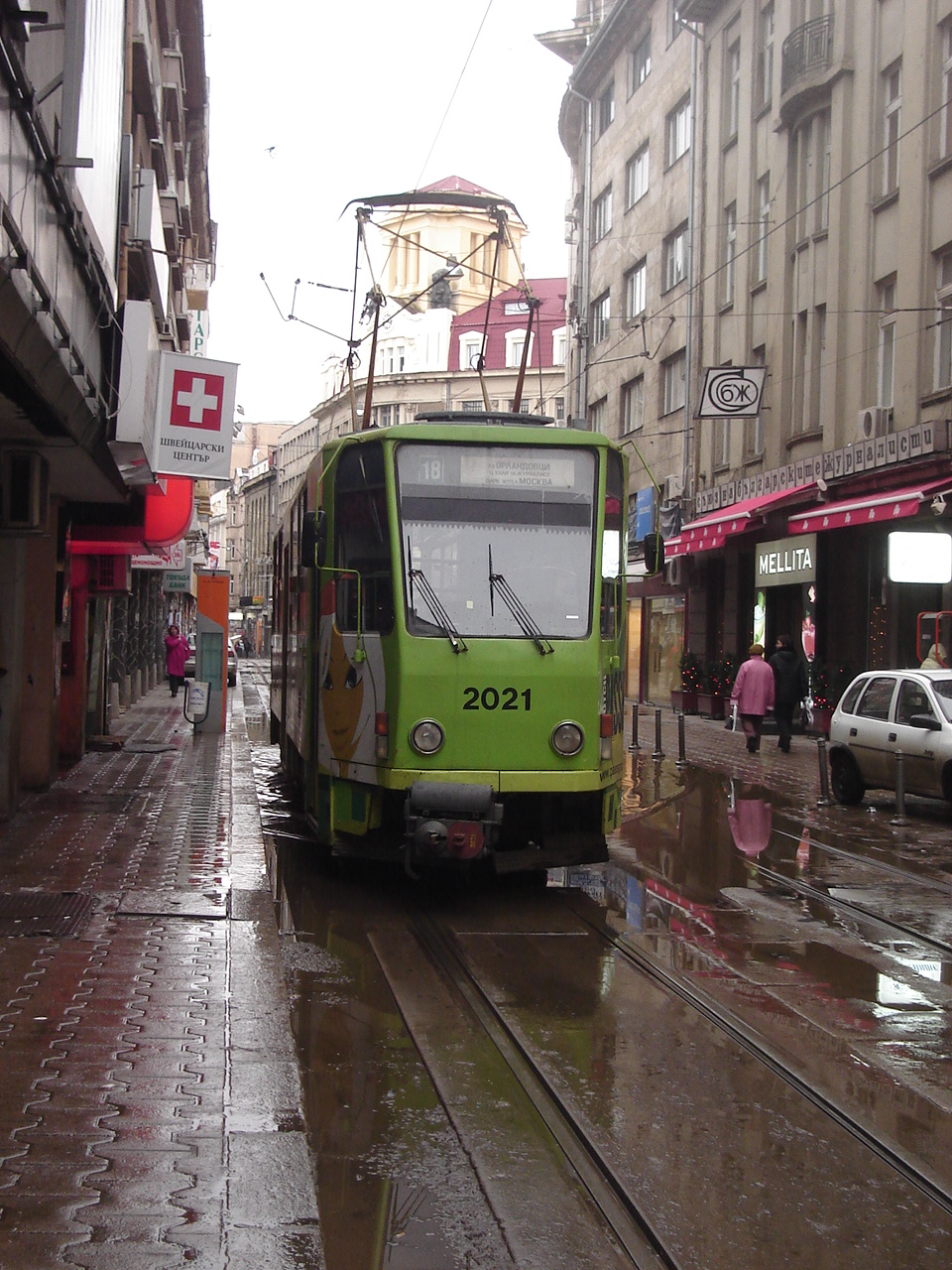

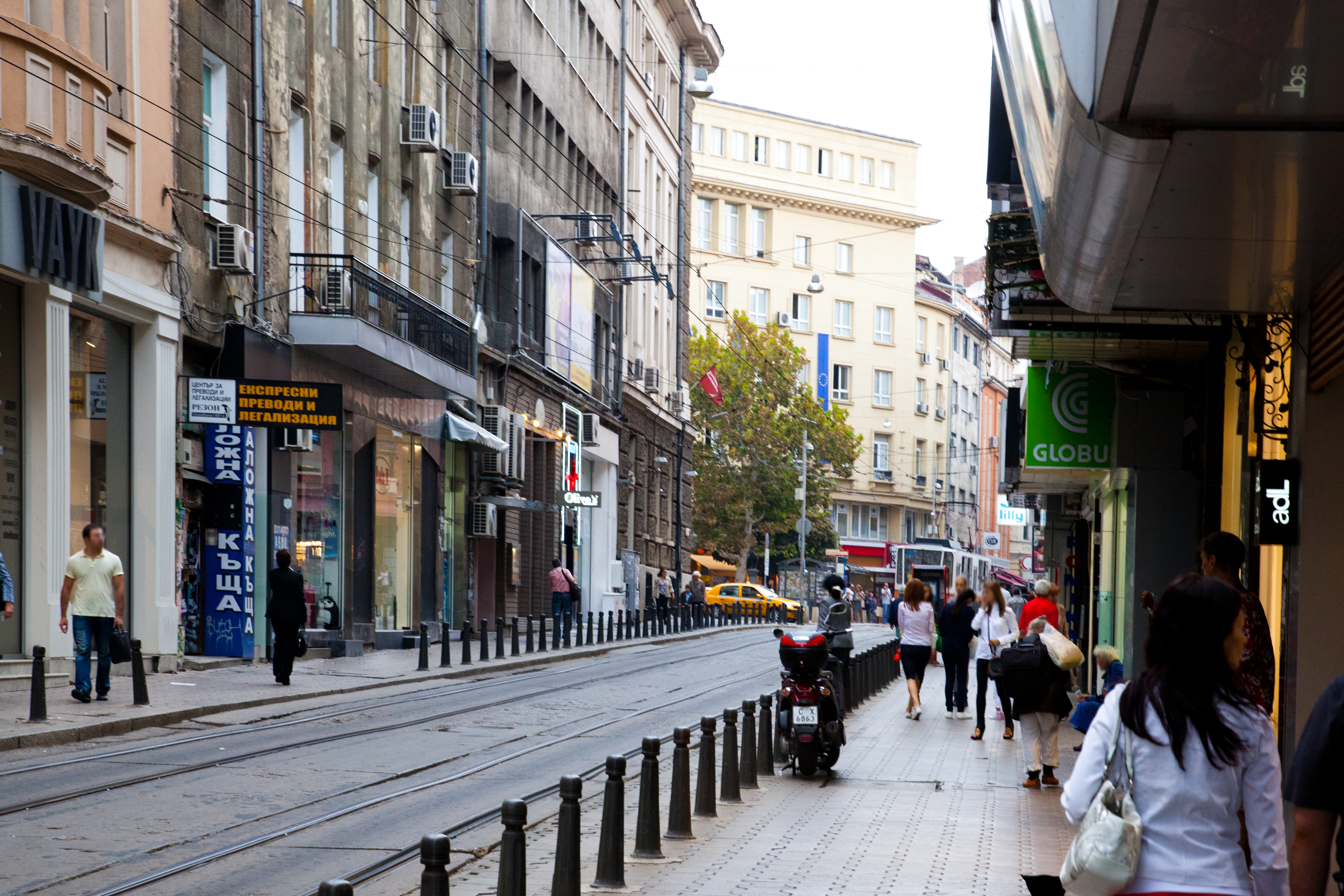
