= List of BDŽ locomotives =

This is a list of the Locomotives of the Bulgarian State Railways (BDŽ).

== Steam locomotives ==
=== Express locomotives ===
Number(s)	Type	Number(s)	Type	UIC class	Quantity	Manufacturer	Year(s)	Notes
from 1908		from 1936		UIC class	Quantity	Manufacturer	Year(s)	Notes
1–8	S 3/5 c	08.01–06	Б 2-3-0_{14}	2′C n4v	8	J. A. Maffei	1897–1904	Prototype for Bavarian C V
9–20	S 3/5 c	08.07–17	Б 2-3-0_{14}	2′C n4v	12	J. A. Maffei	1905–1908	As Bavarian P 3/5 N
21	S 3/6 v	09.01	Б 2-3-1_{16}	2′C1′ h4	1	Cockerill	1912	First superheated locomotive of the BDŽ; rebuilt in 1933
8.002–8.014	S 4/6 z	01.01–23	Б 1-4-1_{17}	1′D1′ h2	23	Hanomag (3); Chrzanóv (10); Borsig (2); Henschel & Son (2); Swiss Locomotive & Machine Works (6)	1930–1935	Bulgarian standard locomotives
		02.01–05	Б 1-4-1_{17}	1′D1′ h3	5	Henschel & Son (2); Chrzanóv (3)	1935–1938	Bulgarian standard locomotive, three-cylinder version of class 01
		03.01–12	Б 2-4-1_{17}	2′D1′ h3	12	Henschel & Son	1941–1942	Bulgarian standard locomotive
		05.01–05	Б 2-3-1_{17.5}	2′C1′ h3	5	Krupp	1941	Bulgarian standard locomotive, were numbered 07.01–05 until 1942

=== Mixed traffic locomotives ===
Numbers(s)	Type	Number(s)	Type	UIC class	Quantity	Manufacturer	Year(s)	Notes
from 1908		from 1936		UIC class	Quantity	Manufacturer	Year(s)	Notes
142–150	P 3/3 z			C n2i	9	Beyer, Peacock & Company (1); Sharp, Stewart & Company (8)	1868–1869	ex CO 279–286 and 288; acquired in 1888 with the Ruse-Varna railway
151–157	P 3/3 z			C n2	7	StEG	1887–1890	ex 21–27 (and until 1897: 1–5 and 64–65)
101–106	P 3/4 z			1′C n2	6	StEG	1890	ex 14–19 (and until 1905: 6–11); as PO class 85
171–178	P 3/3 c	16.01–??	П 0-3-0_{14}	C n2v	8	Vulcan (Stettin)	1896–1897	ex. 28–35; Similar to Prussian G 4.2
801–874	P 4/5 c	17.01–73	П 1-4-0_{14}	1′D n4v	74	Henschel & Son (62); Škoda Works (12)	1912–1925	Universal locomotives
8.001	P 4/6 c	18.01	П 1-4-1_{14}	1′D1′ h4v	(1)	Henschel & Son	(1928)	Rebuilt from 801 after accident damage
901–970	P 5/6 c	19.01–70	П 1-5-0_{14}	1′E h4v	70	Hanomag	1913–1918	Universal locomotives
9.001–9.010	P 5/6 z	10.01–16	П 1-5-0_{17}	1′E h2	16	BMAG (13); Krupp (3)	1931–1935	Bulgarian standard locomotive
		11.01–22	П 2-5-0_{17}	2′E h3	17	Henschel & Son (10); Borsig (7)	1941–1943	Bulgarian standard locomotive. Five locomotives (11.11 – 11.15) cancelled
		12.01–17	П 1-5-0_{18}	1′E h2	17	Henschel & Son (9); Krupp (3); BMAG (5)	1939–1940	Ordered by TCDD as part of class 56.0: 12.01–07 bought from the factory in 1940; 12.08–17 bought from the DR (58.2501–10) 1941
		13.01–42	П 1-5-0_{16}	1′E h3	42	MBG Karlsruhe (6); Borsig (8); Linke-Hofmann (9); Henschel & Son (9); Hanomag (6); Schichau-Werke (2); Rheinmetall (2)	1919–1921	ex Prussian G 12 (DR class 58); Soviet war booty, acquired in 1946
		14.01–50	П 1-5-0_{15}	1′E h2	50	Henschel & Son (12); Borsig (1); Krupp (5); Krauss-Maffei (8); Lokomotivfabrik Floridsdorf (3); Škoda Works (3); Arnold Jung Lokomotivfabrik (2); Maschinenfabrik Esslingen (1); BMAG (4); Orenstein & Koppel (1); Schichau-Werke (3)	1939–1942	ex DR class 50: 14.01–30 bought from the DR in 1943; 14.31–50 bought from the ČSD (555.1) in 1958
		15.01–275	П 1-5-0_{15}	1′E h2	275	(various)	1942–1944	ex DR class 52: 15.01–85 Soviet war booty, acquired in 1946; 15.86–105 bought from the DR in 1956; 15.106–125 bought from the ČSD (555.0) in 1958; 15.126–135 hired from the DR in 1959, purchased in 1961; 15.136–275 bought from the SŽD (ТЭ) in 1961–1964
		16.01–33	П 1-5-0_{17}	1′E h2	33	Lokomotivfabrik Floridsdorf	1947–1949	DR class 42; purchased in 1952

=== Goods locomotives ===
Number(s)	Type	Numbers(s)	Type	UIC class	Quantity	Manufacturer	Year(s)	Notes
from 1908		from 1936		UIC class	Quantity	Manufacturer	Year(s)	Notes
243–246	G 4/4 z			D n2	4	StEG	1878	Ex CO 243–246, né StEG 1243–1246; StEG V class; acquired in 1888 with Ruse-Varna railway
201–207	G 4/4 z			D n2	7	StEG	1887	Ex 51–57; as Südbahn 35d
208–213	G 4/4 z	25.01	Т 0-4-0_{14}	D n2	6	Hanomag	1891	Ex 58–63
251–254	G 4/4 c	25.02	Т 0-4-0_{14}	D n2v	4	Vulcan (Stettin)	1896–1899	Ex 64–67; similar to Prussian G 7^{2}
250	G 4/5 c	29.01	Т 1-2+2-0_{14}	(1′B)B n4v	1	J. A. Maffei	1900	Ex 68; Mallet locomotive; exhibited at the 1900 World's Fair, purchased in 1901
320–372	G 4/4 c	26.01–38	Т 0-4-0_{14}	D n2v	53	Hanomag (16); J. A. Maffei (6); Wiener Neustädter (10); Henschel & Son (21)	1901–1909	Ex 71–94 (old numbering); initially referred to briefly as K series
255–259	G 4/4 c	25.03–04	Т 0-4-0_{14}	D n2v	5	Hanomag	1905	Ex 42–46; similar to Prussian G 7^{2}
501–587	G 5/5 c	28.01–83	Т 0-5-0_{14}	E n2v	87	J. A. Maffei (7); Hohenzollern (7); Hanomag (61); Škoda Works (12)	1909–1925	c. 60 rebuilt as simple expansion and with superheaters (1939–1960)
701–718	G 4/5 c	27.01–17	Т 1-4-0_{14}	1′D n4v	18	Hanomag	1910	Some rebuilt with superheaters from 1934
		20.01–08	Т 1-4-1_{15.5}	1′D1′ h2	8	Škoda Works	1939	Ordered by Manchuria but not delivered, acquired 1942

=== Tank locomotives ===
Number(s)	Type	Numbers(s)	Type	UIC class	Quantity	Manufacturer	Year(s)	Notes
from 1908		from 1936		UIC class	Quantity	Manufacturer	Year(s)	Notes
1920	T 3/4 z			C1′ n2t	1		1868	Ex 314; Acquired in 1888 with the Ruse-Varna railway
1921–1922	T 3/3 z			C n2t	2		1870–1873	Ex MÁV 6601 and 6605; MÁV XIIe class (né StEG II 601–605), date of acquisition unknown
1918–1919	T 2/2 z			B n2t	2	Hanomag	1887–1889	Ex 1918 (builder's number) und 1 TL; construction locomotives
1002–1004	T 3/3 z	47.01–03	Тт 0-3-0_{14}	C n2t	3	J. A. Maffei	1897–1898	Ex 102–104; similar to Palatine T 3
1005–1009	T 3/3 z	47.04–08	Тт 0-3-0_{14}	C n2t	5	J. A. Maffei	1900	Ex 105–109; as Bavarian D II^{II}, Diverted from an order from the Royal Bavarian State Railways
1010–1020	T 3/3 z	47.09−18	Тт 0-3-0_{14}	C n2t	11	Henschel & Son; J. A. Maffei	1909	Modified Bavarian D II^{II}
2001–2045	T 3/5 z	35.01–45	Пт 1-3-1_{14} or П_{Т} 1-3-1_{15}	1′C1′ n2t	45	Hanomag (20); BMAG (25)	1910–1921	
3001–3025	T 5/5 c	49.01–24	Тт 0-5-0_{14.6} or Т_{Т} 0-5-0_{15.3}	E n2vt	25	Hanomag (15); BMAG (10)	1917	
4001–4010	T 6/6 c	45.01–10	Тт 0-6-0_{17}	F n2vt	10	Hanomag	1922	All rebuilt as simple expansion with superheaters after World War II
1021–1040	T 3/3 z	47.19−38	Тт 0-3-0_{15}	C n2t	20	Škoda Works	1925	Modernised version of 1000 series
1401–1403	T 4/5 z	48.01–06	Тт 0-4-1_{15}	D1′ n2t	6	Hanomag (3); BDŽ Sofia (3)	1930–1949	1401–1403 built for the Pernik coal mine, acquired in 1931; 48.04–48.06 only steam locomotives built in Bulgaria
3501–3508	T 5/5 z	50.01–10	Тт 0-5-0_{15}	E h2t	10		1907–1913	ex Prussian T 16; left behind in Bulgaria after World War I; Purchased in 1931 and returned to service
4.501–4.512	T 6/9 z	46.01–12	Тт 1-6-2_{17}	1′F2′ h2t	12	H. Cegielski	1931	Bulgarian standard locomotive
		46.13–20	Тт 1-6-2_{18}	1′F2′ h3t	8	BMAG	1943	Bulgarian standard steam locomotive, three-cylinder version of class 46
		36.01–10	Бт 1-4-2_{15.7}	1′D2′ h3t	10	Krupp	1943	Bulgarian standard steam locomotive

=== 760 mm gauge locomotives ===
Number(s)	Type	Numbers(s)	Type	UIC class	Quantity	Manufacturer	Year(s)	Notes
from 1908		from 1936		UIC class	Quantity	Manufacturer	Year(s)	Notes
1^{76}–10^{76}	T 3/4 c	1^{76}–10^{76}	Пт 0-3-1_{9}	C1′ n2vt	10	Rheinmetall	1922	
400^{76}	T 4/4 z	400^{76}	Тт 0-4-0_{5}	D n2t	1	Henschel & Son	1920	
501^{76}–504^{76}	T 5/5 z	501^{76}–504^{76}	Тт 0-5-0_{10}	E h2t	4	ČKD	1927	
505^{76}–506^{76}	T 5/5 z	505^{76}–506^{76}	Тт 0-5-0_{9}	E h2t	2	BMAG	1931	
		601^{76}–620^{76}	Тт 1-5-1_{10}	1′E1′ h2t	20	BMAG (10); Chrzanów (10)	1940–1949	Similar to DR class 99^{73–76}

=== 600 mm gauge locomotives ===
Number(s)	Type	Numbers(s)	Type	UIC class	Quantity	Manufacturer	Year(s)	Notes
from 1908		from 1936		UIC class	Quantity	Manufacturer	Year(s)	Notes
201^{60}–??		201^{60}–??	Т_{Т} 0-2-0_{3}	B n2t	min. 3		from 1906	ex Deutsche Heeresfeldbahn; Acquired after the end or World War I
301^{60}–??		301^{60}–??	Т_{Т} 0-3-0_{3}	C n2t	min. 9		from 1900	ex Deutsche Heeresfeldbahn; Acquired after the end or World War I
401^{60}–493^{60}		401^{60}–493^{60}	Т_{Т} 0-4-0_{3}	D n2t	93		1914–1925	ex Deutsche Heeresfeldbahn; Acquired after the end or World War I
		01.01^{60}–04^{60}	П_{Т} 2-3-0_{4}	2'C n2t	4	Baldwin	1917	Acquired in 1942 with the line to Rila Monastery

== Diesel locomotives ==
Class	Type	Quantity	Manufacturer	Year(s)	Power (kW)	Power (hp)	Notes	
04	B′B′ dh	50	Simmering-Graz-Pauker	1963	2 × 809	0 × 1,080	ÖBB prototyp diesel class 2020.01	
06	Co′Co′ de	130	Electroputere		1,566	2,100	Similar to Căile Ferate Române class 62	
07	Co′Co′ de	90 + 2 from CSD	Luhanskteplovoz	1971	2,200	2,950	USSR locomotive class ТЭ 109	Identical to Deutsche Reichsbahn class 131
51	diesel		Ganz				Identical to ŽS class 641 and MÁV M44	
52	D dh		LEW				Identical to Deutsche Reichsbahn class V 60	
55	dh		FAUR				Most common locomotive in the BDŽ fleet.	
66	B dh		Humboldt-Deutzmotoren A.G.				Former WR 200 B 14 of the German army (DB and DR Class V 20)	

=== 760 mm gauge locomotives ===
Class	Type	Quantity	Manufacturer	Year(s)	Power (kW)	Power (hp)	Notes
75	B′B′ dh	10	Henschel & Son	1965	820	1100	Three still in service
76	B'B' dh	15	FAUR	1976-1978	820	1100	All retired
77	B′B′ dh	10	FAUR	1988	820	1100	One still in service
81	B′B′ dh	10	Kambarka Engineering Works	1982	294	390	Soviet class ТУ7 (TU7) shunting locomotive

Surviving locomotives are only used on the Septemvri-Dobrinishte narrow gauge line, Bulgaria's only remaining narrow gauge railway.

== Electric locomotives ==
Class	Type	Quantity	Manufacturer	Year(s)	Power (kW)	Power (hp)	Notes
41	Bo'-Bo'	41	Škoda Works	1962–1963	3000		
42.1	Bo'-Bo'	90	Škoda Works	1966–1970	3020		
43	Bo'-Bo'	56	Škoda Works	1971–1974	3040		
44	Bo'-Bo'	89	Škoda Works	1975–1980	3140		As class 43, but with electro-dynamic brake
45	Bo'-Bo'	60	Škoda Works	1982–1983	3140		As class 44, but with different gear ratio for working 110-kilometre-per-hour (68 mph) freight trains
46, 46.2	Co'-Co'	45	Electroputere	1986–1987	5,100	6,840	Model LE5100. Identical to Căile Ferate Române class 40.
60	B'-B'	4	Škoda Works	1982–1985	800		
61	Bo'-Bo'	20	Škoda Works	1994	960		Used for shunting and light works trains.
80	Bo'-Bo'	25	Siemens	2020–2025	5600	7509	Smartron is a lower powered version with a fixed configuration of Siemens Vectron. Can reach speeds of up to 160 km/h.

=== EMUs ===
Class	Manufacturer	Quantity	Year(s)	Type	Notes	Photo
30	Siemens	15	2007	Bo’2’2’Bo’	3-carriages-EMU of type Desiro Classic	
31	Siemens	10	2008	Bo’2’2’2’Bo’	4-carriages-EMU of type Desiro Classic	
32	RVR Riga	79	1969–1979	Bo’Bo’+2’2’+2’2’+Bo’Bo’	4-carriages-EMU of Sowjet type ЭР25	
33	RVR Riga	6	1988–1991	Bo’Bo’+2’2’+2’2’+Bo’Bo’	improved edition of class 32	
34	Škoda Vagonka	25	2026	Bo’2’+Bo’2’+2’Bo’+2’Bo’	4-carriages-EMU of type RegioPanter	
35	Alstom	35	2025–		6-carriages-EMU of Coradia Stream	
