= List of FAUR locomotives =

The following is a list of diesel locomotives produced by FAUR, Romania, that include diesel–electric, diesel hydraulic, and diesel–mechanical locomotives.

== For Romanian Railways ==
Romanian Railways CFR's diesel locomotives built by FAUR Bucharest are classes 64 to 95.

=== Diesel–electric ===
Image	Class	Former designation	Type	Years built	Power (kW)	Power (hp)	Max speed (km/h)	Max speed (mph)	Notes
	69	040–DF	Bo′Bo′ de	1975–1977	930	1,250	100	62	Engine type „Sulzer 6‐LDSR‐28‐B”, electrogenerator type „GP‐990/12”, 4 electromotor type GDTM‐553‐F. 18 are currently in operation.
	73		Bo′Bo′ de	1975–1977	930	1,250	100	62	Same as class 69 but with two air compressors. 10 are currently in operation.
	64	060-DG	Co′Co′ de	1975–1977	1,115	1,500	100	62	Nicknamed "Mula", all of them retired from service.

=== Diesel-hydraulic ===
Image	Class	Former designation	Type	Years built	Power (kW)	Power (hp)	Max speed (km/h)	Max speed (mph)	Notes
	80	040–DHC	B′B′ dh	1966–1985	930	1,250	100	62	Uses steam heating.
	81		B′B′ dh	1966–1985	930	1,250	100	62	Same as class 80, but has no train heating.
	82		B′B′ dh	1999–Present	1,104	1,480	100	62	Based on class 80/81 overhauled by Alstom with new control systems, rebuilt body, Electrical Train Heating and Caterpillar engine. 20 or more are currently in operation.
	83		B′B′ dh	1998	1,104	1,480	100	62	Same as class 82 but uses MTU engine. 2 are currently in use.
	84		B′B′ dh	1998	920	1,230	100	62	Same as class 80 but is used on broad-gauge railways.
	85	LDH–70	B′B′ dh	1965-1983	520	700	70	43	Straight-12 engine type Maybach-MB-820-Bb.
	86	LDH–45	B′B′ dh	1965-1983	335	450	60	37	Straight-six engine type Maybach-MB-836-b or Mb-820-Bb.
	87	L45H	B′B′ dh	1979–1984	335	450	40	25	Used for 760 mm narrow gauge services. 4 are currently in operation (though 5 other locomotives are used by private operators).

=== Diesel–mechanical ===
Image	Class	Type	Years built	Power (kW)	Power (hp)	Max speed (km/h)	Max speed (mph)	Notes
	88	B dm shunter	1981–1984	184	250	40	25	81 were built originally, though a significant amount have been replaced by newer types.
	95	B dm shunter	1935–1950	88	118	55	34	8 are currently in use (3 of which are used by SFT).

== For Bulgarian State Railways ==
- BDŽ class 55
- BDŽ class 76
- BDŽ class 77

== For Czechoslovak State Railways ==
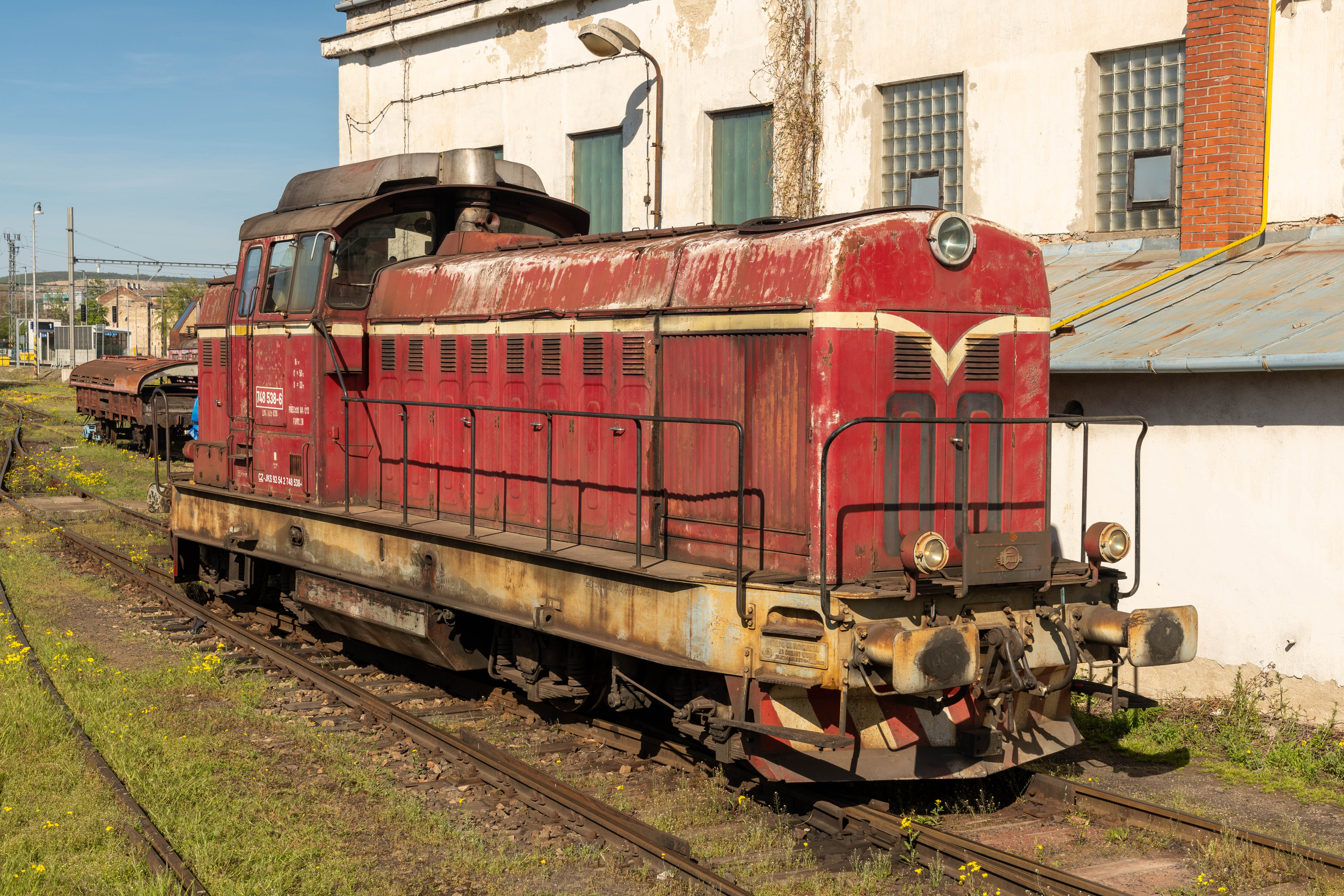
FAUR LDH 125 of czech class 748.5 in Brno

- ČD Class 706.42
- ČD Class 748.45
- ČD Class 748.47
- ČD Class 748.5

== For Deutsche Reichsbahn ==
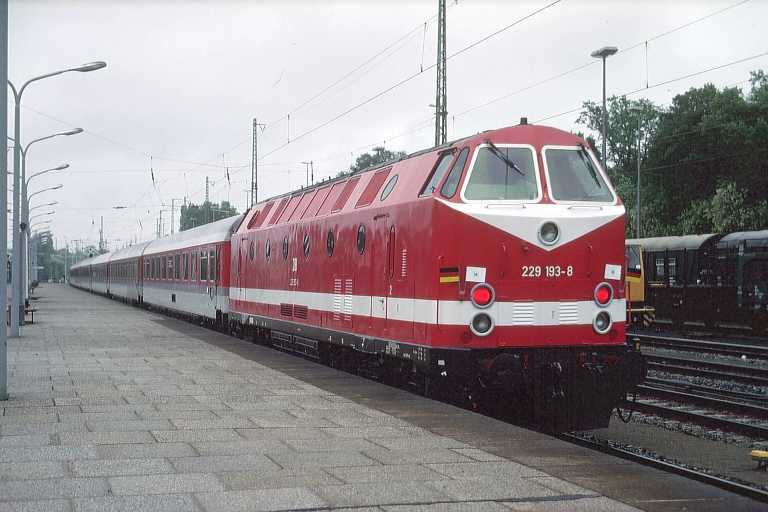
DR 119 (219) Class diesel-hydraulic locomotive produced for Deutsche Reichsbahn

- DR Class 119 (219) Class

== For Hungarian State Railways ==
- MÁV M43 Class (wiki article in German and in Hungarian)
- MÁV M47 Class (wiki article in German and in Hungarian)
- MÁV Mk45 Class (wiki article in Hungarian)

== For Polish State Railways ==
- MBxd2 Class

== Demonstrator for United States ==
- LDH125 "Quarterhorse" (diesel-hydraulic 1974-1980s)

== See also ==
- List of stock used by Romanian Railways
- List of Electroputere locomotives
