= Rolling stock of the Romanian Railways =

This is a list of rolling stock of various railway operators in Romania.

== Electric locomotives ==
Designation	Producer	Power output (kW)	UIC wheel arrangement	Top speed	Building years	Notes	Image
Class 40 (060–EA)	Electroputere	5100 kW (6600 kW)	Co'Co'	120 km/h (160 km/h)	1965–1991	Used for passenger and freight services.	
Class 41 (060–EA–1)	Electroputere	5100 kW	Co'Co'	160 km/h	1966–1991	Same as class 40, but with higher top speed and small improvements.	
Class 42	Electroputere	5100 kW	Co'Co'	200 km/h	1977	2 ever built, for speed tests: EA2 122 and EA2 302.	
Class 43 (040–EC)	Končar	3400 kW	Bo'Bo'	120 km/h	1973–1984		
Class 44 (040–EC1)	Končar	3400 kW	Bo’Bo’	160 km/h	1973–1984	Same as class 43, but with higher top speed and small improvements.	
Class 45	Electroputere - Siemens	5100 kW	Co'Co'	160 km/h	1999-2000	Heavily modernised class 41 locomotives, with new bogies, gears, control systems and brakes. First CFR locomotives to use computerised traction control. 24 units currently in service, 20 are converted from class 41.	
Class 46	Končar and Softronic	3840 kW	Bo'Bo'	160 km/h	1999-2001	Heavily modernised class 43/44 locomotives.	
Class 47	Electroputere - Softronic	6600 kW	Co'Co'	120 km/h (160 km/h)	2006–present	Modernized from Class 40 and 41 for heavy freight loads (series 470/474). Some passenger versions also exist (series 477). They have the same aspect as class 46. They are nicknamed The Dolphin (from Romanian - Delfinul).	
Class 48 (Transmontana)	Softronic	6600 kW	Co'Co'	200 km/h	2011–present	Softronic's demontstrator unit, which was bought by CFR in 2011 .	
Class 48 (LEMA)	Softronic	6000 kW	Co'Co'	160 km/h	2024–present	Softronic's rebuild class40/41/42. Integrated system ETCS.	
Class 48 (ELASMO)	Relocsa	5100 kW	Co'Co'	160 km/h	2025–present	Relocsa's rebuild class40/41/42.	https://railcolornews.com/2025/02/19/free-passenger-revitalizing-rail-romanias-blue-revolution/ https://cs.railmarket.com/news/rolling-stock/30777-elasmo-locomotive-completes-performance-test-following-modernization-at-reloc-craiova
Class 48 (LEMA)	Softronic	4000 kW	Bo'Bo'	160 km/h	2025–present	SCRL's rebuild class40/41/42. Integrated system ETCS.	https://www.facebook.com/61576729467641/posts/122180364668890982/?rdid=OQ2WsU0UHRYUH39H#
Class 188 (Trax P200 MS3)	Alstom	6000 kW	Bo'Bo'	200 km/h	2025–present	16 units ordered in January 2024 by the Romania’s Railway Reform Authority (ARF) for CFR Călători.All delivered by the end of 2026.	

== Diesel locomotives ==
Designation	Type	Power output (kW)	AAR wheel arrangement	Top speed	Building years	Notes	Image
Class 60 (060 DA)	Diesel electric	1546 kW (1700 kW)	Co'Co'	100 km/h	1959–1981	The first Romanian diesel electric locomotive was from this class.	
Class 62 (060 DA1)	Diesel electric	1546 kW	Co'Co'	120 km/h	1966–1981	Improved version of class 60.	
Class 66 (ex Class 63)	Diesel electric	1582 kW	Co'Co'	120 km/h	2000–present	Modernised version of class 62 (includes electrical train heating and turbocharged 2 stroke, V8, Electro-Motive Diesel 8-710G diesel engine).	
Class 64 (ex Class 65)	Diesel electric	1582 kW	Co'Co'	100 km/h	2004–present	Modernised version of class 60 (includes Electrical Train Heating and turbocharged 2, V8, Electro-Motive Diesel 8-710G diesel engine).	
Class 67/68	Diesel electric	1546 kW	Co'Co'	100 km/h	1959–1988	Same as class 60, but uses broad gauge (1520 mm) for railways near the Moldavian and Ukrainian borders.	
Class 69 (040–DF)	Diesel electric	920 kW	Bo'Bo'	100 km/h	1975–1977	10 units used by CFR, 17 others used by different operators.	
Class 73	Diesel electric	920 kW	Bo'Bo'	100 km/h	1975–1977	Same as class 69 but with two air compressors. 10 currently in use on the Oravita - Anina line, given their smaller turning radius.	
Class 80	Diesel hydraulic	920 kW	B'B'	100 km/h	1966–1985	Uses steam to provide train heating. Mainly used as shunter in railway stations.	
Class 81 (LDH1250)	Diesel hydraulic	920 kW	B'B'	100 km/h	1966–1985	Same as class 80, but with no train heating.	
Class 82	Diesel hydraulic	1104 kW	B'B'	100 km/h	1999–present	Based on classes 80/81, modernized by Alstom and equipped with Caterpillar engine. 20 currently in use with other being modernized.	
Class 83	Diesel hydraulic	1104 kW	B'B'	100 km/h	1998	Same as class 80, but with MTU.2 engine.	
Class 84 (old)	Diesel hydraulic	920 kW	B'B'	100 km/h	1998	Used on broad railways.	
Class 84 (Subclass 841)	Diesel hydraulic	1000 kW	B'B'	100 km/h	2009–present	Classes 80/81 modernized by Remarul (Carpathia 1300 DH-M) for freight services. Classified as class 84, although old version class 84 locomotives still exist.	
Class 85	Diesel hydraulic		B'B'	40 km/h	1979–1984	Used for narrow gauge services.	
Class 86	Diesel hydraulic	331 kW	B'B'	70 km/h	1979–1985		
Class 87 (L45H)	Diesel hydraulic	330 kW	B'B'	40 km/h	1979–1984		
Class 88	Diesel mechanical shunter	184 kW	B	40 km/h	1981–1984		
Class 89	Diesel hydraulic	920 kW	B'B'	100 km/h	2005–present		
Class 95	Diesel mechanical shunter	88 kW	B	55 km/h	1935–1950		

== Electric multiple units (EMU) ==
Designation	Producer	Power output (kW)	Maximum speed	Building years	Notes	Image
Class 55/56/57 (080-TEA)	Electroputere, IVA Arad	1870 kW	120 km/h	1974, 1984–1986		
Class 58 (Z 6100)	Alstom	690 kW	120 km/h	1965–1975		
Class 101 (Coradia Stream)	Alstom	3000 kW	160 km/h	2024–present	Used for InterRegio services.	
Class 102/103 (Elf.eu)	Pesa	1600 kW	160 km/h	2025–present	Class 102 allocated to InterRegio services and Class 103 for Regio services.	
Class 104(Mireo H)	Siemens	1700 kw	160 km/h	2028	Regional and medium distance services	

== Diesel multiple units (DMU) ==
Designation	Producer	Power output (kW)	Top speed	Building years	Notes	Image
Class 76	MAN	331 kW (VT624)	120 km/h	1964–1968		
Class 76	MAN	754 kW (614)	120 km/h	1972–1975	Refurbished at Remarul 16 Februarie.	
Class 77	Malaxa	88 kW	70 km/h	1935–1942		
Class 78	Malaxa	162 kW (324 kW)	80 km/h (100 km/h)	1939–1954	This type has been produced in two different versions, a 1, 162 kW unit and a 2, 324 kW unit capable of speeds up to 100 km/h.	
Class 79	Waggon- und Maschinenbau Görlitz	132 kW	90 km/h	1960–1977	Rebuilt at MARUB Brașov.	
Class 91/92	Duewag, Waggon Union, AEG	485 kW	120 km/h	1986–1996	Former Class 98, bought from DB.	
Class 96	Siemens Mobility	550 kW	120 km/h	2003–2007	Nicknamed "Săgeata Albastră" (The Blue Arrow).	

== See also ==
- Transferoviar Călători#Rolling stock – Rolling Stock of another significant railway operator in Romania
