= BDŽ class 82 01-04 =

Class of Bulgarian diesel–mechanical railcars

BDŽ class 05 04–07 BDŽ class 82
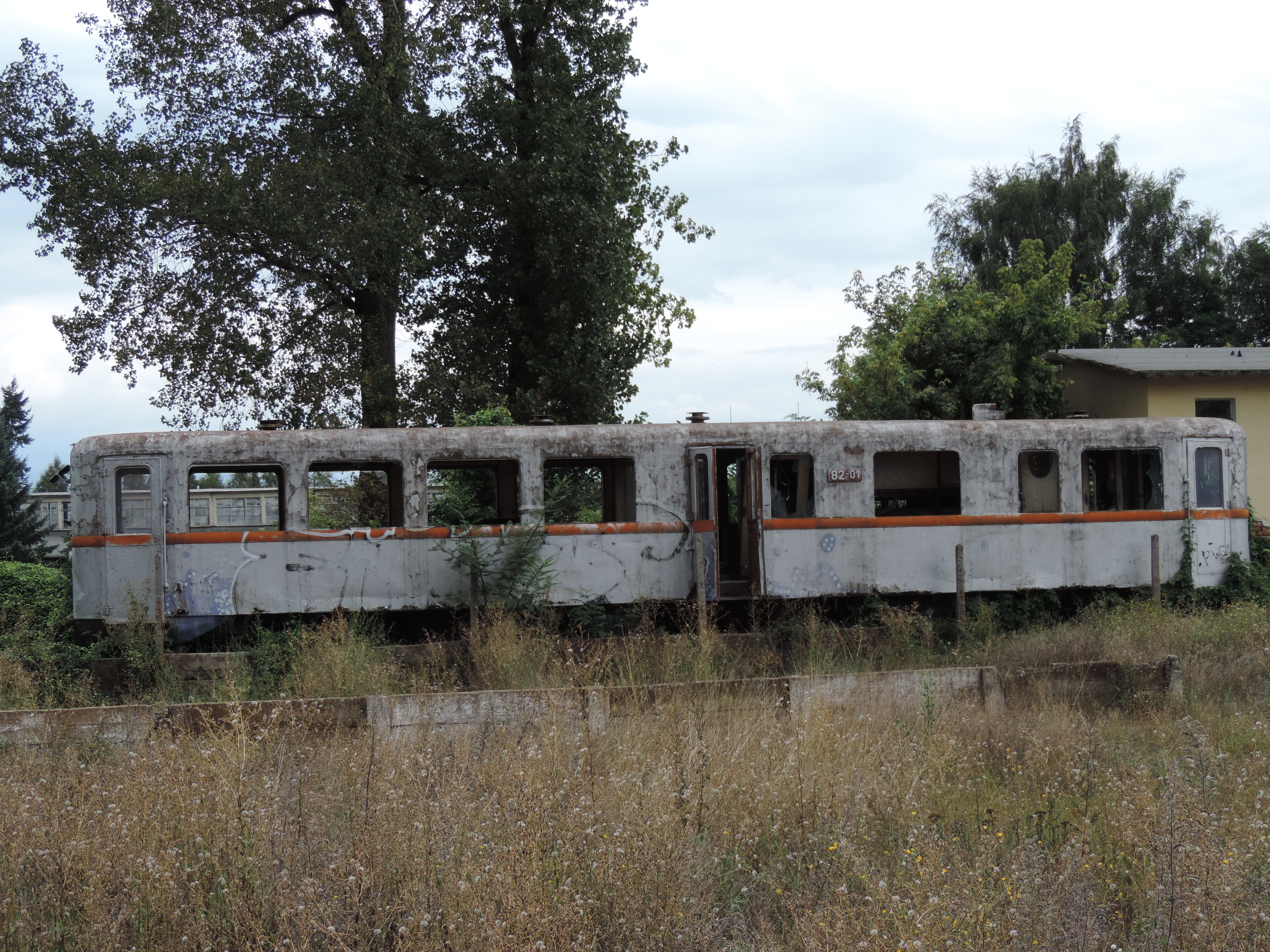
- Diesel railcar "Ganz" 82.01, Bansko, Bulgaria, 2014
- In service: 1952–1977
- Manufacturers: Ganz Works, Budapest
- Constructed: 1952
- Number built: 4
- Fleet numbers: BDŽ 05 01–03; BDŽ 82 01–04

Specifications
- Car length: 17,000 mm (55 ft 9 1/4 in)
- Wheel diameter: 720 mm (2 ft 4 3/8 in)
- Wheelbase: 13,600 mm (44 ft 7 1/2 in)
- Maximum speed: 50 km/h (31 mph)
- Weight: Empty: 28.3 t (27.9 long tons; 31.2 short tons); Service: 32.6 t (32.1 long tons; 35.9 short tons)
- Axle load: 8.4 t (8.3 long tons; 9.3 short tons)
- Prime mover: Ganz Works VIII Iat 170/240
- Engine type: Eight cylinder four-stroke Diesel engine
- Power output: 235 kW (320 PS; 315 hp)
- Tractive effort: 57 kN (12,800 lbf)
- Transmission: Diesel–mechanical
- UIC classification: B′B′
- Minimum turning radius: 60 m (196 ft 10 1/4 in)
- Braking systems: Knorr-Bremse compressed air brake hand brake
- Track gauge: 760 mm (2 ft 5 15/16 in)

BDŽ class 05 04–07 BDŽ class 82
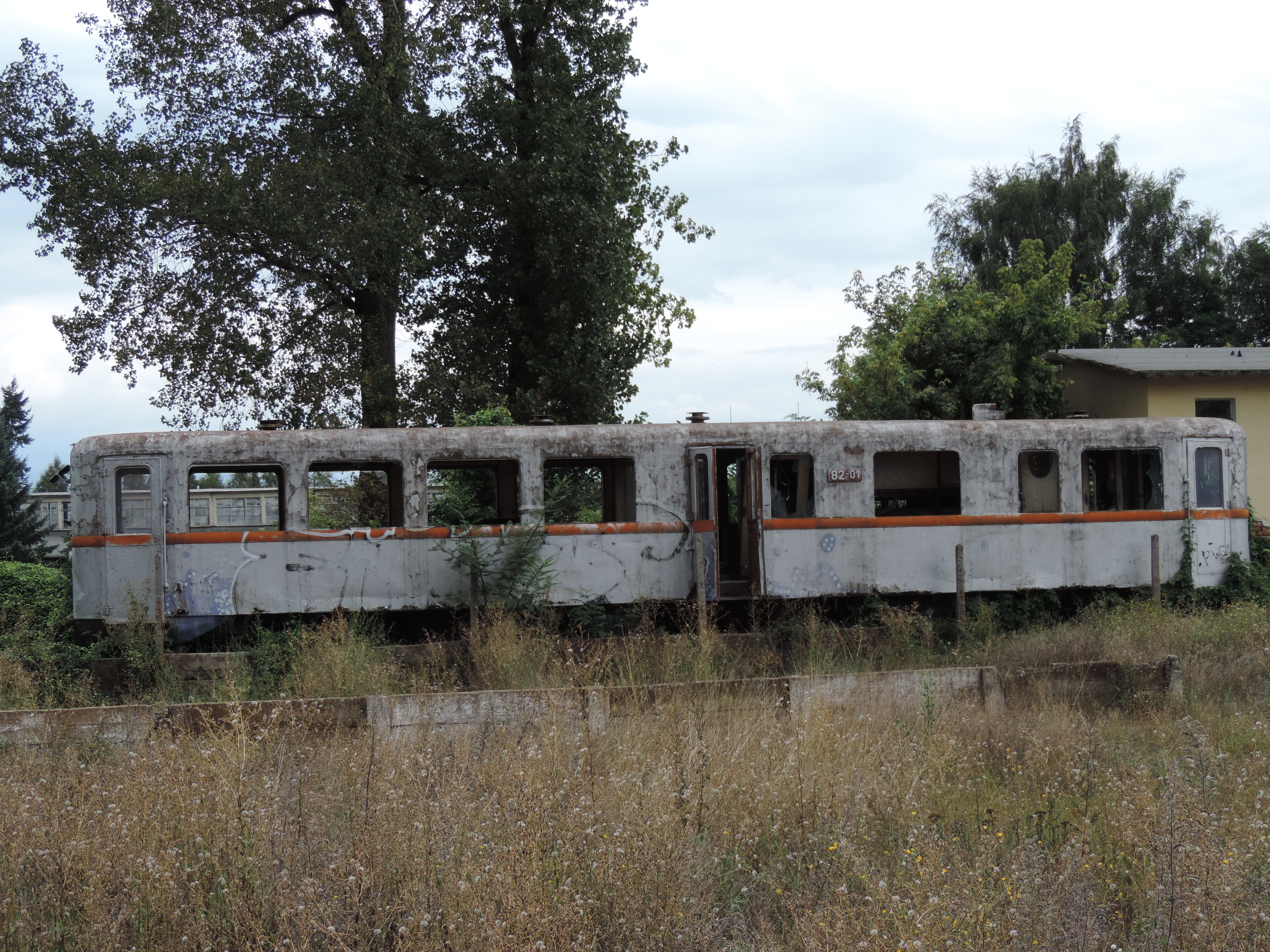
Specifications
- Wheelbase
  - Bogie: 1,700 mm (5 ft 7 in)
- Pivot pitch: 11,900 mm (39 ft 1 in)
- Fuel capacity: 335 L (74 imp gal; 88 US gal)

The vehicles of the BDŽ class 05 04-07 (later class 82 01-04) were four-axle Diesel–mechanical railcars for the 760 mm narrow-gauge railways of the Bulgarian State Railways (BDŽ).

== History ==
The three four-axle narrow gauge railcars of BDŽ class 05 01-03 which were procured in 1941 had proven very good in operation on the Rhodope Railway. In order to cope with the increase in traffic after the Second World War, the BDŽ procured four diesel railcars from Ganz Works Budapest in 1952 again. They were similar in construction and appearance to the vehicles of 1941, but more powerfully motorized with a power of 320 hp (240 kW). Originally, they were given the same series designation 05 with the ordinal numbers 04-07. From 1965, the four new vehicles were assigned the new class designation 82. With the railcars, six in appearance identical trailers were procured, of which two more followed in 1961.

Originally, the railcars were used as well as the three prewar railcars in Septemvri. Among other things, they handled the total traffic between Varvara and Pazardzhik commuting six times a day. Their use on the Rhodope Railway lasted until 1966, when the new class 75 took over all traffic on the route. All railcars were relocated to Cherven Bryag, where they took over a large part of the passenger train service. They could not completely replace the steam locomotives. The use of the narrow gauge railway to Oryahovo lasted until 1977, when the new class 76 took over the traffic.

Some car bodies have been preserved after being removed from storage. Thus, a sidecar wreck in Oryahovo behind the station building and in Cherven Bryag two rail car body and a trailer body have been preserved. As a monument, the railcar 82-01 was set up in Bansko.

At their delivery, the vehicles had a very modern silver-gray paint. Later, some vehicles were painted blue in the lower half and white in the upper half. Whether vehicles of this series, is not known, all known photos with vehicles of the series 81 have a silver-gray paint.

== Technical features ==
For narrow-gauge conditions these vehicles were designed quite large, much larger than the known narrow-gauge railcars DR 137 322 to 325, which they still towered by three meters in length. But they had about the same number of seats as this series.

In one end of the steel skeleton construction of the car body were placed the seats in wood lath construction and in the other end the machinery. Where the diesel engine was located, there was a luggage and payload compartment. The cargo compartment was closed with a central folding door, the entrances for the passengers were via the doors close to the end of the railcar. The entry spaces were the workplaces for the engine driver, on the end not used the controls could be closed by roller blinds. The trailers were similarly designed, they lacked the payload compartments and the center doors. But they had a significantly higher capacity with 62 seats.

The engine was Ganz VIII Iat 170/240 that produced 320 hp (240 kW) and the power transmission was mechanical. The engine gave its torque to the four-speed transmission lying exactly in the middle of the car, both bogie wheels were driven by Cardan shafts. This arrangement gave the railcar an extraordinarily high frictional weight, enabling it to handle any situation on the mountain railway.

== Sources ==
Translated from BDŽ-Baureihe 05 04–07
