= OSE class A.151 =

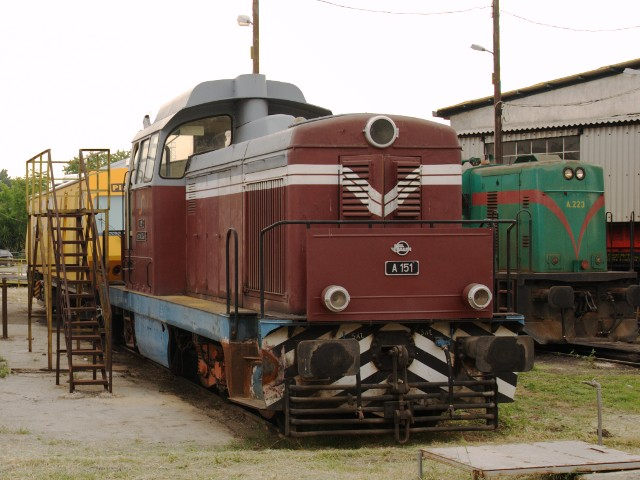
- Α.151 in Agios Ioannis Rentis Depot in 2009
Type and origin
- Build date: 1972
Specifications
- Gauge: Standard
- Power supply: Hydraulic diesel oil
Performance figures
- Maximum speed: 70 km/h
- Power output: 507 kW
Career
- Operators: TrainOSE
- Numbers: A.151-A.162

OSE class A.151 (Faur LDH70) is a series of locomotives operated by TRAINOSE, which are part of TRAINOSE fleet. They were built by Faur in 1972. They resemble the class A.171, but their main difference is that the A.171 have engines with combined power of 920 kW while A.151 have engines with combined power of 507 kW, but have the same speed, faces and manufacturers, while being diesel driven. In total, there are 12 such machines. It reaches speeds of up to 70 kilometers per hour in course order and 35 in shunting. Class A.101 locomotives are based in the Rentis depot. They are four-axled locomotives from the existing production line. They were weighing 48 tons and 700 hp.

== Route ==
Today only 2 locomotives are available only for shunting

== History ==
In the 1970s, the newly-founded OSE is also focused on supplies from Eastern countries. In 1972, OSE buys 12 shunters, numbered A.151 to A.162, from Romanian Faur. Similar machines also circulated in Poland, Hungary and elsewhere. In 1979, seven more diesel locomotives were added, but with a stronger 750 hp engine. They were numbered A.171 to A.177. Faur engines have been working for almost 30 years.

== Livery ==
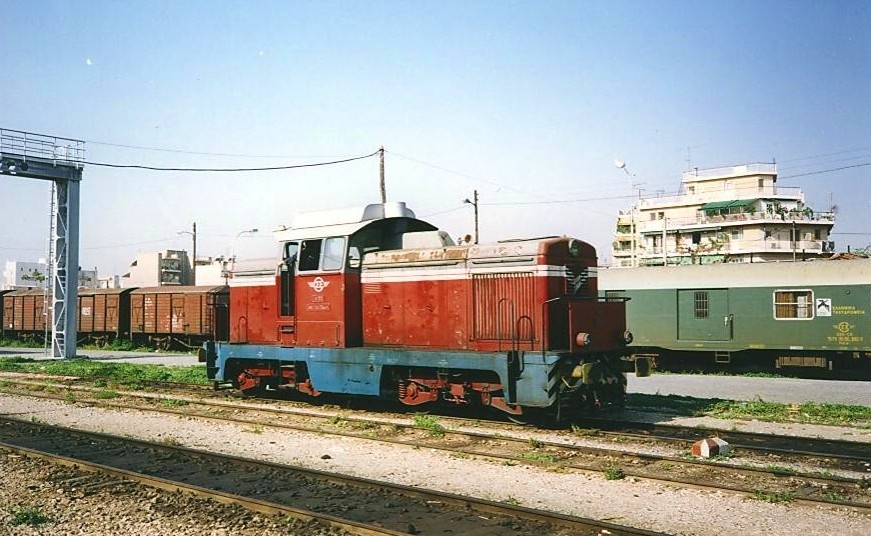
Class A.151 locomotive with the old OSE logo at Larissa Station

The coloring of the locomotives consists of a white vertical stripe on a brown color covering the largest surface of the vehicles. In the masks, these strips join together, creating a triangle.
