= BDŽ class 81 01-03 =

Four-axle diesel–mechanical railcar

BDŽ class 05 01–03 BDŽ class 81 01-03
- In service: 1941–1975
- Manufacturer: Ganz Works, Budapest
- Constructed: 1941
- Number built: 3
- Fleet numbers: BDŽ: 05 01–03; BDŽ: 81 01–03

Specifications
- Car length: 17,000 mm (55 ft 9 1/4 in) over buffers
- Wheel diameter: 720 mm (2 ft 4 3/8 in)
- Wheelbase: 13,600 mm (44 ft 7 1/2 in)
- Maximum speed: 60 km/h (37 mph)
- Weight: Empty: 25 t (25 long tons; 28 short tons); Service: 31.4 t (30.9 long tons; 34.6 short tons)
- Axle load: 8 t (7.9 long tons; 8.8 short tons)
- Prime mover(s): Ganz Works VI IaT 170/240
- Engine type: Six cylinder four-stroke diesel engine
- Power output: 162 kW (220 PS; 217 hp)
- Tractive effort: 40 kN (8,990 lbf)
- Transmission: Diesel–mechanical
- UIC classification: B′B′
- Minimum turning radius: 60 m (197 ft)
- Braking system(s): Knorr-Bremse compressed air brake hand brake
- Track gauge: 760 mm (2 ft 5 15/16 in)

The vehicles of the BDŽ class 05 01-03 (later class 81 01-03) were four-axle Diesel–mechanical railcars designed for the 760 mm narrow-gauge railways of the Bulgarian State Railways (BDŽ).

== History ==
Since there were many tunnels on the Rhodope Railway, there was naturally also a great deal of annoyance on the part of the staff and passengers traveling uphill through the exhaust fumes of the locomotives. Therefore, the BDŽ decided already in the year of the opening in 1939 to procure diesel railcars for comfort improvement.

1941 followed then the delivery of three motor coaches and three additional trailers with a seat capacity of 62 seats. Seven similar railcars had been delivered in 1938 to the Yugoslav Railways for the local narrow gauge network as a series 801. The railcars were used only on the Rhodope Railway. In 1952, four more railcars of BDŽ class 05 04-07 were ordered with increased power. Earliest timetables for the vehicles are known only from the year 1969, where the first railcar now designated as 81-01 covered the connection between Varvara and Pazardzhik six times daily. Much earlier, in 1963, the railcar 81-03 had already been retired. After the appearance of the new class 75, the vehicles were not resettled together with the class 82 to Cherven Bryag, but they remained in Septemvri. The withdrawal took place in 1973 (81-01) and 1975 (81-02). Another sign of life is not to be found for the vehicles. They were stationed until their cancellation in Septemvri, the subject of the photo created in 2015 could come from the pre-war production.

At their delivery, the vehicles had a very modern silver-gray paint. Later, some vehicles were painted blue in the lower half and white in the upper half. Whether vehicles of this series, is not known, all known photos with vehicles of the series 81 have a silver-gray paint.

== Technical features ==
The vehicles were optimally designed for the conditions of the Rhodopebahn as mountain railcars with the highest friction weight (identical to the service mass). For narrow-gauge conditions they were designed quite large, much larger than the known narrow-gauge railcars DR 137 322 to 325, which they still towered by three meters in length. But they had about the same number of seats as this series.

In one end of the steel skeleton construction of the car body were placed the seats in wood lath construction and in the other end the machinery. Where the diesel engine was located, there was a luggage and payload compartment. The cargo compartment was closed with a central folding door, the entrances for the passengers were via the doors close to the end of the railcar. The entry spaces were the workplaces for the engine driver, on the end not used the controls could be closed by roller blinds. The trailers were similarly designed, they lacked the payload compartments and the center doors. But they had a significantly higher capacity with 62 seats.

About the machinery it is known that the engine was Ganz VI IaT 170/240 that produced 220 hp (160 kW) and the power transmission was mechanical. The engine gave its torque to the four-speed transmission lying exactly in the middle of the car, both bogie wheels were driven by Cardan shafts. This arrangement gave the railcar an extraordinarily high frictional weight, enabling it to handle any situation on the mountain railway.

== Sources ==
Translated from BDŽ-Baureihe 05 01–03
