= DB Class V 169 =

DB Class V 169 / DB Class 219
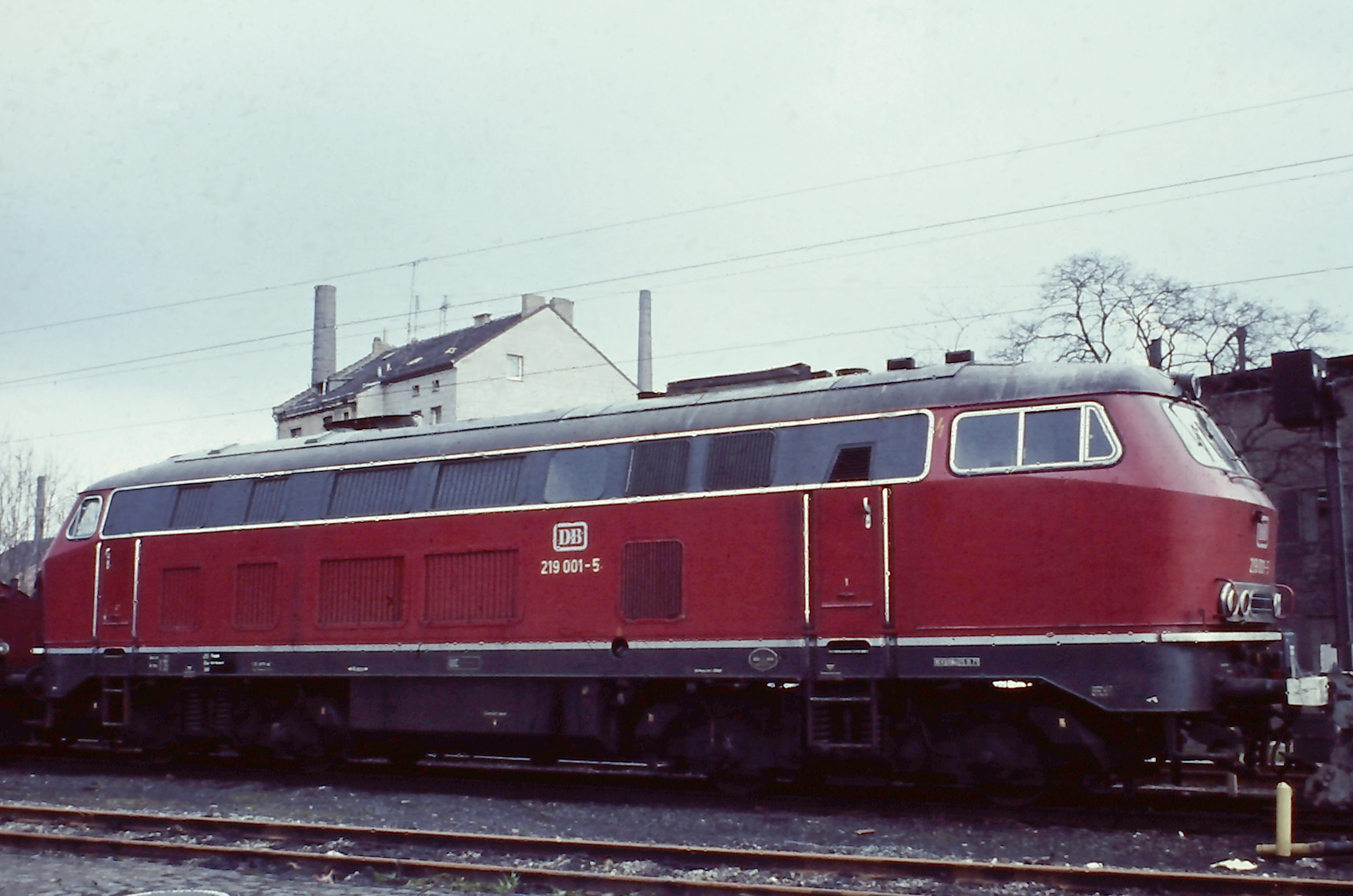
- Diesel locomotive 219 001-5
Type and origin
- Power type: Diesel reciprocating engine with gas turbine booster
- Builder: Klöckner-Humboldt-Deutz (See Deutz AG)
- Build date: 1965
- Total produced: 1
- Rebuilder: Gmeinder
- Rebuild date: 1999
Specifications
- Configuration
  - UIC: Bo′Bo′
- Gauge: 1,435 mm (4 ft 8 1/2 in)
- Length: 16.4 m (53 ft 9.7 in)
- Loco weight: 76.7 t (75.5 long tons; 84.5 short tons)
- Fuel capacity: 3,330 L (730 imp gal; 880 US gal)
- Prime mover: As built: Maybach MD 870 1B plus General Electric gas turbine built under license After Gmeinder rebuild: Caterpillar 3516 B - TA-JW, no gas turbine.
- Engine type: diesel engine + gas turbine
- Cylinders: 12
- Transmission: Hydraulic
- Safety systems: ETCS
Performance figures
- Maximum speed: originally: 130 km/h (81 mph) after rebuilding: 120 km/h (75 mph)
- Power output: As built: 2,150 hp (1,600 kW) + 900 hp (670 kW) gas turbine After Gmeinder rebuild: 2,000 kW (2,700 hp)
Career
- Operators: Deutsche Bundesbahn; Impresa Attilio Rossi; Bahngesellschaft Waldhof AG (BGW); Eisenbahnen und Verkehrsbetriebe Elbe Weser GmbH (EVB); Lokrapid
- Locale: Federal Republic of Germany; Italy
- Retired: 1978
- Restored: 2022
- Current owner: Lokrapid (Roland Sandkuhl)

The DB Class V 169 consisted of a single example: V 169 001, derived from the DB Class V 160 family, with an additional gas turbine booster engine. It can be considered the prototype for diesel locomotives with a gas turbine as an additional drive; specifically the DB Class 210. Post 1968 the class designation was changed to Class 219, and the locomotive renumbered 219 001

In 1999 the locomotive was heavily renovated for a private company, and does not now have the gas turbine.

Post the merger of the Deutsche Bundesbahn and Deutsche Reichsbahn another locomotive - the DR Class 119 has been assigned to the DB class 219.

== Background ==
From 1963 onwards the DB Class V 160 had been delivered and deployed in large numbers, and was proving successful. Thus plans were made for testing of further units - specifically a variant with electric train heating. These units would require more power than the engines installed in the V 160 could deliver. Three prototype units of the DB Class V 162 (later Class 217) were ordered; with the addition of a smaller supplementary diesel engine, providing via a generator the electricity for electric train supply. (see Head end power)

Another variant was the V 169, this locomotive utilised a supplementary gas turbine to improve overall performance. A General Electric LM 100-PA 104 turbine was chosen, using diesel as a fuel rather than kerosene. The locomotive turbine was built under license by Klöckner-Humboldt-Deutz (KHD) at the Oberursel plant. (see Motorenfabrik Oberursel (now part of Rolls-Royce)

KHD also received the order for manufacture of the locomotive itself, this was done at the KHD-Werk in Cologne and the locomotive delivered on the 4 June 1965 as V 169 001, it then was exhibited to the public at the International Transport Exhibition in Munich. The electric train heating was not yet ready, and so the locomotive did not enter service until January 1966.

From March 1966 the locomotive went onto the Allgäu Munich to Lindau line for testing, being stationed at Kempten.

In the V 169, the electrical generator for the heating was powered by a shaft from the gearbox of the hydraulic transmission system. This method proved successful and was later used in the DB Class 210 and DB Class 218 locomotives. The fundamental usefulness of the additional gas turbine propulsion was also demonstrated and led to the introduction of the DB Class 210 (with a more powerful turbine: an AVCO Lycoming T53-L 13).

== Service history ==
The delivery of the Class 210s being to Kempten in 1971 for work in the Allgaeu region meant that the less powerful V 219 001 was outdated. Thus, when the gas turbine failed with damage to the combustion chamber in 1974, the locomotive was converted for other uses. The diesel engine was throttled back to 1,400 kW (1,900 hp), and the heating system was also shut down.

With these modifications, the locomotive was no longer suitable for passenger work, and began work as a freight locomotive around Gelsenkirchen often working across the Dutch border, up to 25 November 1977. In 1978, the locomotive was decommissioned and then left in the open in Bremen until 1985.

In 1985 the locomotive was sold to company of Elizabeth Layritz GmbH in Penzberg, a firm specialising in the modernisation of scrapped locomotives. Subsequently, the locomotive was sold to Impresa Attilio Rossi in Italy and worked between Rome and Naples (as T1591) up till 1998/9.

=== Reconstruction and operation by German private railways ===
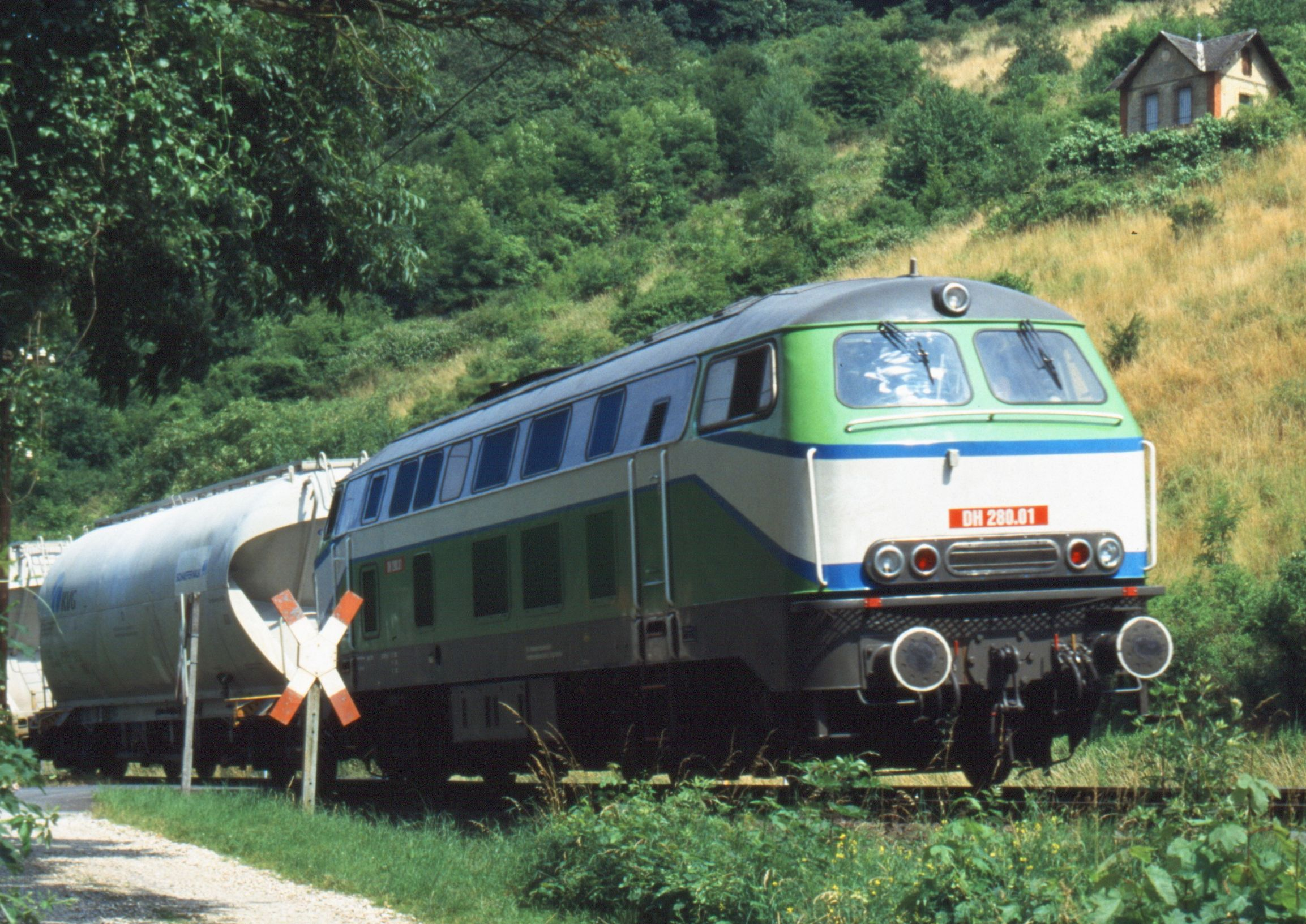
Numbered as DH 280.01 on Lime train between Stromberg and Schweppenhausen

After the German railway reform of 1994 cheap second-hand locomotives with authorization for work in Germany were in demand. So in 1999 the locomotive was bought (back to Germany) by leasing firm RailImpex and sent to Gmeinder for refurbishment and remotoring,.

The refurbishment included the replacement of the original Maybach engine with a Caterpillar diesel engine, a review of its condition and the installation of new wiring.

The railway company Waldhof AG ('Bahngesellschaft Waldhof AG or 'BGW') (Now called Rhenus Rail Logistics GmbH) in Mannheim bought the locomotive for freight work and designated it as DH 280 01. It was painted in the green-gray color scheme of the BGW.

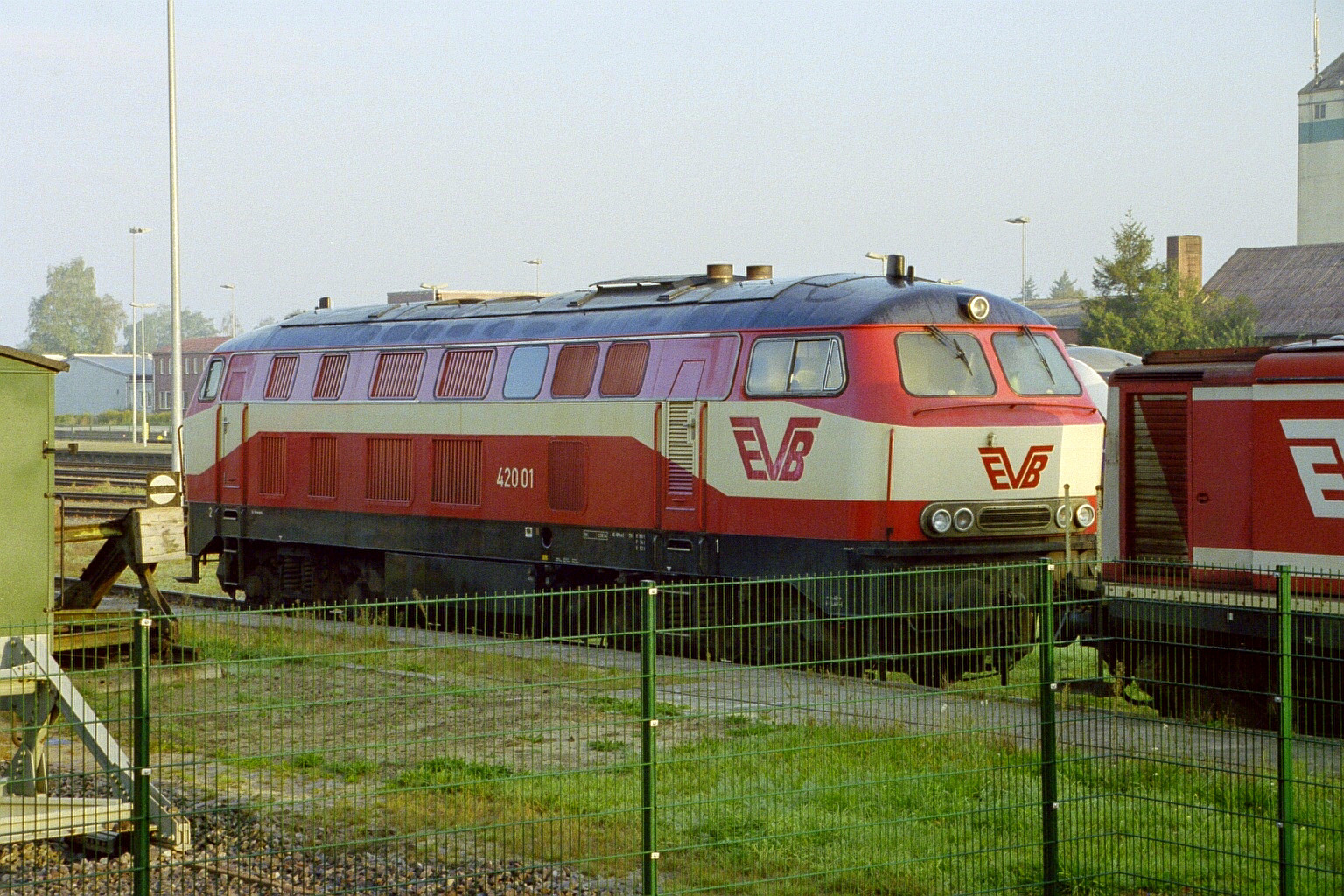
Under EVB ownership, renumbered 420 01 (October 2006) and with a new livery

In the summer of 2000, the loco was used for garbage trains from Krefeld to Hildesheim until September when a collision meant the machine must return to Gmeinder for repair. By February 2001 it was back in operation. After that, among other workings it pulled Lime trains for BASF from Ludwigshafen to Stromberg.

In October 2001 the unit was transferred to Eisenbahnen und Verkehrsbetriebe Elbe-Weser GmbH and worked on container trains between Hamburg, Bremerhaven and Bremen. The EVB designation is 420 01

The locomotive suffered a serious accident with frame damage in 2013 and was placed out of service, being parked in the Bremervörde depot since August 2015.

=== Roland Sandkuhl ===
In August 2021 the V169 was purchased by locomotive driver Roland Sandkuhl, who founded his own company LOKRAPID (LR) in Oldenburg. In 2022 Sandkuhl restored the locomotive and repainted it in its original DB livery, with respectively each of the ends carrying one of the locomotive's former official numbers V 169 001 and 219 001-5. It went back in service on 20 September 2022 under the UIC number "92 80 1219 001-5 D-LR", operating various trains.

== See also ==
- DB Class V 160 family Overview of this and related locomotives
- DB Class 210 Related successor locomotives also with auxiliary gas turbines
- DR Class 119 An East German diesel locomotive (reclassified after reunification as DB Class 219)
