= DB Class 210 =

Diesel locomotives series

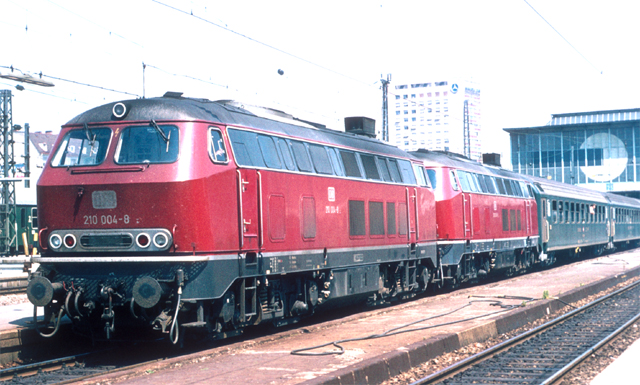
- Two DB 210 locomotives at Munich station (1973)
Type and origin
- Power type: Diesel internal combustion engine, plus gas turbine booster engine
- Builder: Krupp
- Serial number: 210 001-008
- Build date: ~1970
- Total produced: 8
- Rebuild date: 1980–1981
- Number rebuilt: 8
Specifications
- Configuration
  - UIC: Bo′Bo′
- Gauge: 1,435 mm (4 ft 8 1/2 in)
- Length: 16.4 m (53 ft 9.7 in)
- Loco weight: 82 t (81 long tons; 90 short tons)
- Fuel type: Diesel
- Prime mover: Main engine: MTU 12V 956 TB 10; Turbine: AVCO Lycoming T53-L 13
- Engine type: Main engine: diesel engine Secondary: Gas turbine
- Cylinders: 12
- Transmission: hydraulic
- Loco brake: hydrodynamic pneumatic
- Train brakes: pneumatic
- Safety systems: ETCS
Performance figures
- Maximum speed: 160 km/h (99 mph)
- Power output: 1,839 kW or 2,466 hp main diesel plus 845 kW or 1,133 hp turbine
- Tractive effort: Starting 235 kN (53,000 lb_{f})

The Class 210 of the Deutsche Bundesbahn (abbreviation DB) consisted of a series of eight diesel locomotives, with a top speed of 160 km/h intended for operations on express trains. The locomotives were peculiar in that an additional gas turbine engine was able to provide extra power when needed. The additional turbine made it, at the time, the strongest four-axle German diesel locomotive.

Derived from a prototype, classified as DB Class V 169 (later named Class 219), the locomotives had a ten-year service life, from ~1970 to ~1980, at which point they were rebuilt as a subclass of the conventional DB Class 218.

Another set of locomotives the Class 210.4 also had the '210' number, being rebuilt from DB Class 218s in the late 1990s for faster (160 km/h) express passenger operations.

== History and background of Gas Turbine locomotives ==
In the 1950s the Swiss Federal gas turbine locomotive, the Am 4/6 1101 was tested by the German railways: Its higher fuel consumption compared to the DB Class V 200.0 made it uneconomical for the Deutsche Bundesbahn to consider introducing similar locomotives and afterwards reciprocating diesel engines were the primary source of non-electric traction on German raillines.

In the 1960s, the first locomotives of the V160 series went into service; these were originally designed for medium-duty service. For more demanding applications such as express passenger work and freight trains on non-electrified routes (such as the winding route from Munich to Lindau) the Deutsche Bundesbahn considered an enhanced performance version of these locomotives; for this reason, the concept of a locomotive of V160 series with a gas turbine as a booster was investigated. The gas turbine had the advantage of low weight and size – particularly important if it was to be included in the standard body of a V160 class locomotive.

Because the turbine would only be activated when additional power was required (such as accelerating from speeds above 25 km/h and on inclines) the effect of the high fuel consumption of the turbine would be minimised. The output from the turbine was to be input on an additional stage on the hydraulic transmission. This concept was successfully tested in the DB V 169 001 locomotive built in 1965 (as of 1968, the reporting name was 219 001).

However, the Deutsche Bahn decided that the successor to this locomotive should have a more powerful gas turbine and the AVCO Lycoming T 53-L13 was selected which had already been selected for use in the Bundeswehr's Bell UH-1 D helicopters. The Klöckner-Humboldt-Deutz factory (see Deutz AG Motorenfabrik Oberursel (now part of Rolls-Royce Germany) made the engines for the German Army under license, and was able to maintain and repair the turbines.

Thus from 1970 onwards the Class 210 was born.

== Technical ==
Except the turbine and transmission modifications the Class 210 are basically identical to the DB Class 218; They have the same 12-cylinder engine from MTU of type MA 12 V 956 TB 10, and the same electrical system and roughly the same chassis.

The Class 210 was however geared for a higher maximum speed of 160 km/h and therefore had an additional hydrodynamic brake as well. For the same reason modifications to the drive shaft were made as well as an increased brake pad.

Since the gas turbines optimum performance was at a speed of 19250 rpm, the output was geared down to 6000 rpm for the hydraulic drive. The main diesel and gas turbine (as in the Class 219 001) had two independent drive shafts with the output connected by gears. Each hydraulic chamber could be filled and emptied independently.

The turbine was based on an 845 kilowatt design but was throttled back in order to prevent damage to the other components. The main power was supplied by the diesel – the gas turbine was either on or off, or on idle mode. The chimney like exhaust for the turbine on the locomotive roof was the main distinguishing feature between a Class 210 and similar but conventionally powered locomotives such as the Class 218.

== Operations ==
Since the DB V 169-001 (DB 219 001) had already proven sufficiently that a locomotive of this type would work the Class 210 went into normal operations fairly quickly – between the end of 1970 and the beginning of 1971 the locomotives began operations, by the end of 1971 all eight locomotives had been introduced to the railway centre (Bahnbetriebswerk or Bw.) at Kempten and were in scheduled operation. This included work in the Allgaeu region, and trains such as the TEE Bavaria and heavy express trains on the segment from Munich to Lindau.

At first the locomotives entirely met the performance expected of them, however, the train heating in the winter was a little weak, so that then often two locomotives of series 210 for heavy trains were needed.

The Bw. Kempten had a special maintenance shop built for the gas turbines, with the staff trained in the maintenance of Klöckner-Humboldt-Deutz machines. When major repairs were needed, the affected turbine was transported to the manufacturer in a special container. To avoid having any locomotive out of operation the Bundesbahn held in stock two gas turbines (in total 10), for the eight locomotives, and the turnaround time for turbine replacement was six hours.

The on 23 March 1978, a turbine failed catastrophically: 210 003 was in travelling on the Kempten-east track under full power when a turbine impeller broke. As a result, all the turbines were inspected – some were found to have signs of fatigue and were exchanged, by 13 October 1978 all the machines went back into service with the gas turbine engines in operation. Unfortunately, shortly afterwards on 31 December 1978 en route to Eichenau, a compressor impeller broke and cut a fuel line – leaving the turbine room of the locomotive on fire.

Although the fire was quickly extinguished in Fürstenfeldbruck station, and the locomotive spared serious damage the Deutsche Bundesbahn had to cease use of the turbines and investigate – it was found that the frequent restarting of the turbines was shortening their lifespan – leading (i.e. a shorter than expected time between failures than what was expected from examples of use in helicopters whose turbines were in continuous operation.)

An effort was made to prevent further accidents, by undertaking maintenance more frequently, and replacing more often – however the costs of this, coupled with the already high fuel costs of operations meant that the locomotives became uneconomic; as a consequence, the DB decide to remove the gas turbines and converted the entire class to conventional reciprocating engine operations – these rebuilt locomotives were designated DB Class 218.9

=== Conversion to Class 218.9 ===
The turbine, exhausts, and controller were removed, the hydraulic gearbox was changed, and ballast was added to make up the weight. As part of the changes the maximum speed was reduced from 160 km/h to 140 km / h. The dates of conversion are shown in the table:

| Date of rebuilding | Previous Classification number | New Classification number |
|---|---|---|
| 8 February 1980 | 210 007 | 218 907 |
| 30 May 1980 | 210 003 | 218 903 |
| 2 October 1980 | 210 005 | 218 905 |
| 4 December 1980 | 210 006 | 218 906 |
| 10 February 1981 | 210 001 | 218 901 |
| 24 February 1981 | 210 002 | 218 902 |
| 22 April 1981 | 210 008 | 218 908 |
| 22 July 1981 | 210 004 | 218 904 |

From then on, the heavy passenger trains of the Allgäu lines were pulled with two Class 218 locomotives. The converted gas-turbine locomotives initially stayed at Bw. Kempten and were used in the same roles as other Class 218 locomotives. From 1983, the locomotives were stationed at Bw. Braunschweig, and from 2001 at Stendal.

Between the years of 2004 and 2006, all locomotives of the series 218.9 were decommissioned and later scrapped.

== DBAG Class 210.4 ==
The DBAG had twelve locomotives of Class 218 rebuilt to have a top speed of 160 km/h between September 1996 and January 1999. In January 1999 the locomotives were classified as a new subseries: Class 210.4.

The locomotives do not have turbines, but the reclassification was done to reflect the fact that they have a 160 km/h top speed, as did the original Class 210.

The modifications were made because in 1996 the inter-city connection from Hamburg to Berlin needed to run faster but the route had not then been fully electrified. The locomotives were numbered 210.430 to 210.434 and 210.456 to 210.462 – 12 in total, stationed at Lübeck
