= BDŽ class 77 =

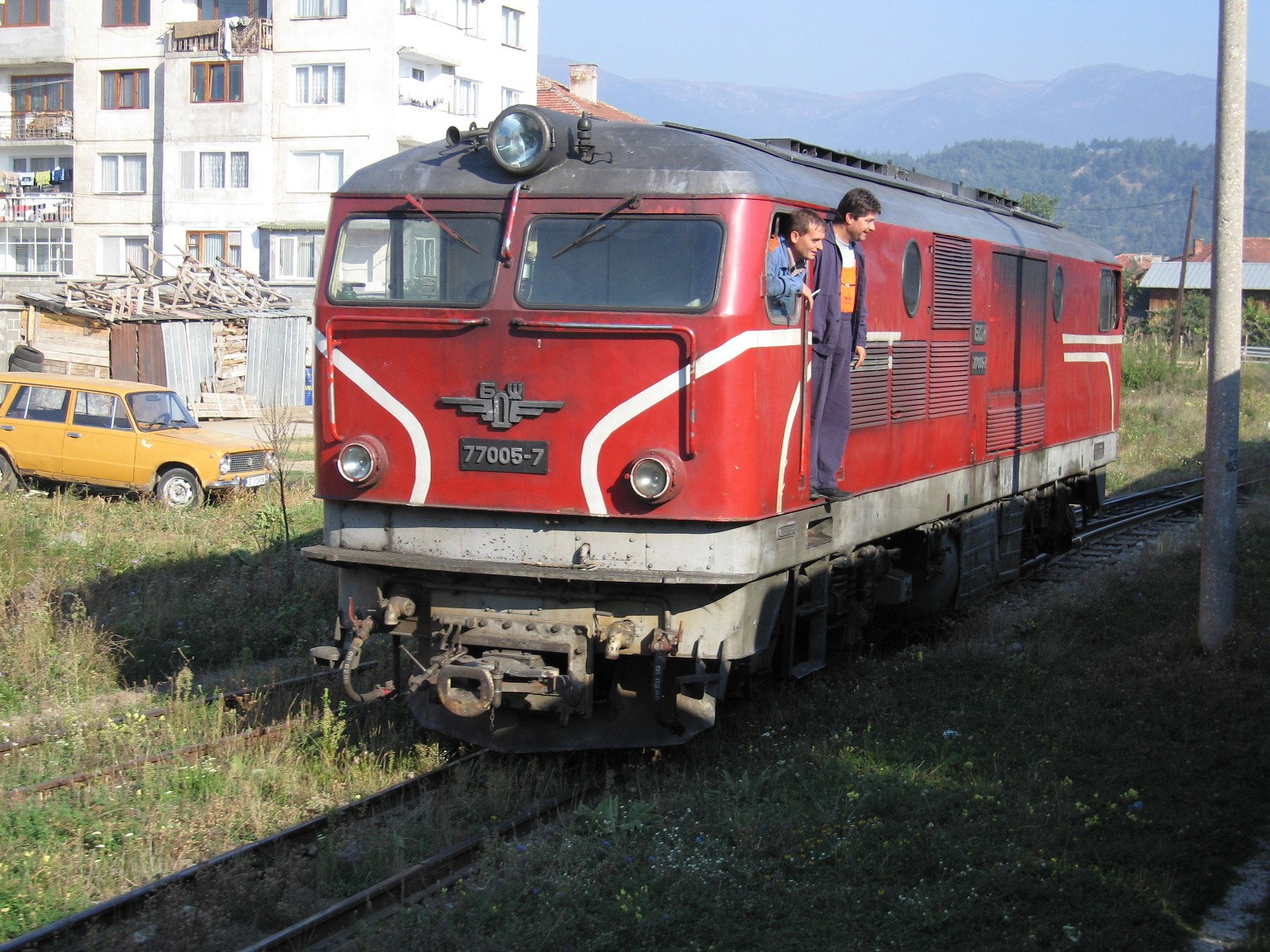
Type and origin
- Power type: Diesel-hydraulic
- Builder: FAUR – Bucharest
- Build date: 1988
- Total produced: 10
Specifications
- Configuration
  - UIC: B'B'
- Gauge: 760 mm (2 ft 5 15/16 in) Bosnian gauge
- Wheel diameter: 1,000 mm (3 ft 3 3/8 in)
- Length
  - Over couplers: 13,330 mm (43 ft 9 in)
- Width: 2,470 mm (8 ft 1 in)
- Height: 3,520 mm (11 ft 7 in)
- Axle load: 13.25 t (13.04 long tons; 14.61 short tons)
- Loco weight: total: 52 t (51 long tons; 57.5 short tons), empty: 48.5 t (47.5 long tons; 53.5 short tons)
- Transmission: Hydraulic
Performance figures
- Maximum speed: 60 km/h (37 mph)
- Power output: Engines: 1,100 hp (820 kW)
Career
- Operators: BDŽ
- Numbers: 77 001 - 77 010
- Disposition: 4 preserved, 5 sold to Argentina, 1 scrapped

The locomotives were built and delivered by the Romanian plant "23 August" (now FAUR) - Bucharest under technical conditions of BDZ. Maximum interchangeability of aggregates, assemblies and parts with the class 76 machines, built in the same plant, was pursued. The main differences are:

- altered gear ratio, reducing the maximum speed in favor of traction;
- increased number of engine cooling radiators;
- changed how the engine is coupled with the hydro compound;
- numerous improvements to the engine (driving mode, increased power output, etc.);
- more cab controls, control devices, etc.

All class 77 locomotives were assigned to the Septemvri depot. This was fully equipped for narrow-gauge locomotives at the time. Since the early 1990s there has been a drastic decline in transport, when almost half of the locomotive fleet was stored. This was relieved in 1996 when members of the class were sold to Argentina. They were loaded onto standard gauge wagons and shipped off via the port of Bourgas on March 20, 1996. They worked a narrow-gauge railroad between the coal mines in the Rio Turbio village and the Rio Galegos port (about 200 km (120 mi) apart) in the Santa Cruz area of Patagonia. One of the remaining five locomotives was scrapped and the rest continue to work on the Septemvri–Dobrinishte narrow-gauge line.

== Operational and Factory Data for Locomotives ==
Operational number	fabr. № / year	Notes
77 001.6	25325/1988	Sold to Argentina 1996
77 002.4	25326/1988	Overhauled by Express Service Rouse, Has stayed in depot Septemvri until 30.09.2022 because of missing certificate. Operating
77 003.2	25327/1988	Sold to Argentina 1996
77 004.0	25328/1988	Sold to Argentina 1996
77 005.7	25329/1988	
77 006.5	25330/1988	Scrapped 2004
77 007.3	25331/1988	Sold to Argentina 1996
77 008.1	25332/1988	
77 009.9	25333/1988	For overhaul in Express Service Rouse
77 010.7	25334/1988	Sold to Argentina 1996

== Sources ==
1. Translated from Локомотиви БДЖ серия 77.000
2. Димитър Деянов, Локомотивното стопанство на БДЖ 1947 – 1990, Sofia, 1993
