= DR Class 119 =

Class of East German diesel-hydraulic locomotives

DR Class 119 DBAG Class 219
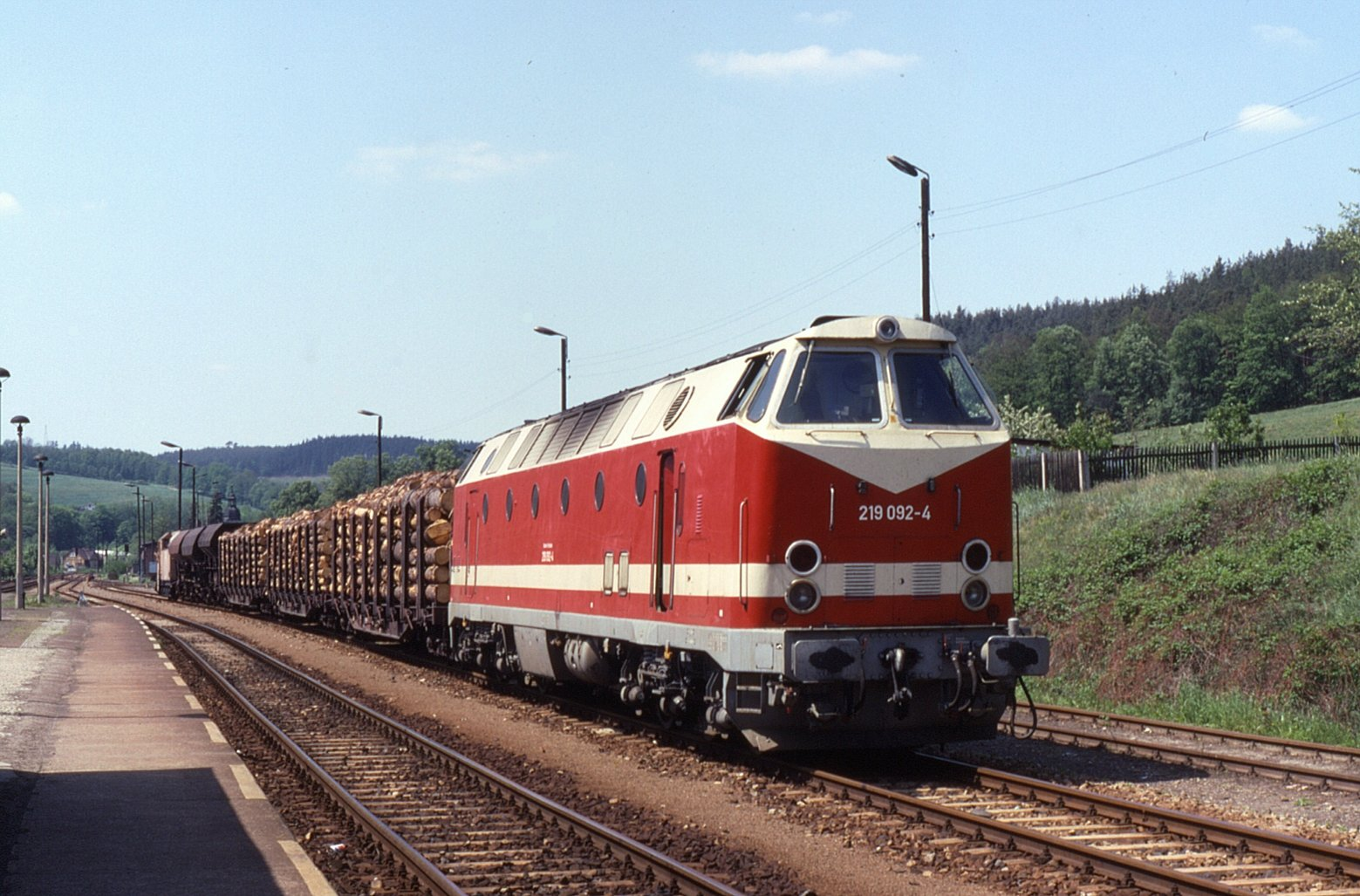
- 219 092 (ex 119 092) at Rottenbach (Thüringen) on a train of logs, May 1993.
Type and origin
- Builder: "23 August" Bucharest Locomotive Works
- Build date: 1976–1985
- Total produced: 200
Specifications
- Configuration
  - UIC: C′C′
  - Commonwealth: C-C
- Gauge: 1,435 mm (4 ft 8 1/2 in)
- Wheel diameter: 1,000 mm (3 ft 3 3/8 in)
- Wheelbase
  - Engine: 14,510 mm (47 ft 7 1/4 in)
  - Bogie: 1,800 mm (5 ft 10 7/8 in)
- Pivot centres: 10,910 mm (35 ft 9 1/2 in)
- Length
  - Over buffers: 19,500 mm (63 ft 11 3/4 in)
- Width: 3,130 mm (10 ft 3 1/4 in)
- Height: 4,250 mm (13 ft 11 3/8 in)
- Axle load: 16 t
- Service weight: 99 t / 101 t
- Fuel capacity: 4,000 litres (880 imp gal; 1,100 US gal)
- Prime mover: DB M 820 SR or; JMW 12KVD21-AL4 or; JMW 12KVD21-AL5
- Transmission: hydrodynamic
- Train heating: Electric
- Loco brake: Compressed air KNORR & DAKO driver's and auxiliary brake valves
Performance figures
- Maximum speed: 120 or 140 km/h (75 or 87 mph)
- Power output: 990 kW (1,350 PS; 1,330 hp) / 1,100 kW (1,500 PS; 1,480 hp) / 1,380 kW (1,880 PS; 1,850 hp) / 1,500 kW (2,040 PS; 2,010 hp) (×2)
- Tractive effort
  - Starting: 220 kN (49,000 lbf) / 270 kN (61,000 lbf)
Career
- Numbers: DR: 119 001 – 119 200; DR/DB: 219 003 – 219 200 DB: 229 ...
- Retired: by 2006

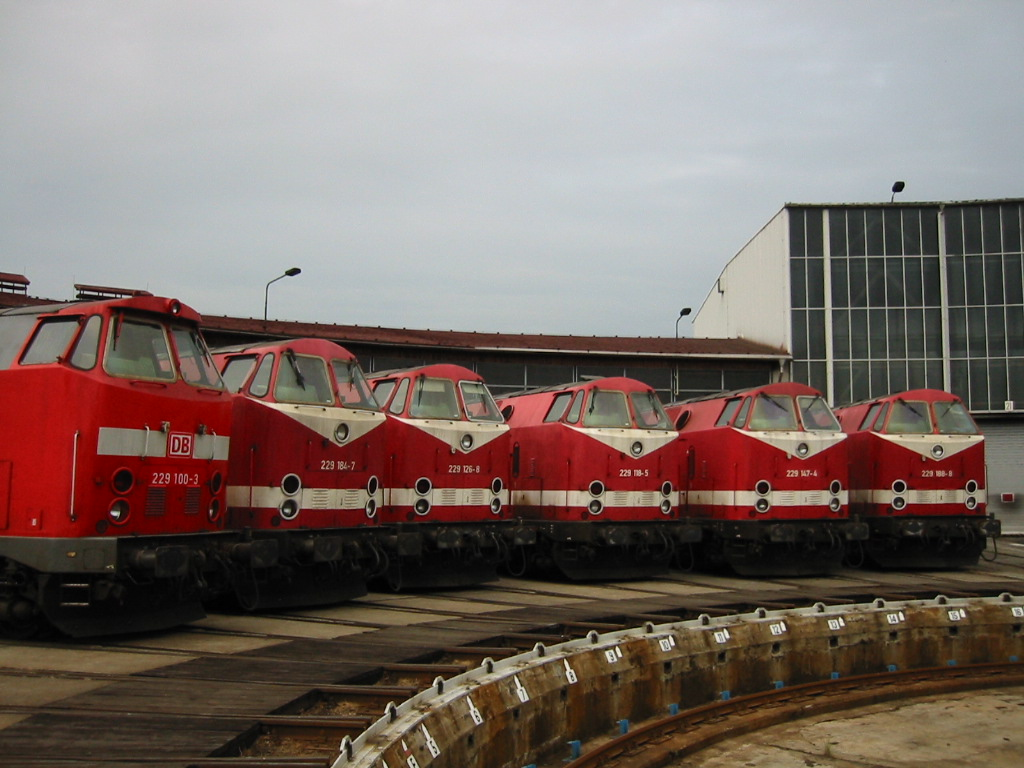
A "U-boat parade" in Gera (2002)

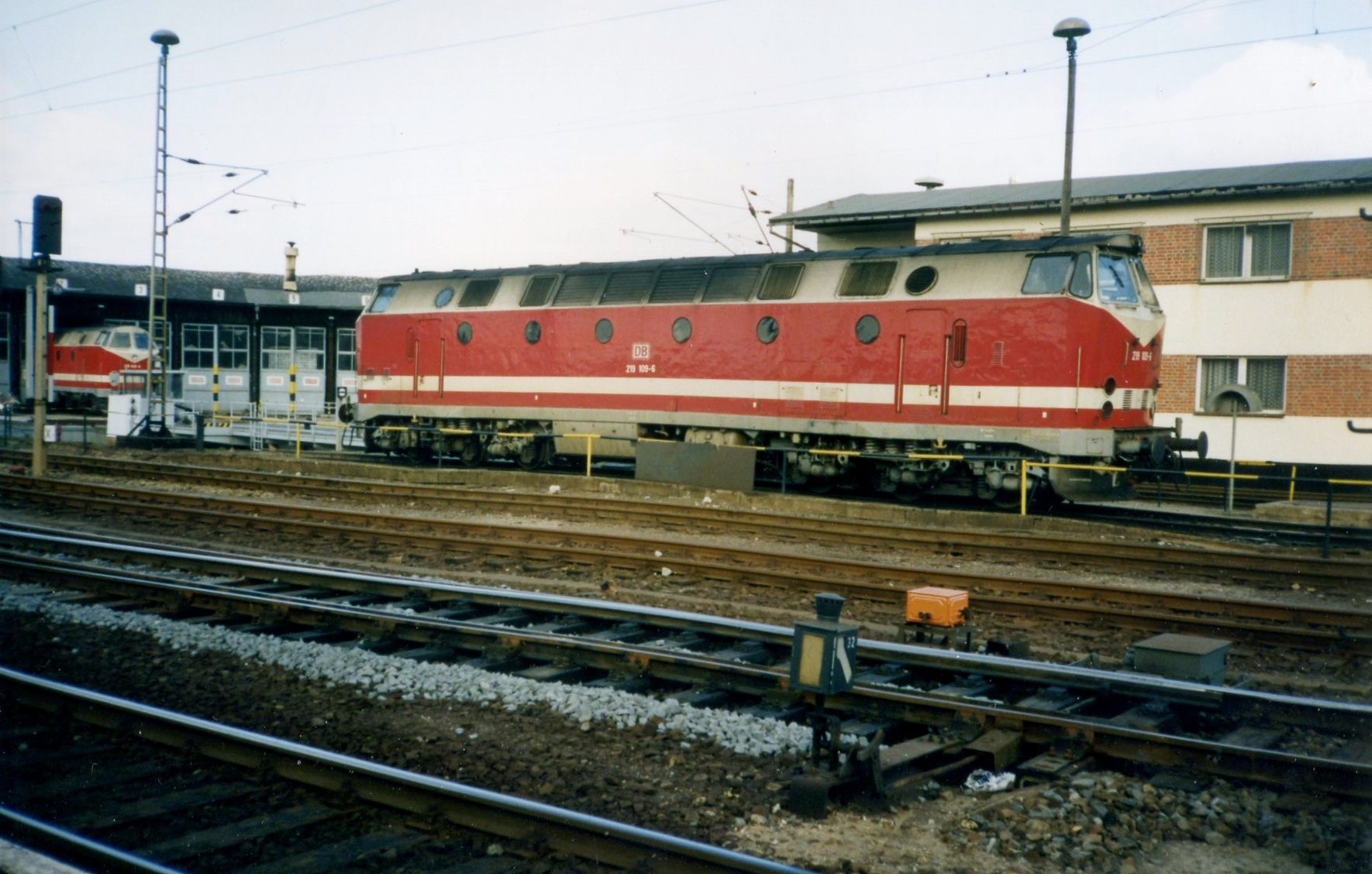
With several porthole bull's-eye windows and often "submerged" in work shops, the 119 was nick-named "U-boat"

The DR Class 119 was an East German Deutsche Reichsbahn diesel locomotive that was built in Romania, more or less as Design by committee of several communist countries. When the Deutsche Bahn AG formed up in 1993 it was redesignated as DB Class 219.

They were nicknamed "U-boats", "Karpatenschreck" ("Carpathian Terror") or "Ceaușescus Rache" ("Ceaușescu's revenge"), due to the numerous technical problems the engines suffered before redesign.

== History ==
The Class 119 was basically a development of the successful Class 118. In the late 1970s the DR needed locomotives with electric train heating, an axle load (Achsfahrmasse) of under 16 t and a power output of over 2,000 horsepower. As a result of the Comecon agreements, the East German economy was not allowed to build diesel locomotives with more than 1,500 horsepower, instead being forced to order those from the Soviet Union.The locomotive builders of the USSR could only supply heavy engines - the Classes 130-132 and 142. The only engine builder, who also wanted to use the "construction kit" (Baukasten) principle was the "23rd August" Locomotive Works, Bucharest, in Romania. The Romanian manufacturer declared itself also ready to install diesel engines produced in East Germany, Johannistal 12KVDs. The installation of such engines did not happen, however, due to supply issues. In order to fulfill the order, the Bucharest factory installed Mercedes-Benz MB820 engines under license from the West German manufacturer, MTU.

The DR procured 200 locomotives from 1976 to 1985. The locomotive drive was, however, plagued by shortcomings and problems from the start. The heat generators had issues, and several quality defects were found. High failure rates meant that 50% of the locomotives were in the workshops at any one time. Damaged locomotives were often used for spare parts rather than repaired themselves. Sometimes two power units were combined in a single locomotive just to make it functional. After 1990, several attempts were made to improve the unreliable locomotives through conversions or modernization, such as the engines being replaced with 1,500 HP East German 12KVDs.

After the merger of the Deutsche Reichsbahn (East Germany) and Deutsche Bundesbahn into Deutsche Bahn in 1994, the 119 was reclassed as the 219. The 229 class was developed when twenty 219s were refurbished by Krupp. Improvements included dual MTU 12V396 engines which increased the speed to 140 km/h. They were used as express passenger locomotives in the east. It was decided that it was less expensive to purchase new trains so only the 20 underwent conversion into the 229, and by 2002 trains from both classes had been removed from front-line service. Twelve locomotives were sent to Romania in 2003 for use by Logistic Center Romania, but they were all retired in 2003 and have since been cut up for scrap.

== Literature ==
- Köhler, Kurt; Stange, Andreas (2004). Die Baureihen 119, 219 und 229 Rumänische Dieselloks für die Deutsche Reichsbahn (in German). Freiburg: EK-Verlag. ISBN 3-88255-129-1.
- Buchner, Mathias, ed. (2002). Die Baureihe 219 - Unterwegs mit den Reichsbahn-"U-Booten" (in German). Eisenbahn-Bildarchiv, EK-Verlag. ISBN 978-3-88255-340-6.
- Schönheit, Walter (2002). "Baureihe 219. Im Führerstand". Lok Magazin (in German). 41 (255). München: GeraNova Zeitschriftenverlag GmbH: 52–55. ISSN 0458-1822.
- Endisch, Dirk (2003). ""U-Boote" tauchen ab. Baureihe 219/229". Lok Magazin (in German). 42 (259). München: GeraNova Zeitschriftenverlag GmbH: 6–9. ISSN 0458-1822.
- "Modernisierung einer Lokomotive der Baureihe 219". Eisenbahn-Revue International (in German). 6: 251–ff. 2001. ISSN 1421-2811.
