= BDŽ class 76 =

Bulgarian diesel locomotive type

Type and origin
- Power type: Diesel-hydraulic
- Builder: FAUR – Bucharest
- Build date: 1976 - 1978
- Total produced: 15
Specifications
- Configuration
  - UIC: B'B'
- Gauge: 760 mm (2 ft 5 15/16 in) Bosnian gauge
- Wheel diameter: 1,000 mm (3 ft 3 3/8 in)
- Length
  - Over couplers: 13,334 mm (43 ft 9.0 in)
- Width: 2,470 mm (8 ft 1 in)
- Height: 3,520 mm (11 ft 7 in)
- Axle load: 13 t (12.8 long tons; 14.3 short tons)
- Loco weight: total: 52 t (51 long tons; 57.5 short tons), empty: 48.5 t (47.5 long tons; 53.5 short tons)
- Transmission: Hydraulic
Performance figures
- Maximum speed: 70 km/h (43 mph)
- Power output: Engines: 1,100 hp (820 kW)
Career
- Operators: BDŽ
- Numbers: 76 001 - 76 015
- Disposition: 1 preserved, 3 sold to Argentina, remainder scrapped

After 1973 the acquisition of additional high-speed diesel locomotives was considered to complement the BDZ park for the Septemvri - Dobrinishte line and especially for the replacement of the steam tram along the line Cherven Bryag - Oryahovo. The acquisition of class 75 locomotives failed for a number of reasons. Thus a construction and supply contract was signed with the Romanian plant "23 August" (now FAUR) - Bucharest. The locomotives were built to the technical conditions of BDZ, reflecting the experience of the already 10 years of operation of the class 75 locomotives.

Initially, a prototype of the locomotive was designated 76-15 (after the test runs the machine had to be returned to the factory for refurbishment when the locomotives 76-01 to 76-14 were already under construction) to be delivered as the last locomotive in the series. The program was implemented and all locomotives were put into operation from May to September 1977, and 76-15 arrived in February 1978.

Initially, all class 76 locomotives were assigned to the Cherven Bryag depot. This replaced the steam traction on the line entirely. Later it was found that their number was bigger than required and five were sent to the Septemvri depot (76-11 to 76-15). Their operation shows, despite the proximity of the technical parameters to those of class 75, that they have lower operating capacities, more failures and lower quality of workmanship. After the cessation of the operation of the Cherven Bryag - Oryahovo and Varvara - Pazardjik lines in 2002, the scrapping of locomotives in the two main narrow-gauge depots (Cherven Bryag and Septemvri) took place and in the park of BDZ four locomotives of class 76 remained. In 2009, BDZ sold 3 of them to Argentina, and one was left for a museum exhibit and was stored in the Septemvri depot.

== Operational and Factory Data for Locomotives ==
Operational number		fabr. No. / year	Notes
delivered	since 1988	fabr. No. / year	Notes
76-01	76 001.7	23141/1977	Scrapped 1996
76-02	76 002.5	23142/1977	Scrapped 2002
76-03	76 003.3	23143/1977	Scrapped 1994
76-04	76 004.1	23144/1977	Scrapped 1994
76-05	76 005.8	23145/1977	Sold to Argentina (YCRT Rail Argentina # 402)
76-06	76 006.6	23146/1977	Sold to Argentina (YCRT Rail Argentina # 403)
76-07	76 007.4	23147/1977	Scrapped 1998
76-08	76 008.2	23148/1977	Scrapped 1998
76-09	76 009.0	23149/1977	Scrapped 1998
76-10	76 010.8	23154/1977	Scrapped 1998
76-11	76 011.6	23151/1977	Designated as a museum exhibit
76-12	76 012.4	23152/1977	Sold to Argentina (YCRT Rail Argentina # 401)
76-13	76 013.2	23153/1977	Scrapped 1996
76-14	76 014.8	23150/1977	Scrapped 2002
76-15	76 015.7	23115/1976	Scrapped 2001

== Sources ==
1. Translated from Локомотиви БДЖ серия 76.000
2. Димитър Деянов, Локомотивното стопанство на БДЖ 1947 – 1990, Sofia, 1993
