= CFR-Class 040 DH =

Romanian locomotive class

CFR Class 040 DH CFR classes 80 and 81 BDŽ class 55
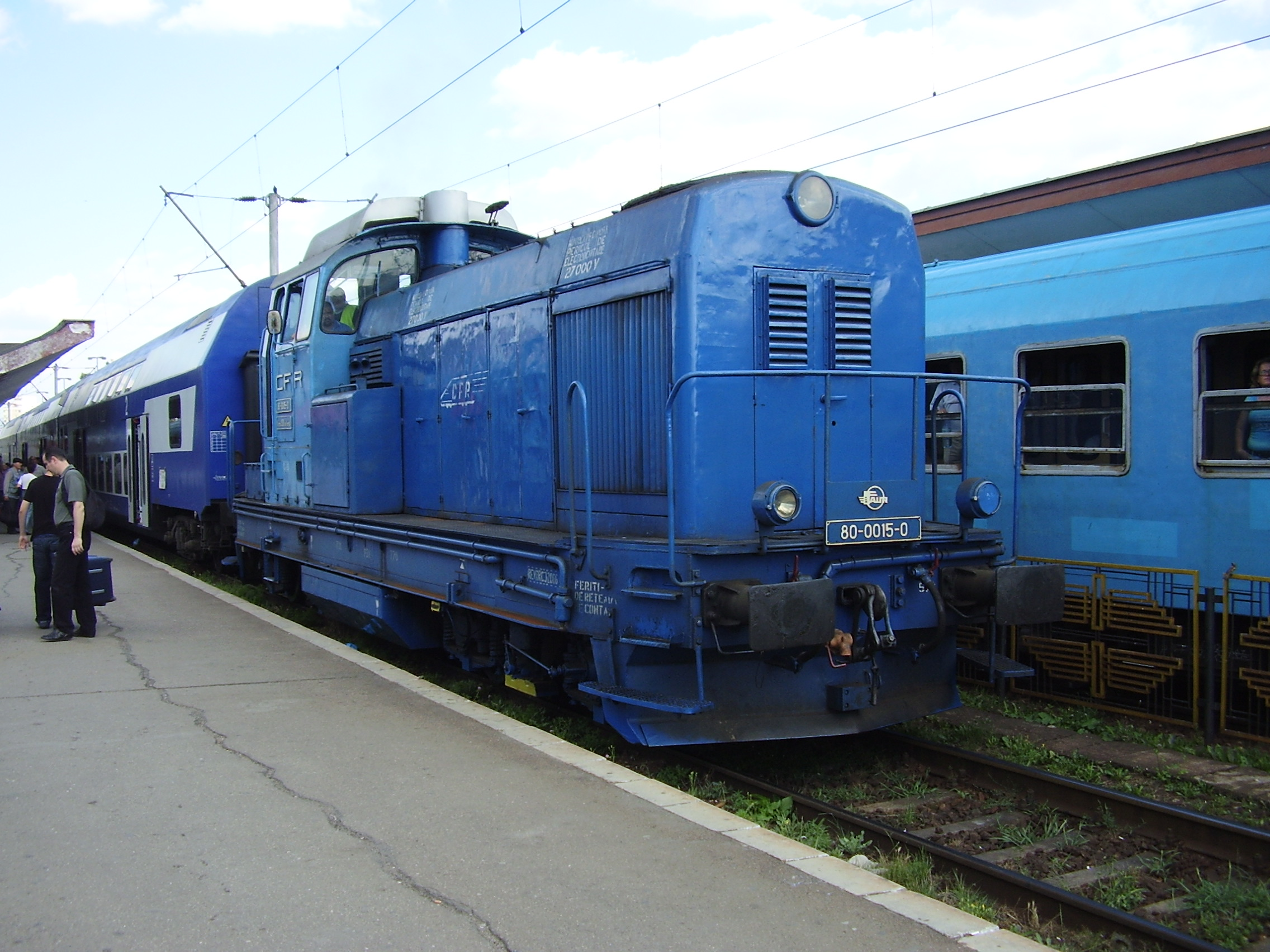
- 80-0015-0 at Gara Braşov, 2005
Type and origin
- Power type: Diesel-hydraulic
- Builder: FAUR (licensed)
- Model: LDH 125
- Build date: 1968-1976
- Total produced: 633 (Romania); 263 (Bulgaria)
Specifications
- Configuration
  - UIC: B'B'
  - Commonwealth: B-B
- Gauge: 1,435 mm (4 ft 8 1/2 in); 1,524 mm (5 ft)
- Wheel diameter: 1,000 mm (3 ft 3 in)
- Minimum curve: 7,200 mm (23 ft 7 in)
- Wheelbase: 9,700 mm (31 ft 10 in)
  - Bogie: 2,500 mm (8 ft 2 in)
- Length
  - Over buffers: 13,700 mm (44 ft 11 in)
- Height: 4,650 mm (15 ft 3 in)
- Axle load: 18 t (18 long tons; 20 short tons)
- Service weight: 70 t (69 long tons; 77 short tons)
- Prime mover: Sulzer Type 6 LDA 28
- RPM range: 750 rpm (12.5 Hz)
- Traction motors: 6
- Train heating: Steam, later electric (some units)
- Loco brake: Air; Knorr
Performance figures
- Maximum speed: 60 km/h (37 mph) or 100 km/h (62 mph)
- Power output: 920 kW (1,230 hp)
- Tractive effort
  - Starting: 225 kN (51,000 lbf)
Career
- Numbers: CFR 040 DH: 001-633; CFR class 80/81: 0001-0633; BDŽ class 55: 001-263

CFR Class 040 DH (Factory designation LDH 125) are diesel-hydraulic locomotives produced in large numbers for shunting and light mainline service by the Romanian state railways CFR. In addition, 475 locomotives of this model were delivered to Romanian industrial companies, 263 units were delivered to Bulgaria, 42 units were delivered to industrial companies in Czechoslovakia, three units went to Iraq, two units went to China and one unit was delivered to USSR.

== History ==
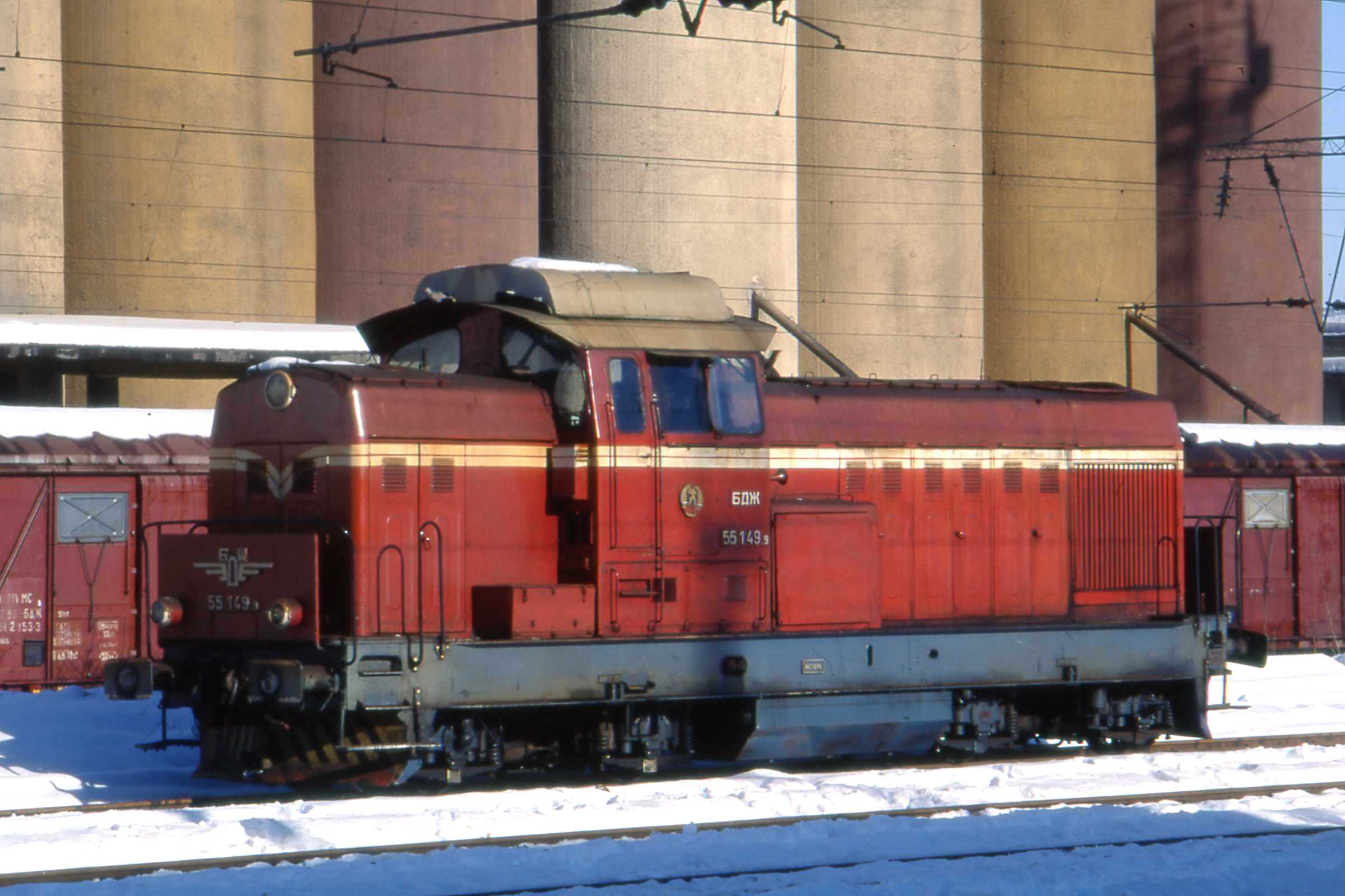
View of LDH 125 as BDZ Series 55

In order to replace the steam locomotives used in heavy shunting and service on branch lines, the CFR bought large numbers of these locomotives. These locomotives are very similar to the SBB Bm 4/4 in the design of the trucks and the sub-frames. The entire locomotive was created after an implementation project at Sulzer AG, the then Bukarester Lokomotivwerke 23. August started production. Production in Bucharest was made possible because the Romanian locomotive works had licenses for the production of the necessary hydraulic machinery. This locomotive became famous in Germany because one of the first examples produced was exhibited at the Leipziger Messe in 1968. Some of the locomotives were equipped with steam heating due to their intended use. These locomotives were later given the designation 80. The vehicles without train heating were classified as Class 81. Locomotives delivered to Bulgaria were given the designation BDŽ Class 55s.

Locomotive types LDH 45 and LDH 70 are similar in structure, but with different engine power and size. Some of the LDH 125 locomotives were also built in broad-gauge. Another variant of the LDH 125 was the LDE 125 series, units of which were built from 1977 with the same design but using diesel-electric transmission. Of this variant, which required a slightly larger superstructure on the same undercarriage to accommodate the more voluminous diesel electrics, 110 copies were made for Romanian industrial companies and a few copies for export to Poland and Brazil. This design can be recognized by the missing sliding platforms on the front sides.

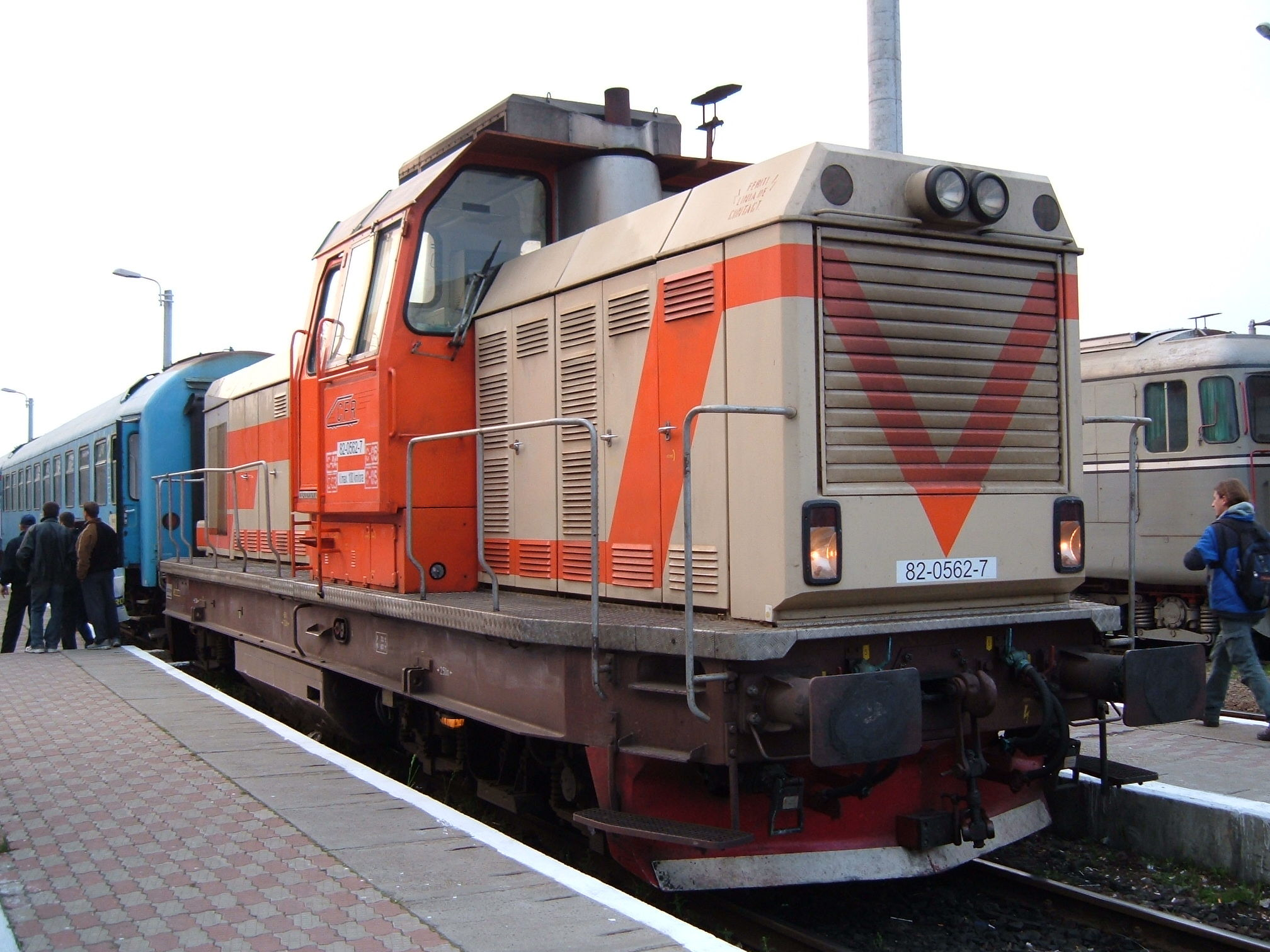
View of a converted CFR Class 82 locomotive

The locomotives were used in marshalling yards and on industrial railways on a variety of routes with medium transport needs and along steeply-graded routes, where they replaced numerous steam locomotives there, especially the CFR series 230 and the CFR series 50. They were the epitome of passenger travel, used for example on the Brașov–Zărnești railway line with four double-decker coaches. There have been several changes to the units over the years. Remarul converted 25 locomotives to have electric train heating. These were given the designation 89.

Further modifications involved a renewal of the mechanical systems. For example, Alstom offered a conversion variant in which the old Sulzer diesel engines were replaced with newer units using the same hydrodynamic power transmission. Locomotives with engines from Caterpillar were re-designated as Class 82 and locomotives with engines from MTU were designated as Class 83. They also received an electric train heating system with an auxiliary diesel engine. As these conversion measures proved their worth, other vehicles were converted at Remarul and given the Class 82 designation. A complete redesign of the locomotives happened in 2005 at Remarul with the Series 84, having similar changes to the locomotive engines but with modified angular carbodies.

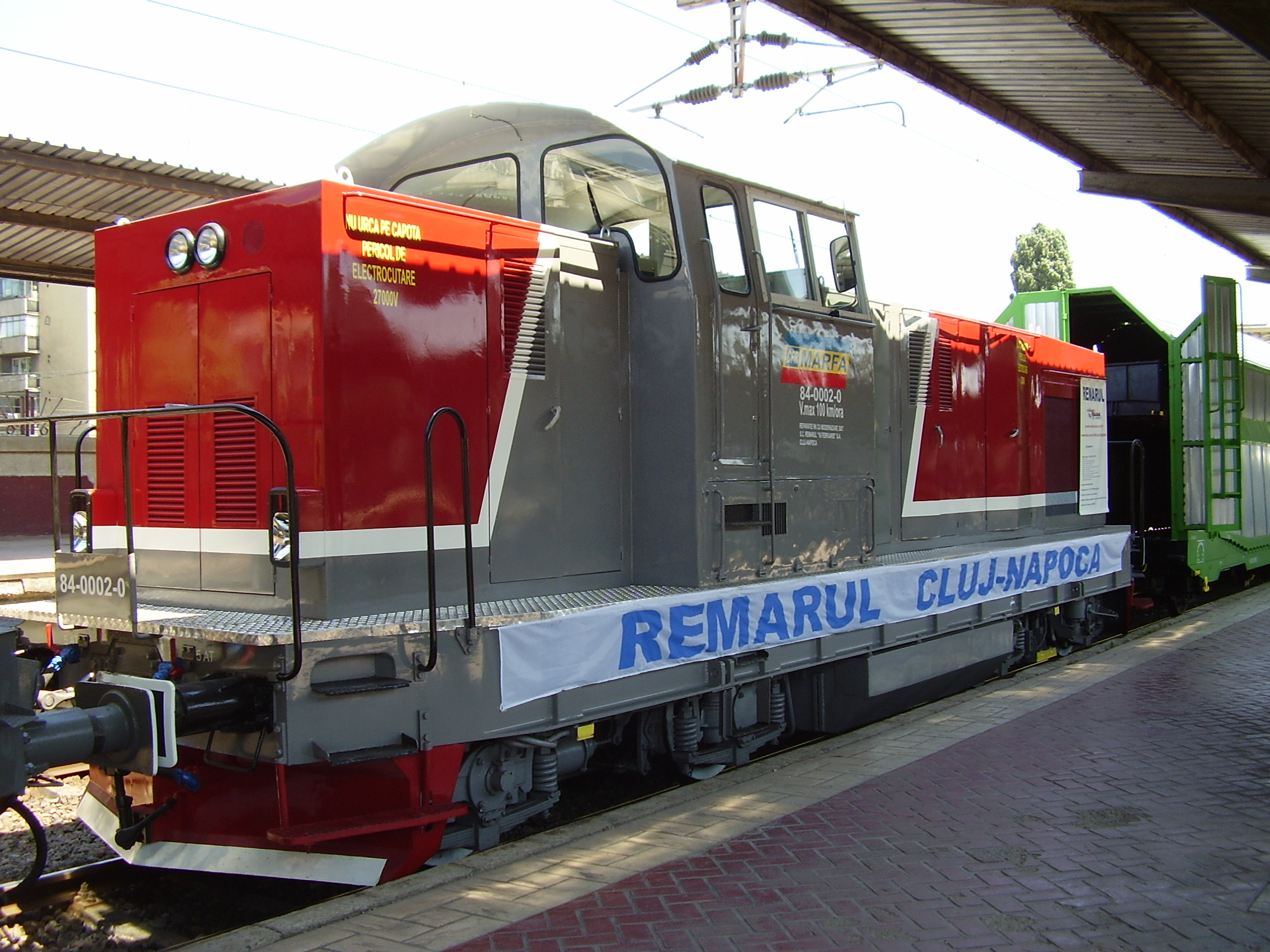
Photograph of a converted Class 84 locomotive

The non-modernized locomotives have now been put out to tender for sale to third parties in Romania and Bulgaria.

== Technical Details ==
The locomotive is equipped with two hoods of different lengths and an off-center driver's cab that extends over the entire width of the chassis. The units housed the diesel engine in the front end and the steam heater (or the electric train heater) and the battery in the rear. The hydraulic gearbox is also housed in the front hood and extends below the cab floor.

The locomotives are equipped with a conventional coupling system. The trucks are guided by pivot pins on the frame. The wheel sets are mounted on the roller bearings via guide pins on the trucks The guide pins are located in two sockets in the axle box. The trucks are cushioned using a combination of coil and leaf springs.

The 6 LDA 28 is a six-cylinder, four-stroke diesel engine, which developed 920 kW (1230 hp) at 750 rpm, was originally used as the drive system. It was supercharged and intercooled. In addition to the usual air filters, it also had an intake silencer. An exhaust silencer reduced the engine noise. The motor drives the hydraulic transmission via a flexible coupling, licensed from Voith in St. Pölten. This transmission, which consists of two converters, shifts automatically depending on the engine torque and speed. Downstream of the fluid transmission was a secondary gearbox for speeds of 60 km/h using the shunting gears and for speeds of 100 km/h in the road gears. The reversing gear was flanged after the gearbox. The inner wheel sets of the locomotive trucks were driven via cardan shafts, with the outer wheel sets propelled using through drives.

An alternator or battery powered the on-board network in each unit at 110 volts. A cooling unit was attached to the leading edge of the large front hood on each locomotive, with 8 cooling elements on each side. A hydrostatically driven fan chilled the cooling water. Engine lubricating oil and gear oil were chilled using heat exchangers. Originally, locomotives for passenger train service were equipped with an oil-fired boiler, but were later upgraded with an electric heating system. Locomotives used for shunting service had ballast installed at this location instead.
