= BDŽ class 75 =

Type of train

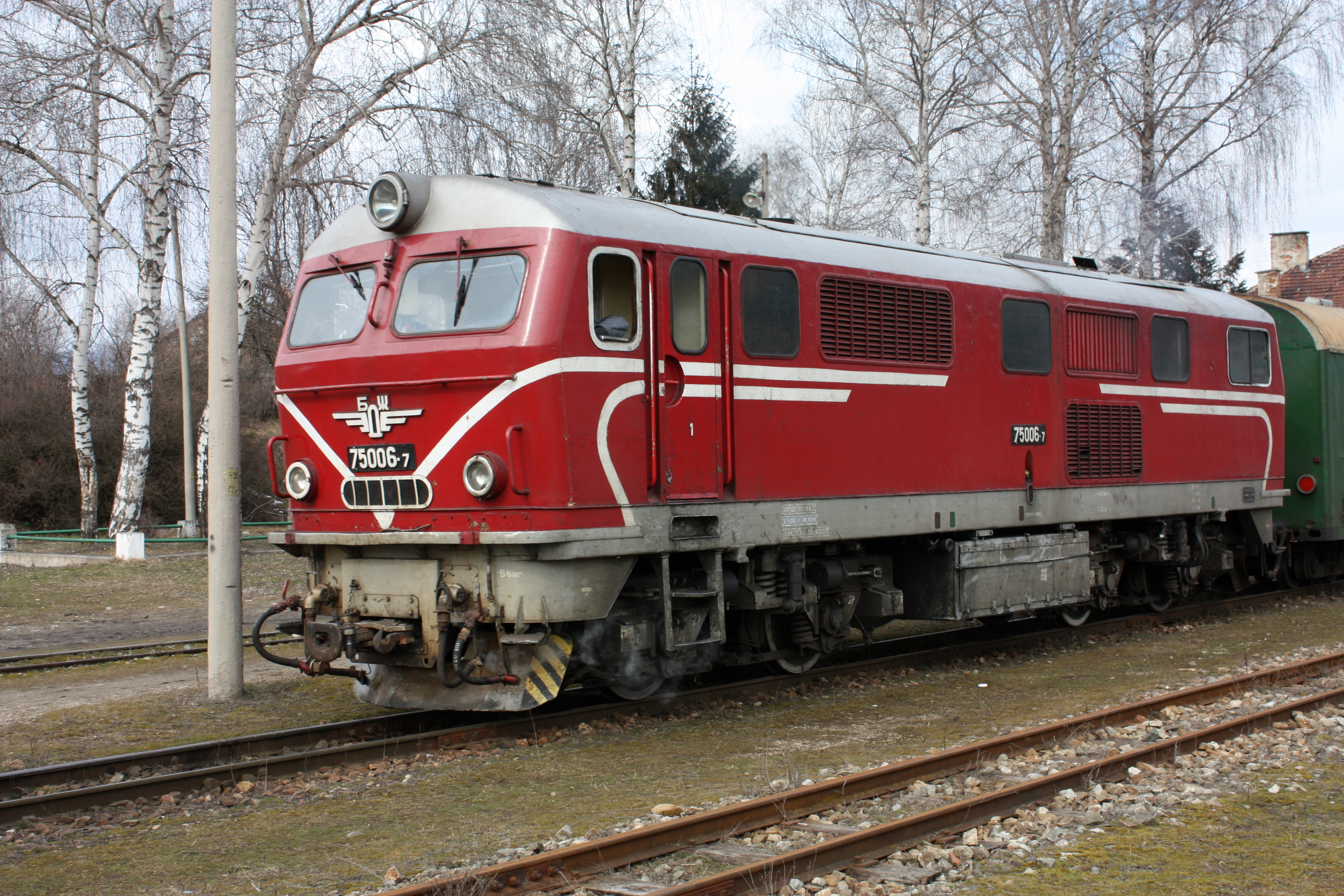
- BDŽ class 75 006-7 at Belitsa station
Type and origin
- Power type: Diesel-hydraulic
- Builder: Henschel – Kassel
- Build date: 1965
- Total produced: 10
Specifications
- Configuration
  - UIC: B'B'
- Gauge: 760 mm (2 ft 5 15/16 in) Bosnian gauge
- Wheel diameter: 900 mm (2 ft 11 7/16 in)
- Minimum curve: 40 m (130 ft)
- Wheelbase: 8,400 mm (27 ft 7 in)
  - Bogie: 1,900 mm (6 ft 3 in)
- Pivot centres: 6,500 mm (21 ft 4 in)
- Length
  - Over couplers: 13,040 mm (42 ft 9 in)
- Width: 2,470 mm (8 ft 1 in)
- Height: 3,520 mm (11 ft 7 in)
- Axle load: 12 t (11.8 long tons; 13.2 short tons)
- Loco weight: Total: 48 t (47 long tons; 53 short tons), Empty: 44.5 t (44 long tons; 49 short tons)
- Fuel capacity: 1,800 L (400 imp gal; 480 US gal)
- Prime mover: Maybach Mb 820 Bb four-stroke Diesel engine
- RPM range: 1,500 rpm^{−1} (nominal)
- Cylinders: 12
- Transmission: Hydraulic
Performance figures
- Maximum speed: 70 km/h (43 mph)
- Power output: Engines: 1,100 hp (820 kW)
- Tractive effort: 147 kN (33,000 lbf)
Career
- Operators: BDŽ
- Numbers: 75 001 - 75 010
- Disposition: 7 preserved, remainder scrapped

The BDŽ class 75 is a series of Bulgarian narrow-gauge diesel-hydraulic locomotives.

The first 760 mm track-side diesel locomotives of the BDŽ were built by the German company Henschel & Sohn of Kassel, and were put into operation in Bulgaria in the beginning of 1966. As soon as they arrived, they became the main narrow-gauge locomotive series at the Septemvri depot, took the passenger (from the series 81 and 82) and the freight (from the 600.76 series locomotives) service on the railway lines Septemvri - Dobrinishte and Varvara - Pazardzhik. Moreover, due to the higher power of the locomotives, the trip from Septemvri to Dobrinishte was shortened by more than 1 hour.

The locomotives were constructed under the technical conditions of BDŽ and consisted mainly of: a diesel engine with a power of 1100 hp, a hydraulic gear and the wheelset formula is B'B'. When built in the 1960s, they were the most powerful 760 mm gauge diesel locomotives in the world. They were also the first time Bulgarian locomotives used the cavities in the main locomotive frame for fuel storage.

The first locomotive to be scrapped was 75 007.5, which derailed on January 16, 1991 due to a broken track on the open line to "Dryanov Dol". The damage could have been repaired, but due to a locomotive surplus it was made into a spare parts "donor" for the other locomotives and was eventually scrapped in 1994.

== Factory data and status ==
In Operation
Withdrawn; written off or scrapped
In repair
Sold

Operational number			Factory №/ year	Notes
Delivered as	Since 1988	Since 2012	Factory №/ year	Notes
75 – 01	75 001.8		31133/1965	
75 – 02	75 002.6		31134/1965	Withdrawn
75 – 03	75 003.4	–	31135/1965	Written off in 2004
75 – 04	75 004.2	92 52 0675 004-2	31136/1965	
75 – 05	75 005.9	92 52 0675 005-9	31137/1965	
75 – 06	75 006.7	92 52 0675 006-7	31138/1965	
75 – 07	75 007.5	–	31139/1965	Written off in 1994
75 – 08	75 008.3	92 52 0675 008-3	31140/1965	
75 – 09	75 009.1	92 52 0675 009-1	31141/1965	
75 – 10	75 010.9		31142/1965	
