= FAUR =

Romanian company

FAUR S.A.
- Type: Public: (BVB: FAU)
- Industry: Railroad; Power Generation
- Predecessor: MALAXA; 23 August Works
- Founded: 1921
- Founder: Nicolae Malaxa
- Headquarters: Bucharest, Romania
- Products: Locomotives; Diesel engines OEM parts
- Services: Locomotive maintenance Locomotive management Training
- Parent: Bega Group
- Website: faur.ro

FAUR S.A. is an industrial engineering and manufacturing company based in Bucharest, Romania.

== History ==
FAUR was founded by Nicolae Malaxa in 1921 under the name MALAXA. Main activities were the repairing of rolling stock, manufacturing steam locomotives, diesel locomotives, car-engines and passenger coaches, diesel engines, brake equipment, and special alloy steels. By the end of the 1930s, the Malaxa factories were one of the biggest industrial group in Southeastern Europe, and the main provider of equipment for the Romanian Railways during the period.

Nationalised in 1948, part of the company became known as 23 August Works, referring to the 1944 Romanian coup d'état. During Communist Romania it extended its range of manufacturing by approaching pilot projects to the most Romanian industries but also to other countries in Europe, Asia and Africa.

From 1976 to 1985, 200 DR Class 119 engines were built for Deutsche Reichsbahn (East Germany), as a result of the 1970s Comecon (Council for Mutual Economic Assistance) agreements. The East German economy was not allowed anymore to build diesel locomotives with more than 1,500 horsepower, and the locomotive builders of the Soviet Union could only supply engines that were too heavy for some lines in East Germany, limited to an axle load (Achsfahrmasse) of under 16 t. Yet, a power output of over 2,000 horsepower was needed. Literally Design by committee, the 119 was built in Romania according to a "construction kit" (Baukasten) principle. East German diesel engines should have been used, but due to coordination problems in East Germany's national planning commission, the Bucharest factory installed engines under licence from the West German manufacturer, MTU. Other countries in Comecon also received subcontractor orders. East Germany itself supplied inter alia hydrodynamic transmissions and axle motors. The locomotive drive was, however, plagued by shortcomings and problems from the start. In its early days, 50% of the locomotives were in the workshops at any one time. As a result, only 200 engines were built, not 250 or more as intended.

In 1990, the company was renamed FAUR and privatized.

Since 2004, FAUR is part of Bega Group.

== Steam locomotives ==
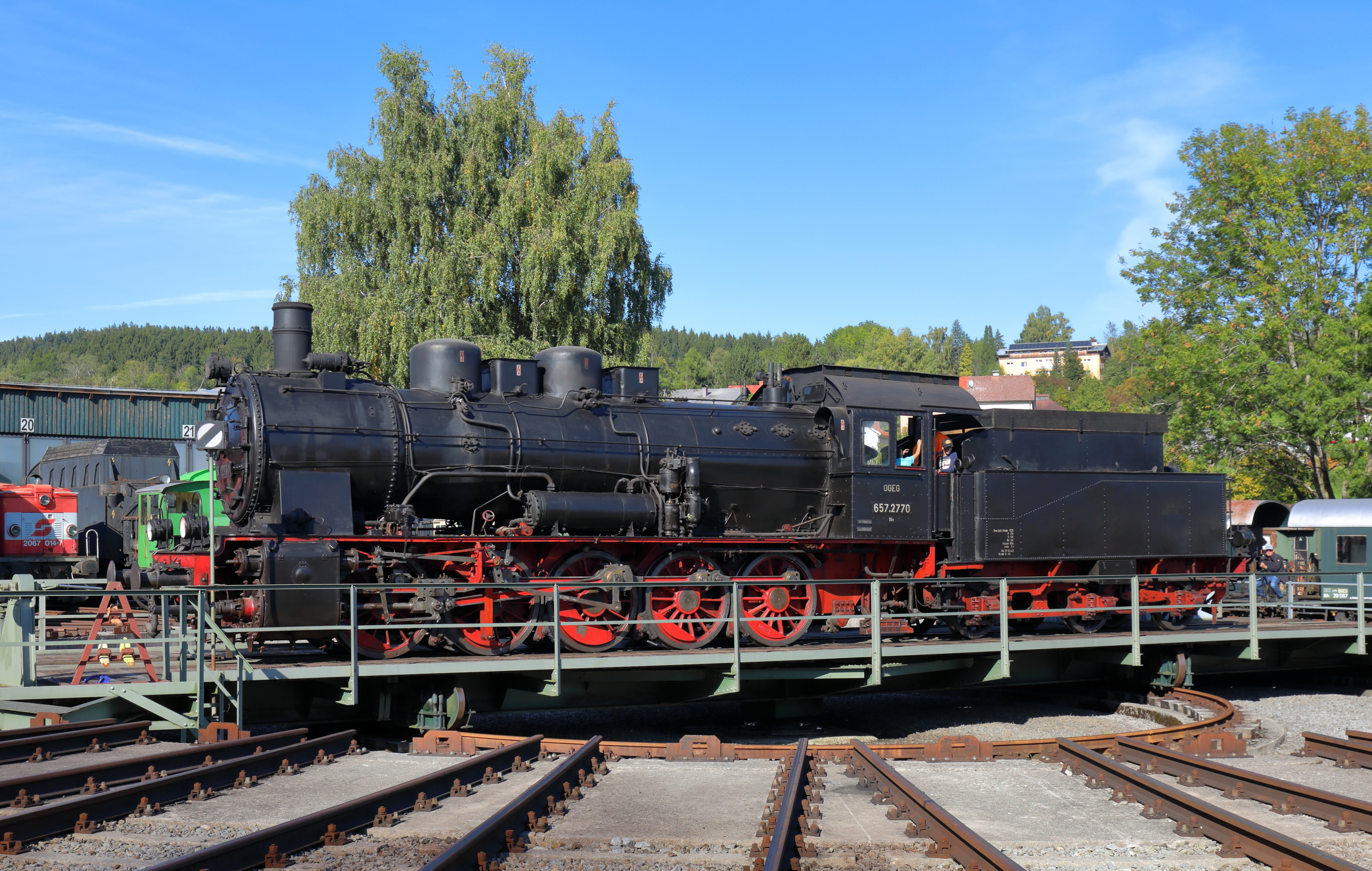
Steam locomotive 50.770; factory number 299, construction year 1938

Since 1920, the design and the construction of different types of railway engines began at the Domains Factories (nowadays UMC Reșița) in Reșița and Malaxa Factories in Bucharest. Due to the success of the construction of the railway engines in Reșița and Bucharest factories, Romania ceased importing railway locomotives starting with 1930. Between 1926 and 1960, a total number of 1,207 steam locomotives were built in Romania: 10 models for standard tracks and 3 models for the narrow gauge railways. From these, 797 steam locomotives were made in Reșița Factories and 410 at Malaxa Factories. In 1960 the production of steam locomotives was ceased, the Romanian industry focusing on fabrication of the diesel railway engines.

== Diesel-electric and diesel-hydraulic locomotives ==
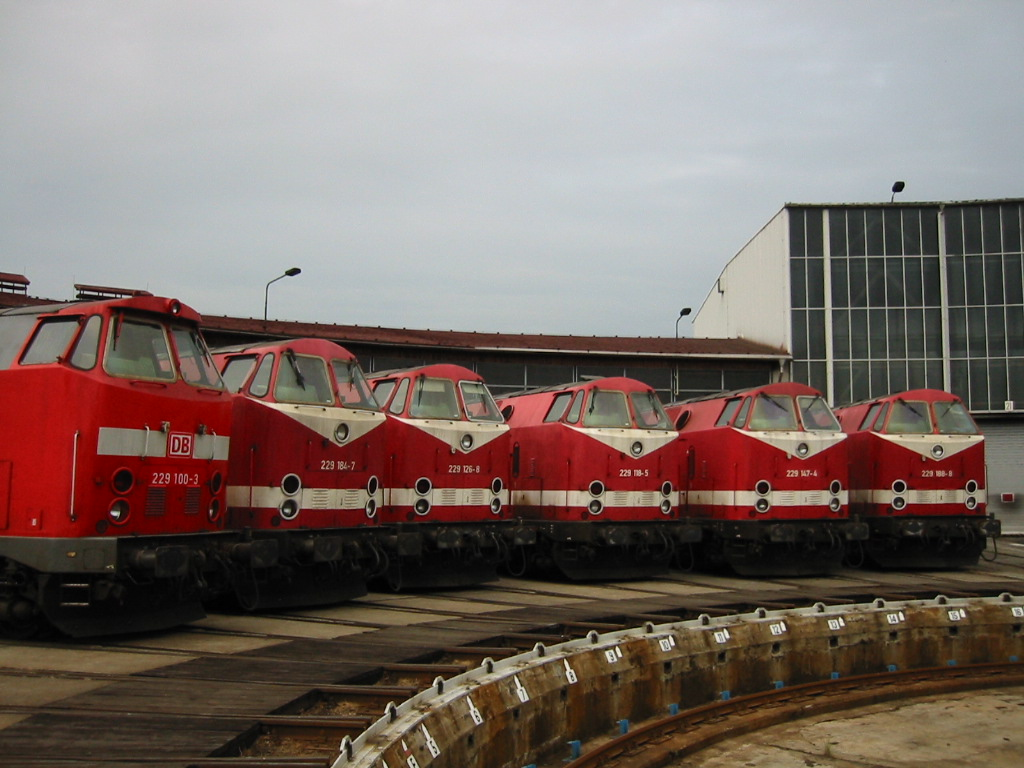
DR Class 119 (later 219) engines produced 1976–1985 for East Germany, later used by Deutsche Bahn

- List of FAUR locomotives

== See also ==
- Malaxa car
- Căile Ferate Române, Romanian Railways
- Mareșal tank destroyer
- Renault UE Chenillette
