= List of railway lines in Bulgaria =

A map of railway infrastructure in Bulgaria

This is a list of railway lines in Bulgaria focusing primarily on intercity train lines. In 2019, there were 4,071 kilometres (2,530 mi) of standard gauge railways, of which 67% were electrified. Narrow gauge lines amount to 125 kilometres (78 mi).

Train railways, as well as related infrastructure such as stations, are managed and maintained by the National Railway Infrastructure Company, which split from Bulgarian State Railways (BDZ) - Bulgaria's national rail company - in 2002. The National Railway Infrastructure Company holds a virtual monopoly on ownership and works closely with the State Railways.

Non-train rail transport in Bulgaria is limited to tram and metro services in Sofia, both managed by their own municipality-owned companies.

== Active lines ==
Bolded indicates main lines. Italics indicate narrow-gauge lines.

Name	Route	Length	Gauge	Electrified	Usage
**BDZ Line 1**	Kalotina – Sofia – Plovdiv – Svilengrad	356 km (221 mi)	Standard	Yes	Freight & passenger
**BDZ Line 2**	Sofia – Mezdra – Gorna Oryahovitsa – Kaspichan – Varna	544 km (338 mi)	Standard	Yes	Freight & passenger
**BDZ Line 3**	Iliyantsi – Tulovo – Dabovo – Zimnitsa – Karnobat – Sindel – Varna (ferry)	541 km (336 mi)	Standard	Yes	Freight & passenger
**BDZ Line 4**	Ruse – Gorna Oryahovitsa – Dabovo – Tulovo – Stara Zagora – Mihaylovo – Podkova	415 km (258 mi)	Standard	Yes	Freight & passenger
**BDZ Line 5**	Sofia – Pernik – Radomir – Kulata	209 km (130 mi)	Standard	Yes	Freight & passenger
**BDZ Line 6**	Voluyak – Pernik – Gyueshevo	134 km (83 mi)	Standard	Yes	Freight & passenger
**BDZ Line 7**	Mezdra – Boychinovtsi – Brusartsi – Vidin	181 km (112 mi)	Standard	Yes	Freight & passenger
**BDZ Line 8**	Plovdiv – Stara Zagora – Yambol – Karnobat – Burgas	293 km (182 mi)	Standard	Yes	Freight & passenger
**BDZ Line 9**	Ruse – Samuil – Kaspichan	137 km (85 mi)	Standard	Yes	Freight & passenger
BDZ Line 11	Kalotina – Stanyantsi	16 km (10 mi)	Standard	No	Freight only
BDZ Line 13	Sofia – Voluyak – Bankya	11 km (7 mi)	Standard	No	Passenger only
BDZ Line 16	Septemvri – Dobrinishte	125 km (78 mi)	**Narrow**	No	Passenger only
BDZ Line 18	Stamboliyski – Peshtera	28 km (17 mi)	Standard	No	Passenger only
BDZ Line 19	Krumovo – Asenovgrad	10 km (6 mi)	Standard	Yes	Passenger only
BDZ Line 23	Yasen – Cherkovitsa	43 km (27 mi)	Standard	No	Passenger only
BDZ Line 24	Svishtov – Levski – Troyan	130 km (81 mi)	Standard	No	Passenger only
BDZ Line 27	Shumen – Komunari	50 km (31 mi)	Standard	Yes	Passenger only
BDZ Line 28	Povelyanovo – Kardam	109 km (68 mi)	Standard	Partially	Freight & passenger
BDZ Line 42	Tsareva Livada – Gabrovo	17 km (11 mi)	Standard	Yes	Passenger only
BDZ Line 51	Dupnitsa – Bobov Dol	19 km (12 mi)	Standard	Yes	Freight only
BDZ Line 52	General Todorov – Petrich	9 km (6 mi)	Standard	Yes	Passenger only
BDZ Line 71	Boychinovtsi – Berkovitsa	38 km (24 mi)	Standard	Yes	Passenger only
BDZ Line 72	Brusartsi – Lom	23 km (14 mi)	Standard	Yes	Passenger only
BDZ Line 73	Vidin – Koshava	28 km (17 mi)	Standard	Partially	Freight only
BDZ Line 81	Filipovo – Panagyurishte	71 km (44 mi)	Standard	No	Freight & passenger
BDZ Line 82	Filipovo – Dolna Mahala – Karlovo	65 km (40 mi)	Standard	Yes	Freight & passenger
BDZ Line 82.1	Dolna Mahala – Hisarya	15 km (9 mi)	Standard	Yes	Passenger only
BDZ Line 83	Simeonovgrad – Nova Zagora	111 km (69 mi)	Standard	Ongoing	Freight & passenger
BDZ Line 91	Samuil – Silistra	113 km (70 mi)	Standard	No	Passenger only

== Urban rail transport ==
The capital Sofia is the only Bulgarian city with an urban rail network. These include trams and subway trains. Until 1964, a ring railway connected a number of train stations within Sofia. This abandoned railway has seen renewed interest in 2019, with proposals to either partially restore and use it for connections to Sofia Airport and subway stations, convert it into a "green ring route" for bicycles, or both. In May 2020, it was decided that parts of this railway will not be restored for train movement, but for bicycles and pedestrians instead.

Sofia's urban rail network is nevertheless integrated with the national railway network. Both the tram network and Sofia Metro have stations at Sofia Central Station, the central hub for several of the main train lines in Bulgaria.

=== Trams ===
Operational since 1901, the tram network had 137 kilometres (85 mi) of track in 2016, servicing 14 lines with a total two-way route length of 286 kilometres (178 mi). The Sofiya tram network uses two gauges - 1009 mm (39,72 inches) and standard 1435 mm (56,49 inches).

1	Ivan Vazov quarter - National Palace of Culture - Macedonia Sq. - Central station - Kn. M. Luiza Metro Station
3	Zaharna Fabrika - Konstantin Velichkov Metro Station - Central station - Orlandovtsi
4	Nikola Petkov - Macedonia Sq. - Central station - Orlandovtsi
5	Knyazhevo - Krasno selo - Macedonia Sq. - Sofia Court House
6	Ivan Vazov - National Palace of Culture - Macedonia Sq. - Central station - Beli Dunav Metro Station - Obelya
7	Borovo - NDK - Macedonia Sq. - Central station - Han Kubrat Metro Station
8	Lyulin-5 - Vardar Metro Station - Macedonia Sq. - Sofia Court House
10	Zapaden Park - Macedonia Sq. - Srebarna Str. - Vitosha Metro Station
11	Knyazhevo quarter - Konstantin Velichkov Metro Station - Iliyantsi
12	Iliyantsi - Central station - St. Nedelya sq. - Journalist sq.
18	Orlandovtsi - St. Nedelya sq. - Journalist sq.
20	Iskar tramway Depot - Poduyane railway station - Central Sofia Market Hall - Opalchenska Metro Station
22	East station - Poduyane railway station - Konstantin Velichkov Metro Station - Krasna polyana Depot
23	Geo Milev - Iskarsko Shose Blvd. - Obikolna Street
1,009 mm (3 ft 3 23/32 in) metre gauge (nominally) 1,435 mm (4 ft 8 1/2 in) standard gauge

=== Metro ===
The only subway system in operation is also located in Sofia. It was unveiled in 1998 and has four lines with a total length of 52 km 32 mi and 47 stations. metropolitan.bg web site

== See also ==
- Highways in Bulgaria
