= T8M-301 Bulgaria 1300 =

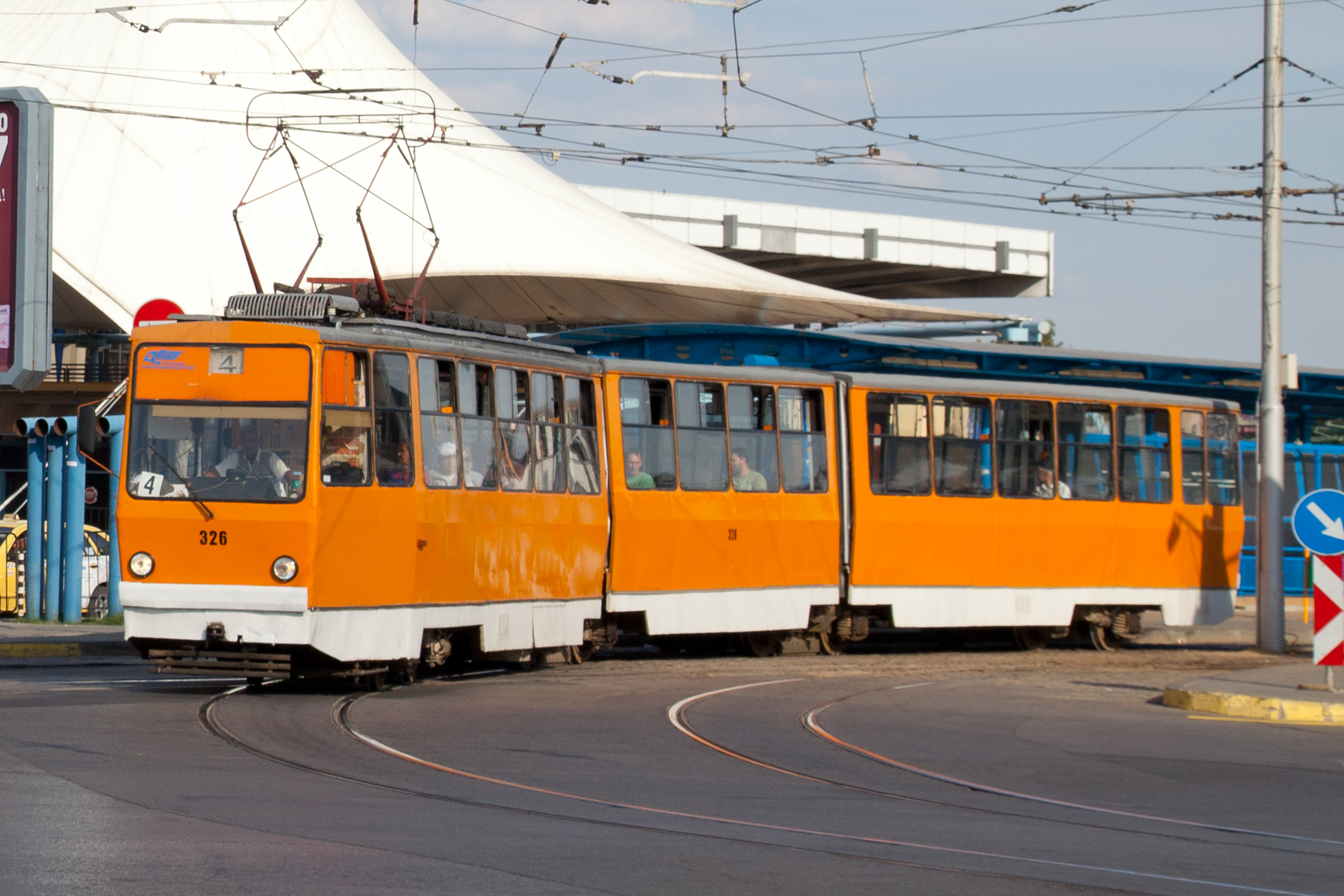
- In service: 1981–2013
- Manufacturer: Tramkar
- Constructed: 1981–1989
- Number built: 25
- Successor: T8M-900
- Operators: Sofia

Specifications
- Width: 2000 mm
- Height: 3140 mm
- Low-floor: no
- Weight: 30 t
- Track gauge: 1,009 mm

T8M-301 Bulgaria 1300 is a tram manufactured by the Bulgarian company Tramkar in Sofia from 1981 until 1989.

The model is also known as Class T8M300. It is called Bulgaria 1300 because it is released in 1981, exactly 1300 years after the establishment of the First Bulgarian Empire. It is known for its loud engines.
