= Lyulin Metro Station =

Sofia metro station

Lyulin Люлин
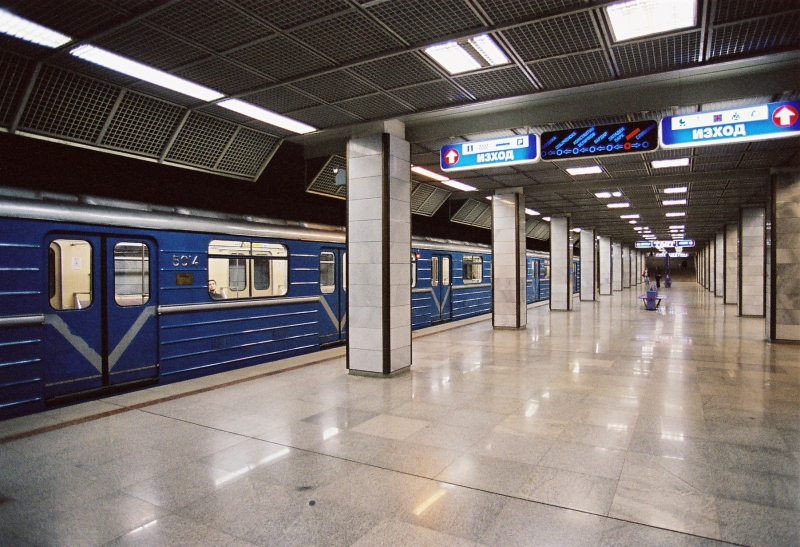

General information
- Location: 1324 Lyulin 7, Sofia
- Coordinates: 42°43′05″N 23°15′28″E
- Owner: Sofia Municipality
- Operator: Metropoliten JSC
- Platforms: island
- Tracks: 2
- Bus routes: 4
- Connections
- Tram: 8
- Bus: 42, 108, 111, N1

Construction
- Structure type: sub-surface
- Platform levels: 2
- Parking: no
- Cycle facilities: no
- Accessible: an elevator to platforms
- Architect: K. Bochkov and B. Sedmakov

Other information
- Status: Staffed
- Station code: 3003; 3004
- Website: Official website

History
- Opened: 28 January 1998

Passengers
- 2020: 520,000

Services
Preceding station	Sofia Metro	Following station
Slivnitsa Terminus	M1 line	Zapaden Park towards Business Park Sofia
Slivnitsa Terminus	M4 line	Zapaden Park towards Sofia Airport
Location

Lyulin Metro Station (Bulgarian: Метростанция "Люлин") is a station on the Sofia Metro in Bulgaria. It opened on 28 January 1998. The station is serving the Lyulin housing estate.

== Interchange with other public transport ==
- Tramway service: 8
- City Bus service: 108, 111, N1
- Suburban Bus service: 42
