= Russian Monument =

Russian Monument may refer to:

- Russian Monument, Sofia, Bulgaria
- Russian Monument (Liechtenstein)
