= Zapaden Park Metro Station =

Sofia metro station

Zapaden Park Западен парк
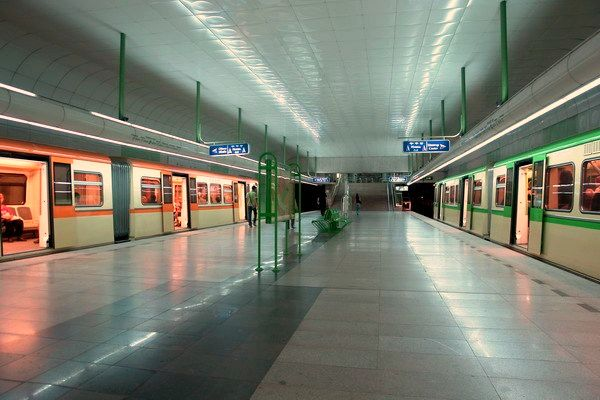

General information
- Location: 1335 Lyulin 10, Sofia
- Coordinates: 42°42′40″N 23°16′15″E
- Owner: Sofia Municipality
- Operator: Metropoliten JSC
- Platforms: island
- Tracks: 2
- Bus routes: 2
- Connections
- Tram: 8
- Bus: 310, N1

Construction
- Structure type: sub-surface
- Platform levels: 2
- Parking: no
- Cycle facilities: no
- Accessible: an elevator to platforms
- Architect: Detelin Mushev

Other information
- Status: Staffed
- Station code: 3005; 3006
- Website: Official website

History
- Opened: 28 January 1998

Passengers
- 2020: 220,000

Services
Preceding station	Sofia Metro	Following station
Lyulin towards Slivnitsa	M1 line	Vardar towards Business Park Sofia
Lyulin towards Slivnitsa	M4 line	Vardar towards Sofia Airport
Location

Zapaden Park Metro station (Bulgarian: Метростанция "Западен парк") is a station on the Sofia Metro in Bulgaria. It opened on 28 January 1998.

== Interchange with other public transport ==
- Tramway service: 8
- City Bus service: 310, N1
