= Vardar Metro Station =

Sofia metro station

Vardar Вардар
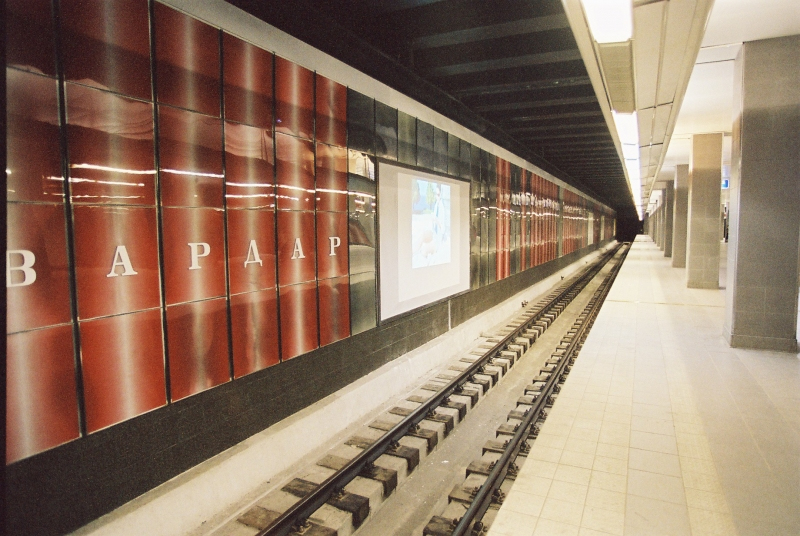

General information
- Location: 1309 Ilinden, Sofia
- Coordinates: 42°42′21″N 23°17′06″E
- Owner: Sofia Municipality
- Operator: Metropoliten JSC
- Platforms: island
- Tracks: 2
- Bus routes: 4
- Connections
- Tram: 8
- Bus: 45, 56, 77, N1

Construction
- Structure type: sub-surface
- Platform levels: 2
- Parking: no
- Cycle facilities: no
- Accessible: an elevator to platforms
- Architect: Dimitar Kazakov

Other information
- Status: Staffed
- Station code: 3007; 3008
- Website: Official website

History
- Opened: 28 January 1998

Passengers
- 2020: 205,000

Services
Preceding station	Sofia Metro	Following station
Zapaden Park towards Slivnitsa	M1 line	Konstantin Velichkov towards Business Park Sofia
Zapaden Park towards Slivnitsa	M4 line	Konstantin Velichkov towards Sofia Airport
Location

Vardar Metro Station (Bulgarian: Метростанция „Вардар“) is a station on the Sofia Metro in Bulgaria. It opened on 28 January 1998.

== Interchange with other public transport ==
- Tramway service: 8
- City Bus service: 45, 77, N1
- Suburban Bus service: 56
