= Konstantin Velichkov =

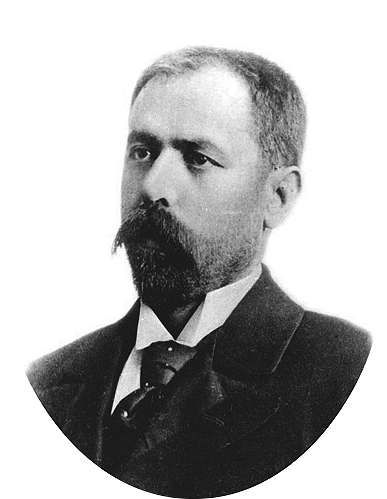
- Born: 1855; Tatar Pazardzhik, Ottoman Empire (now Pazardzhik, Bulgaria)
- Died: November 3, 1907 (aged 52); Grenoble, France

Konstantin Velichkov (full name Konstantin Velichkov Petkov; in Bulgarian: Констaнтин Величков; 1855 – 3 November 1907) was a Bulgarian writer and public figure.

== Biography ==
He was born in the town of Pazardzhik.

Velichkov received his education in the Galatasaray High School in Istanbul where he studied from 1868 to 1874. After returning to his home town he became a teacher in geography, history, French and Bulgarian as well as chairman of the local Chitalishte (reading club). Pretty soon, he became an active member of the local revolutionary committee aiming at liberating Bulgaria from Ottoman domination. Together with Todor Kableshkov, he participated in the preparations for the April uprising. After the failure of the insurgents, Velichkov was arrested and sentenced to death by the Ottoman authorities. Before the sentence could take place, he was let free thanks to the committee sent by European powers to investigate the Turkish atrocities during the suppression of the rebellion. Subsequently, Velichkov worked for the Bulgarian Exarchate until 1877.

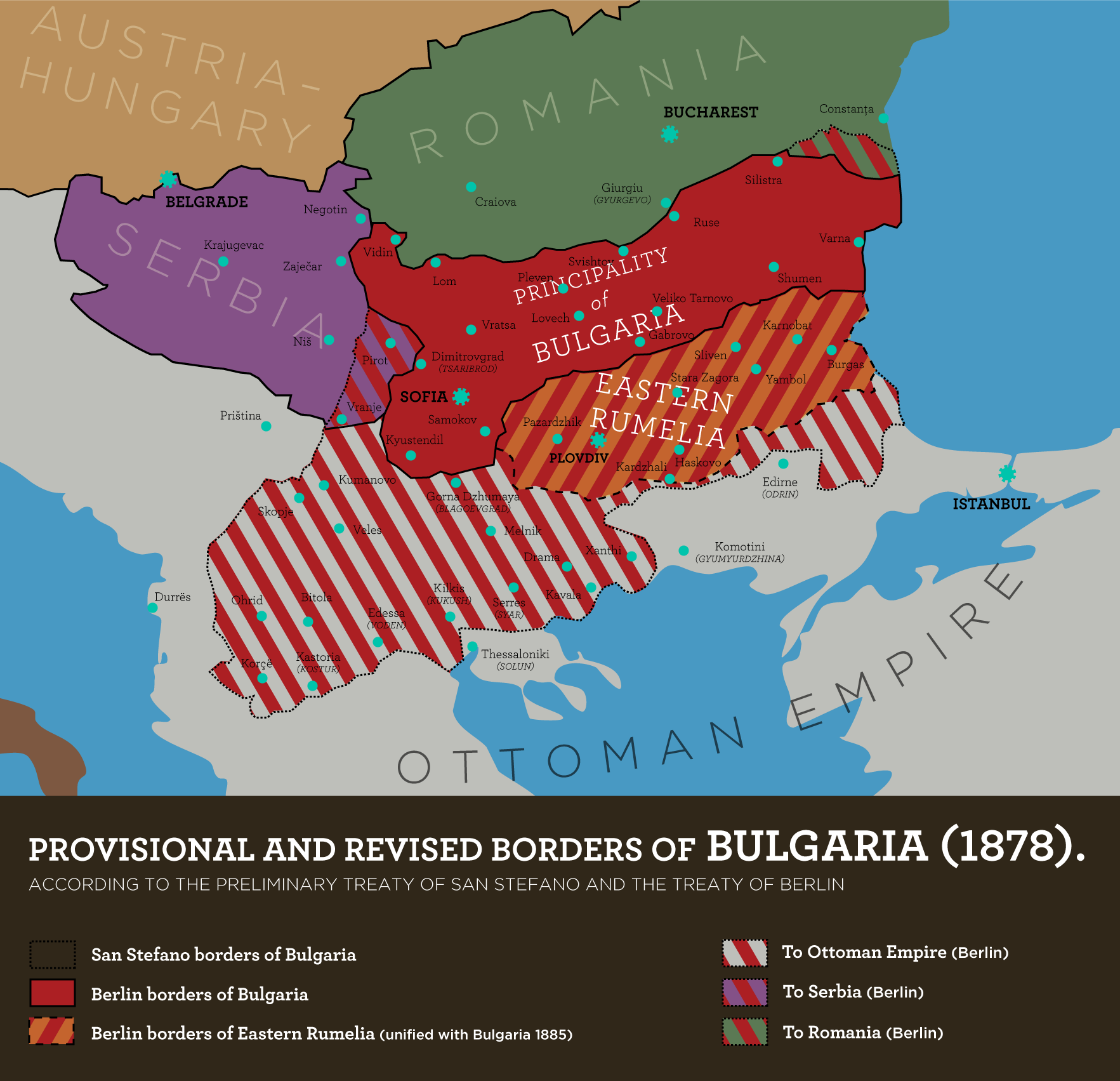
Map of San Stefano Bulgaria with Eastern Rumelia visible in red and orange stripes.

Immediately after the end of the Russo-Turkish War (1877–1878) that resulted in the creation of a new liberated Bulgarian state, Velichkov returned to Pazardzhik. Soon it became obvious, though, that the Great powers had other intentions. San-Stefano Bulgaria was partitioned into several parts, some of which gained independence, others were returned to the Empire. Velichkov's home town became part of the newly formed state of Eastern Rumelia which remained a vassal to the Sultan. He started a political career and in 1894 got to head the ministry of education. All this time Velichkov actively participated in the strive for unification between Eastern Rumelia and the Principality of Bulgaria. All efforts were rewarded in 1885 when the actual unification took place. Meanwhile Velichkov managed to study law in France (till 1881) and later, during Stefan Stambolov's rule in Bulgaria, painting in Florence, Italy. Later he taught in the Bulgarian Men's High School of Thessaloniki and lived for a few years in Istanbul.

Velichkov continued his political career with the People's party (Bulgarian: Народната партия) and was minister on a number of times as well as ambassador in Serbia (1902-1904). He was an active member of the Bulgarian Academy of Sciences. Konstantin Velichkov died on his way to Grenoble in November 1907. Two years later his remains were returned to Sofia.

On January 28, 1998, a Sofia metro station was named in his honor.
