= Inekon T8M-700IT =

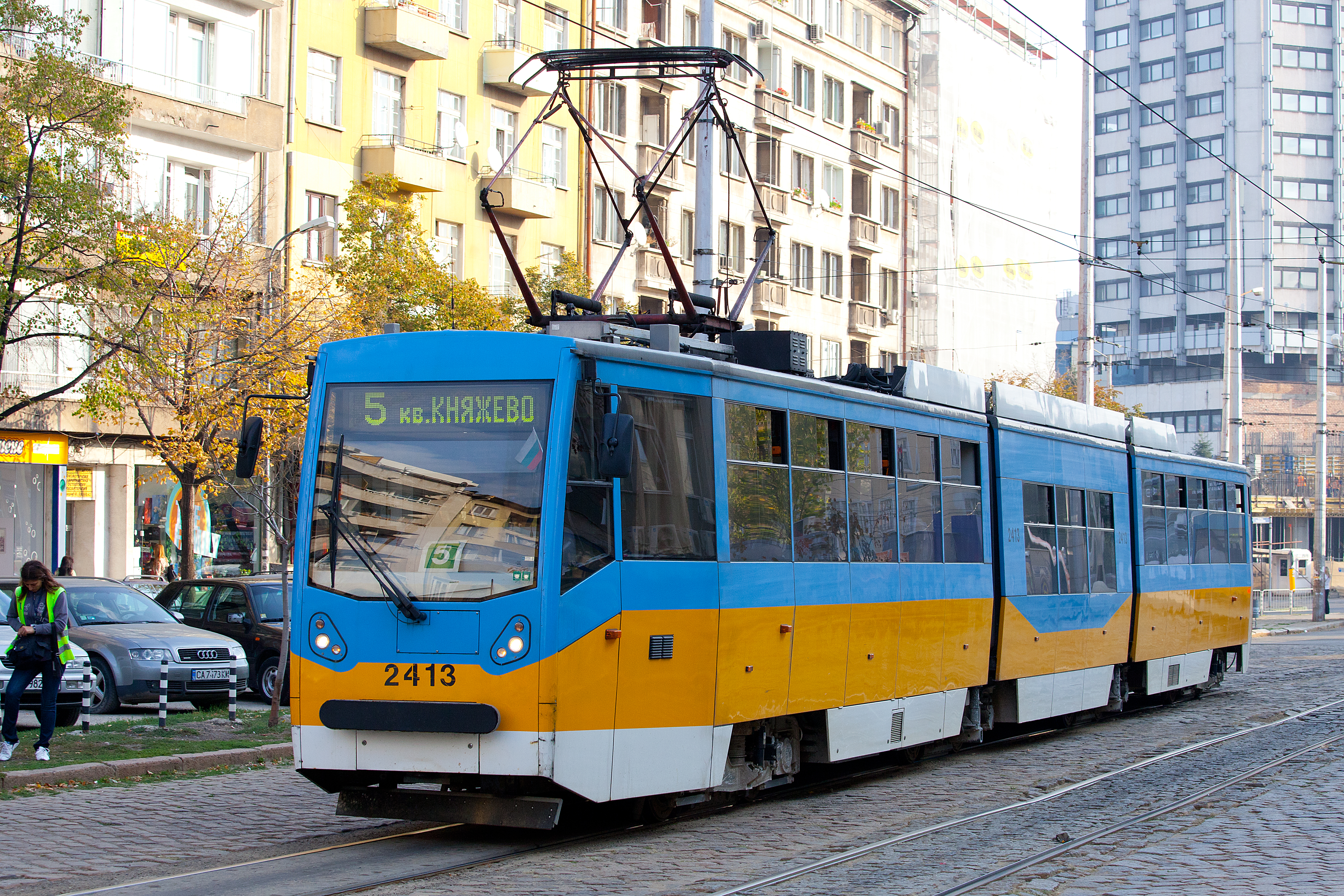
- In service: 2009 - present
- Manufacturers: Inekon and Tramkar
- Number built: 18
- Operator: Sofia

Specifications
- Width: 2250 mm
- Height: 3100 mm
- Low-floor: low-entry
- Weight: 30040 kg
- Track gauge: 1,009 mm (3 ft 3 23/32 in)

Inekon T8M-700IT is a tram produced by Inekon based on the T6M-700 model of Tramkar. A total number of 18 trams were produced. They entered service in Sofia in 2009. The Inekon T8M-700IT now operates in the Banishora depot and runs on lines 6,11,12.

== Operations in Sofia ==
The Inekon T8M-700IT first entered service in 2009. They ranged from 2401 to 2418 and operated in Krasna Polyana depot. These trams had a low floor middle section, followed by 2 high floor sections. Its construction was FHF [Front High Floor] + MLF [Middle Low Floor] + BHF [Back High Floor]. They used to operate on lines like 7, 7A,18, 4 and 5. The trams' iconic acceleration and breaking sound were possible with the Cegelec TV Europulse inverter.

=== Operations from Banishora depot ===
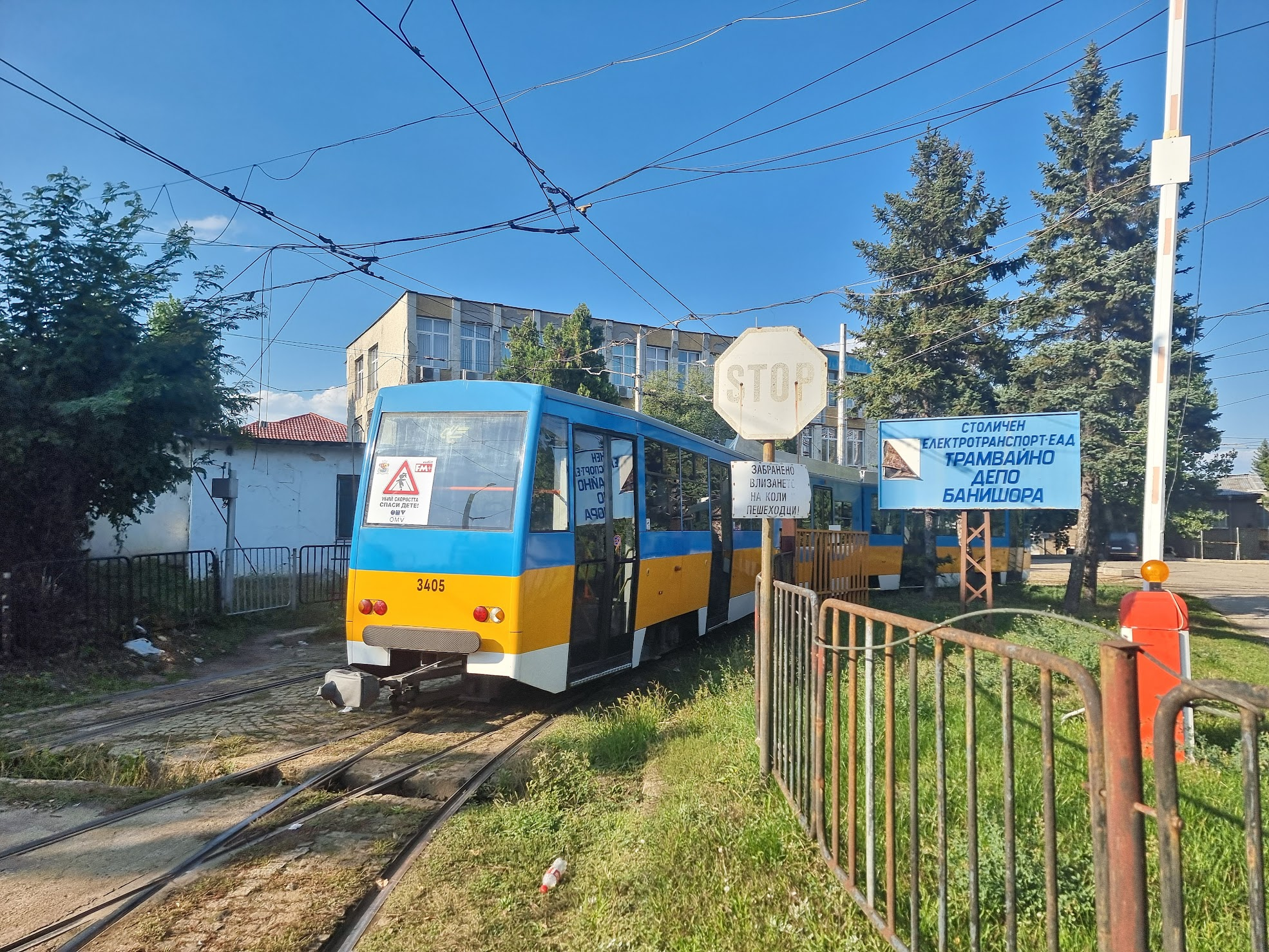
3405 going back to depot after a shift.

These trams were reassigned to Banishora depot. Now ranging from 3401 to 3418 they run on lines like 11,12 and line 6. They were moved because now Pesa Swings dominate line 5, also because Banishora depot had a tram shortage after the T6M-700 got scrapped due to it being old.
