= T8M-900 =

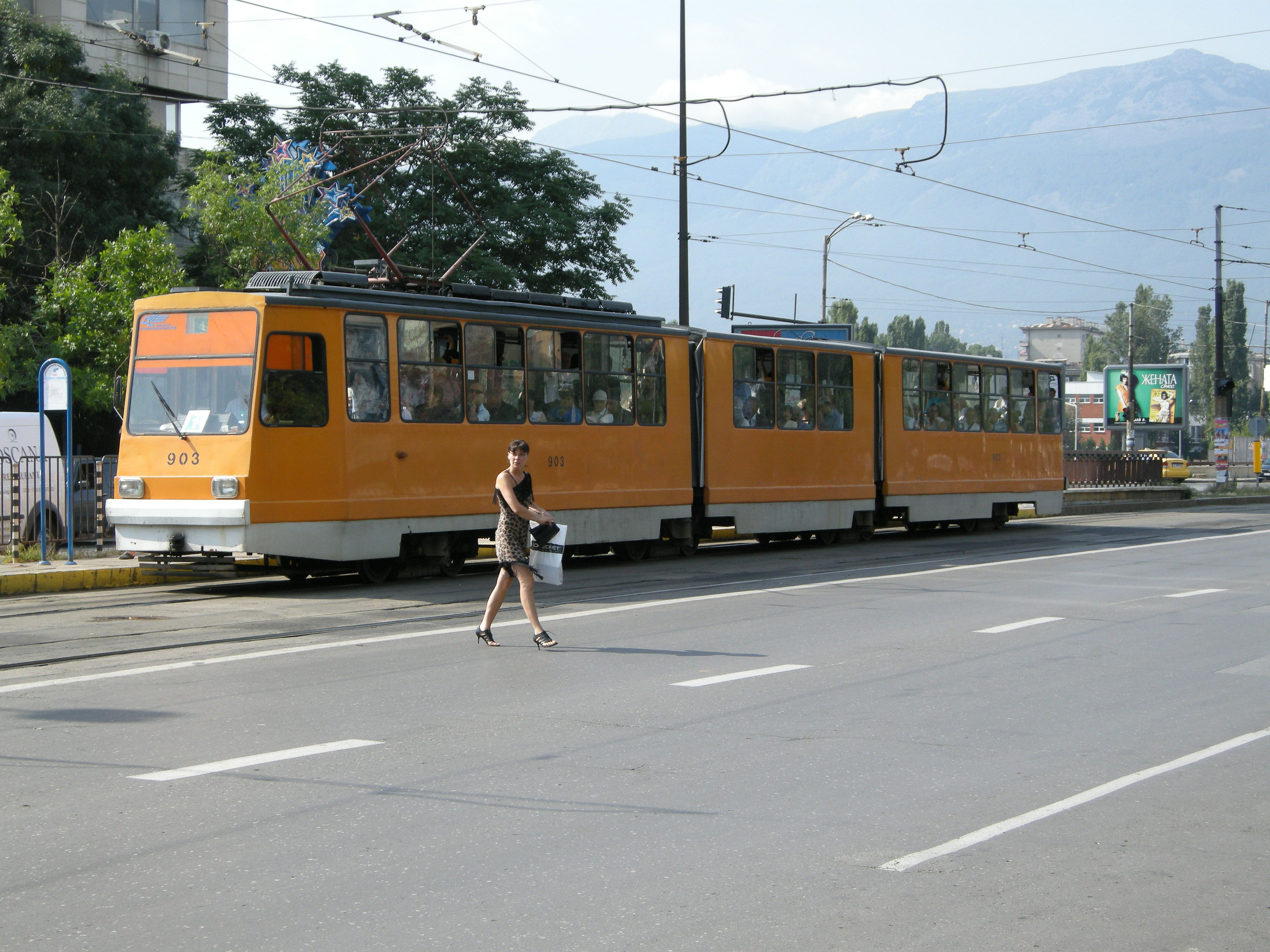
- Stock type: Tram
- Manufacturer: Tramkar
- Constructed: 1991

Specifications
- Train length: 26.53 m
- Width: 2.25 metres (7.4 ft)
- Height: 3.14 metres (10.3 ft)
- Articulated sections: 3
- Maximum speed: 60 kilometres per hour (37 mph)
- Weight: 29.5 tonnes (65,000 lb)
- Track gauge: 1,009 mm (3 ft 3 23/32 in)

T8M-900 is a tram manufactured by the Bulgarian company Tramkar in Sofia in 1991.

== Description ==
It's yellow-orange coloured with a white stripe at the bottom.

== Potential use in protests ==
In 2018, potentially as protest, one of these was put in Triagalnika at a rail bridge underpass. This is because there was a plan to the destroy the line that went from Obelya to Ivan Vazov.

== See also ==
- T8M-900M
