= Poduyane railway station =

Railway station in Sofia, Bulgaria

Poduyane Подуяне
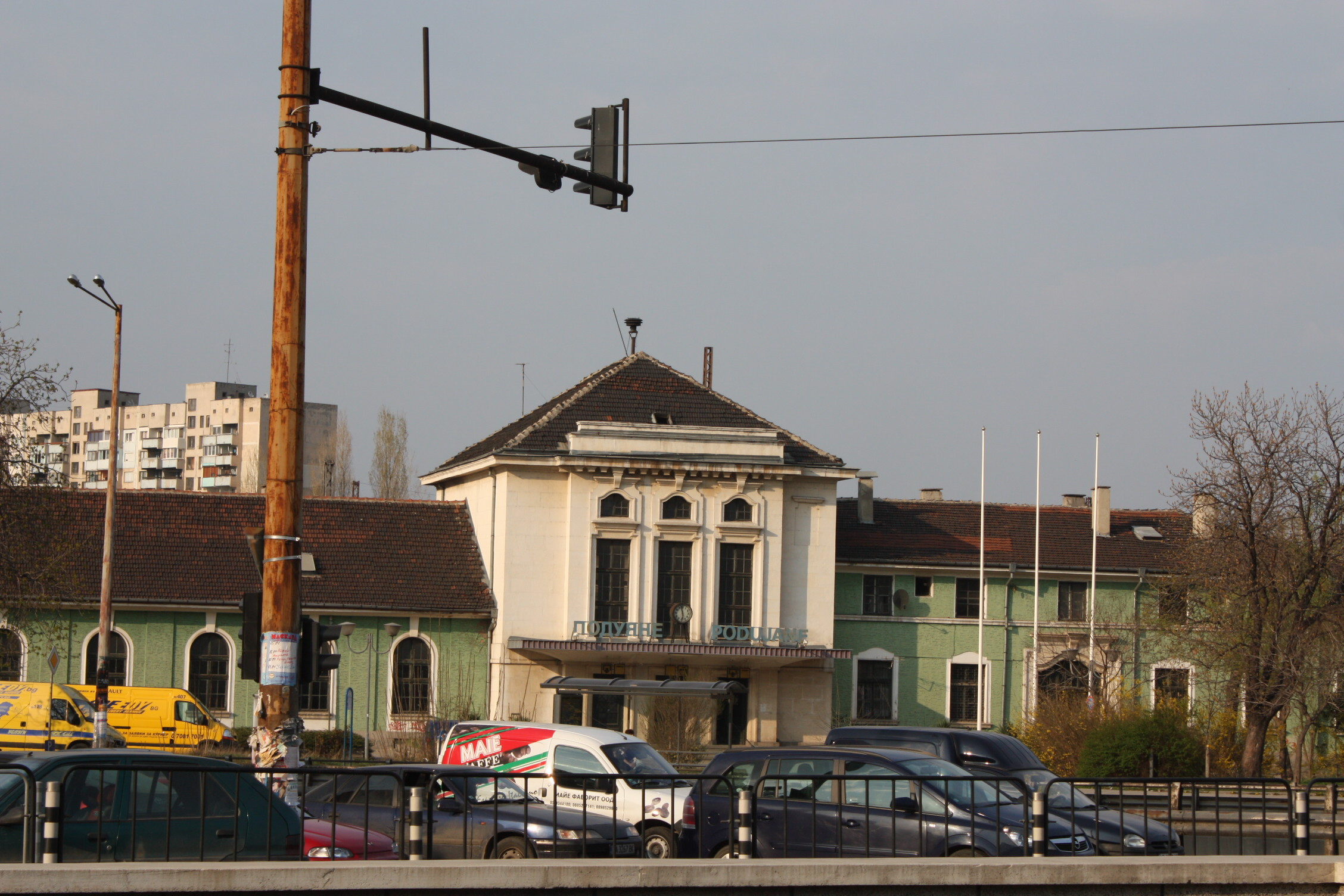
- The station in 2009

General information
- Location: Poduyane, Sofia; Bulgaria
- Coordinates: 42.697908°N 23.354743°E

History
- Opened: 1917; 1930 (current building)
Location

Poduyane railway station (Bulgarian: Железопътна гара Подуяне) is the second largest railway station in Sofia, Bulgaria, after Sofia Central Station. It is located in Poduyane district and lies between Sitnyakovo Boulevard and General Danail Nikolaev Boulevard. The station building dates from 1930 and was mostly unchanged until its restoration in 2020.

== Transport links ==
- Tramway service: lines 20, 21, 22
- Bus service: lines 11, 72, 75, 305, 404, 413
