= Opalchenska Metro Station =

Sofia metro station

Opalchenska Опълченска
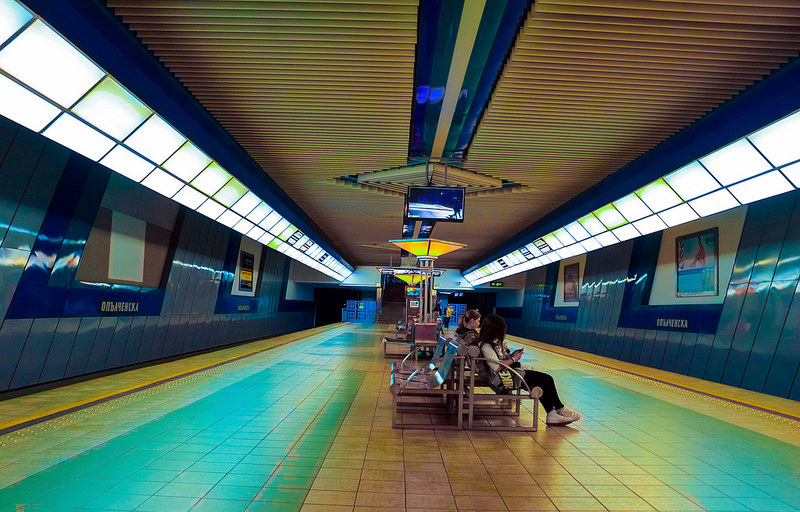

General information
- Location: 1000 Sofia Center, Sofia
- Coordinates: 42°42′00″N 23°18′36″E
- Owner: Sofia Municipality
- Operator: Metropoliten JSC
- Platforms: island
- Tracks: 2
- Bus routes: 3
- Connections
- Tram: 3, 8, 10, 20, 21, 22
- Trolleybus: 1, 3, 5, 7
- Bus: 60, 74, N1

Construction
- Structure type: sub-surface
- Platform levels: 2
- Parking: no
- Cycle facilities: no
- Accessible: an elevator to platforms
- Architect: I. Stanishev; Krasen Andreev

Other information
- Status: Staffed
- Station code: 3011; 3012
- Website: Official website

History
- Opened: 17 September 1999

Passengers
- 2020: 405,000

Services
Preceding station	Sofia Metro	Following station
Konstantin Velichkov towards Slivnitsa	M1 line	Serdika towards Business Park Sofia
Konstantin Velichkov towards Slivnitsa	M4 line	Serdika towards Sofia Airport
Location

Opalchenska Metro Station (Bulgarian: Метростанция „Опълченска“) is a station on the Sofia Metro in Bulgaria. It opened on 17 September 1999.

== Location ==
The metro station lies under Todor Alexandrov Boulevard between Opalchenska Street and Hristo Botev Boulevard. The west vestibule has 4 entries on the intersection of Todor Alexandrov Boulevard and Opalchenska Street and the east vestibule has 2 entries on the intersection of Todor Alexandrov Boulevard and Strandzha Street.

== Architecture ==
The platform and the concourses have a modern design. The platform is a non-column type. The floors are lined with ceramic panels in brown-beige and green color corresponding to the outlook of the ceiling. The ceiling at the platform is made of vertical aluminum frames, forming figures with color stripes at the edges, placed above the lamps along the axis of the station. Groups of stainless steel benches are placed around the lamps. Sloping metal panels framed with blue and green stripes are put on the walls of the platform. The main lighting fixture is installed into inclined milk-white panels, placed at both ends of the platform. In the concourses it is installed into the suspended ceilings. The concourses are lined with granite and aluminum plates, while the underpasses are implemented with mineral masonry, forming geometric shapes. The suspended ceilings are white, made of 30 cm components of Hunter Douglas type, longitudinally arranged with colored stripes. The entrances are lined with beige marble and poly-carbonate arch-shaped coverings.

The architectural layout is created by architects I. Stanishev and Kr. Andreev. A draft, created by the same authors and put up to competitive procedure is serving as a base of the final design.

== Automatic Platform Screen Door (APSD) ==
In September 2020, Automatic Platform screen doors started to operate at Opalchenska Metro station after a month such barriers were launched at the Vasil Levski Stadium Metro Station of the Sofia Metro. By 2022, this RSD (Rope-type Screen Door) system will be implemented at the busiest 12 stations of the Line 1 and Line 2 of the Sofia Metro.

== Interchange with other public transport ==
- Tramway service: 3, 8, 10, 20, 21, 22
- Trolleybus service: 1, 3, 5, 7
- Bus service: 60, 74
