= T8M-900M =

Bulgarian tram

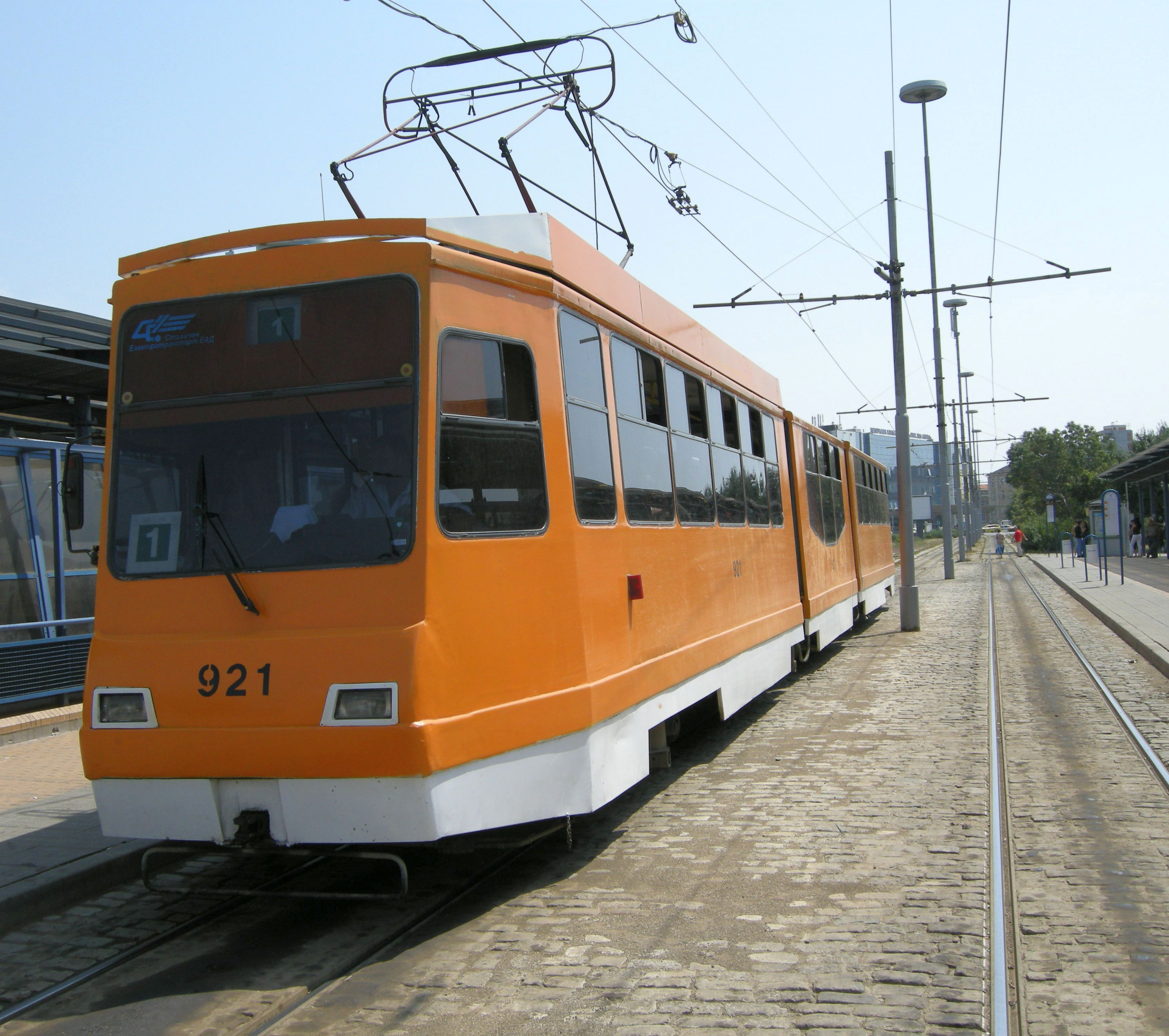
- A T8M-900M tram
- Manufacturer: Tramkar
- Constructed: 1999-2001
- Number under construction: 25
- Predecessor: T8M-900

Specifications
- Articulated sections: 3
- Maximum speed: 60 km/h (37 mph)
- Power output: 200 kW
- Track gauge: 1,009 mm (3 ft 3 23/32 in)

T8M-900M is a tram which is serving the tram system of Sofia, Bulgaria. The trams were made between 1999 and 2001 by Tramkar as a renovation of the older T8M-900 trams. They have 3 sections (the second is low-floor) and they can carry up to 300 passengers. Their maximum speed is 60 km/h. They are orange with a white line on the bottom. The power of their two motors is 200 kW. They move on 1,009 mm (3 ft 3 23/32 in) gauge track (narrow gauge) and can accelerate extremely fast for trams, faster than the newest, modern trams. One very good thing for these trams is that they are very light. A tram is about 30 tons. That is with 10 tons lighter than the new, modern ones. They are symbols of Sofia and her appearance.
