= Russian Monument, Sofia =

Monument in Sofia, Bulgaria

Coordinates: 42°41′32.06″N 23°18′37.37″E

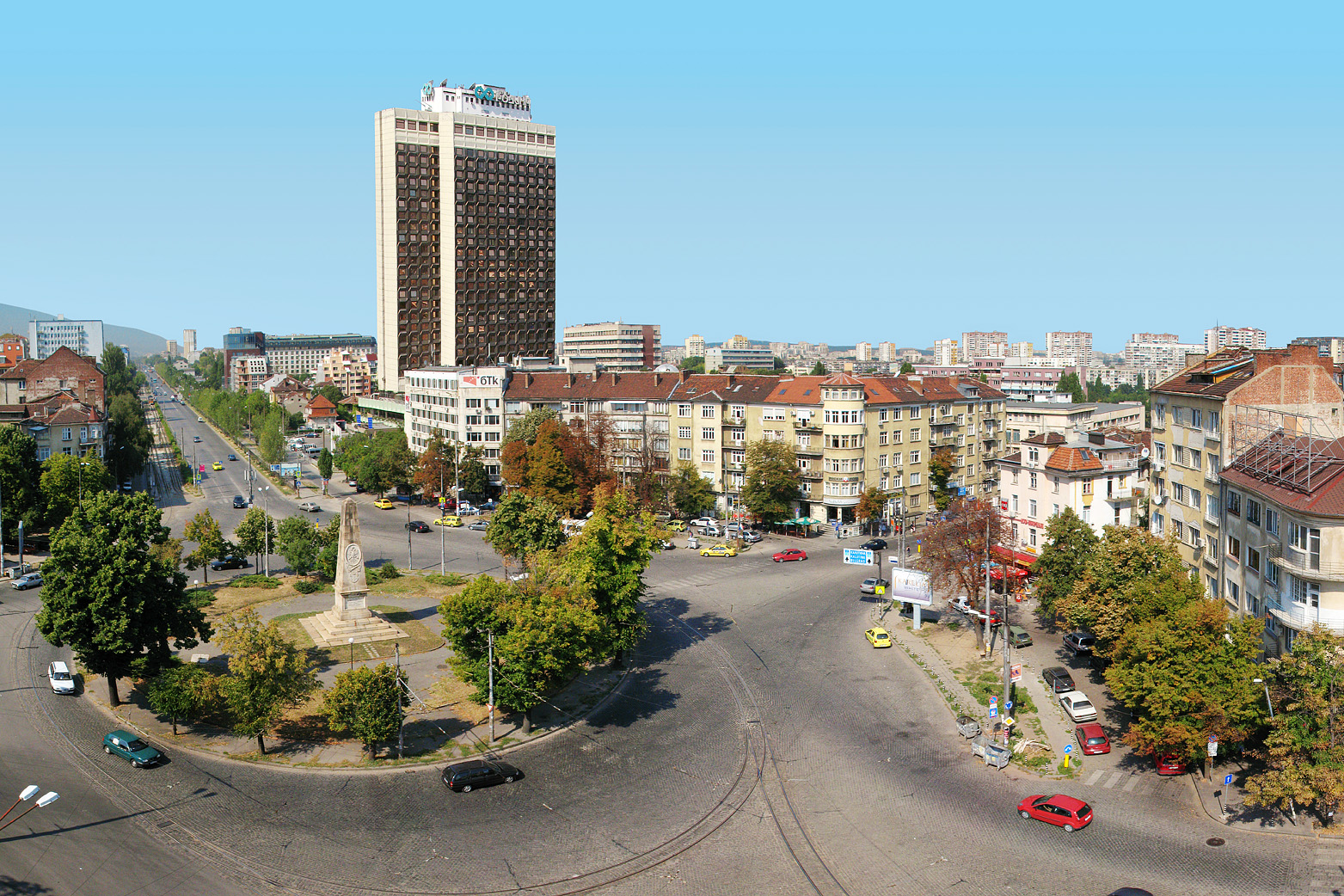
The Russian Monument junction in 2009

The Russian Monument (Bulgarian: Руски паметник, Ruski pametnik) is a monument in Sofia, the capital of Bulgaria. The first monument to be built in the capital of the newly liberated Principality of Bulgaria, it was unveiled on 29 June 1882 and is located on the road which Osman Nuri Paşa used to flee from Sofia to Pernik on 22 December 1877.

The funds for the construction of the memorial were collected by the Russian people. It is not exactly known who designed the monument, but it is supposed to be either the architect Vokar, who designed such monuments in Dobrich, Pleven Razgrad, Veliko Tarnovo, Svishtov, or Vladimir Sherwood, who worked in Pleven. The monument is an obelisk: a rectangular pyramid with a truncated top and a three-step pedestal. The eastern side of the memorial features a marble relief of the coat of arms of Russia and the Order of St. George, and a text commemorating Alexander II in pre-reform Russian. The western side features another inscribed plate.

In the late 19th and early 20th century, the monument turned into a centre of the urban planning strategy for this part of Sofia. Today, it stands in the middle of an important round junction of the Skobelev and Totleben boulevards. The Five Corners junction, Macedonia Square and the Pirogov Hospital are located in the vicinity.

== Gallery ==
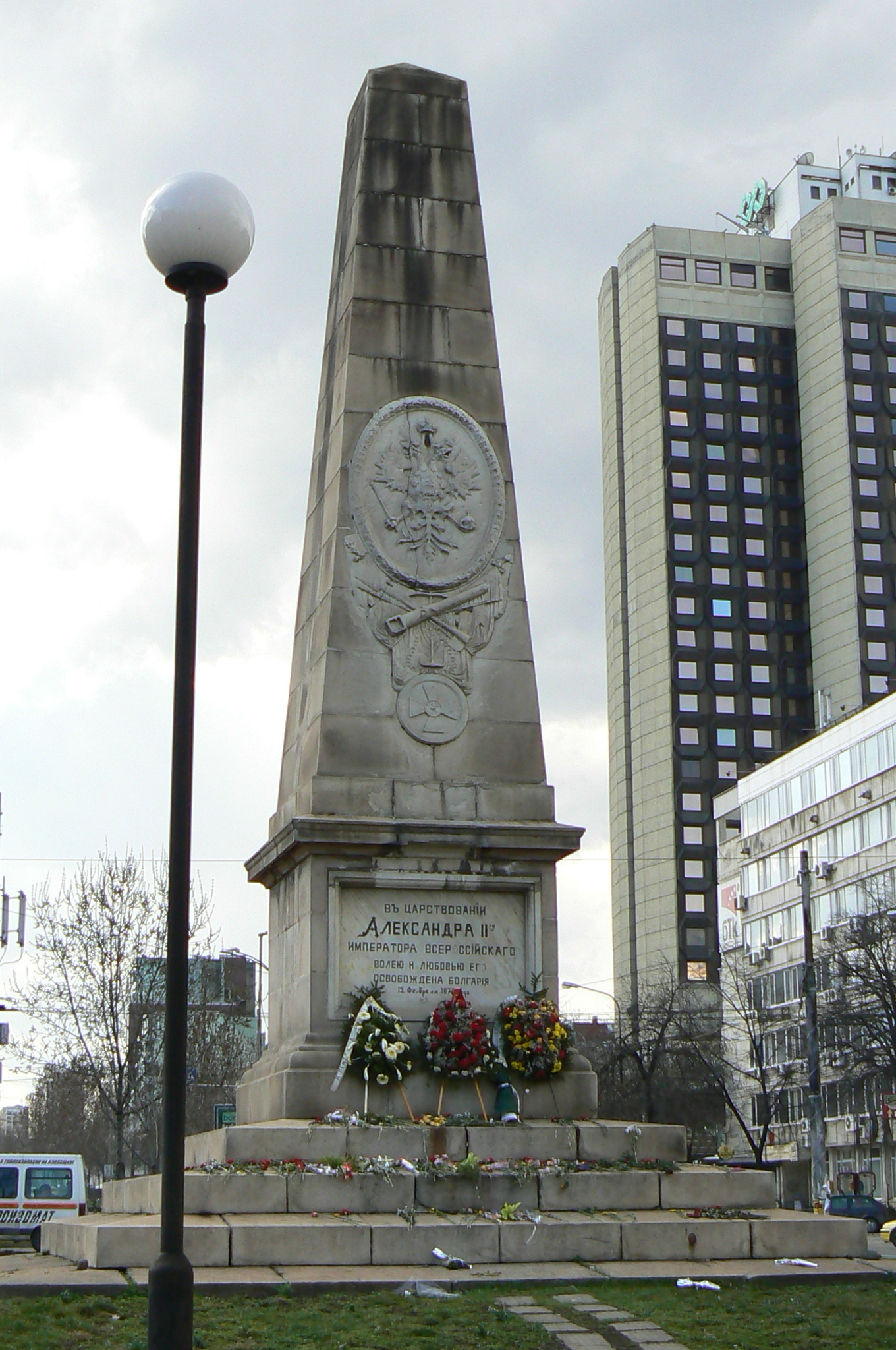
The Russian Monument in Sofia, Bulgaria

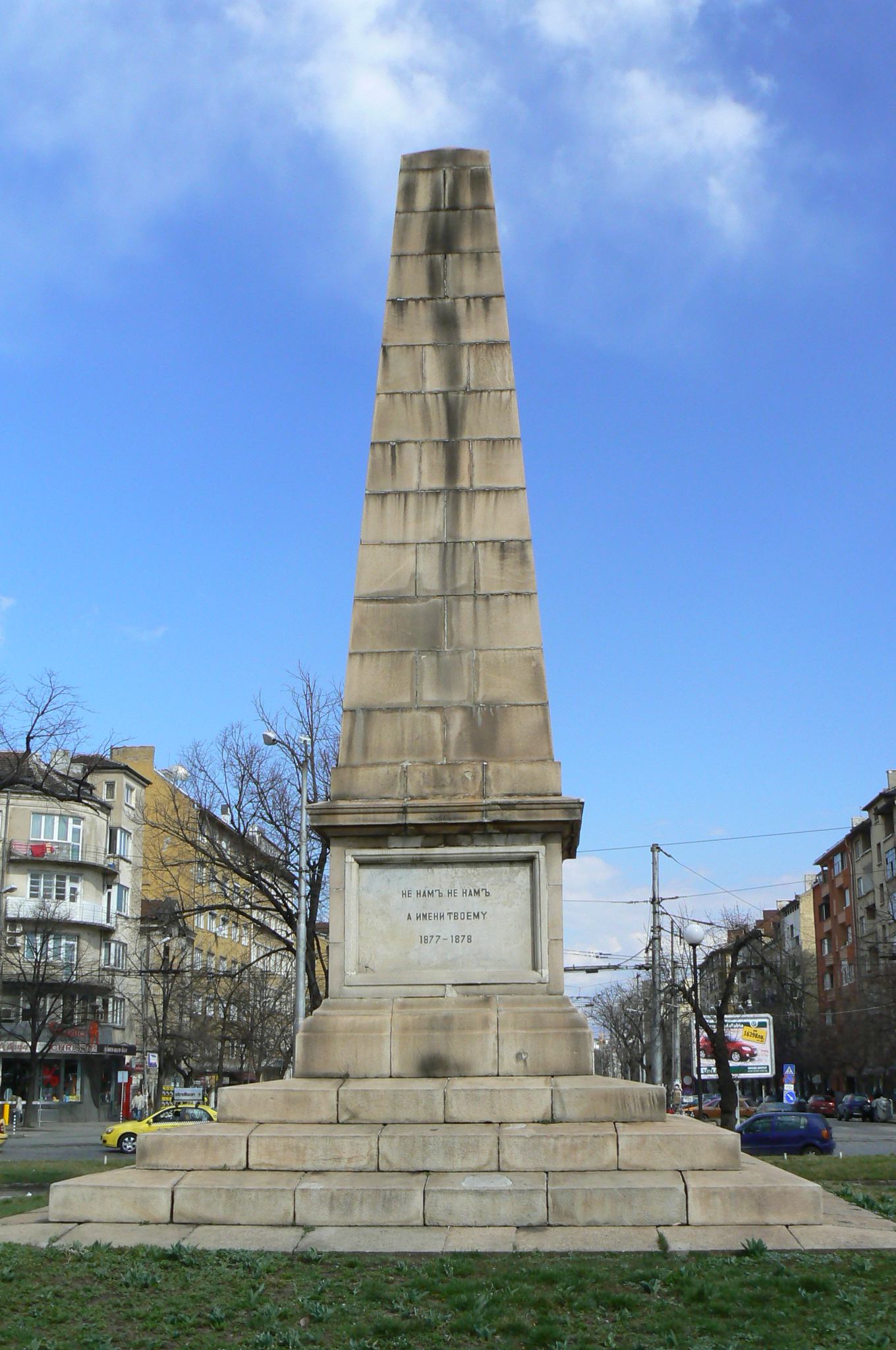
Western side

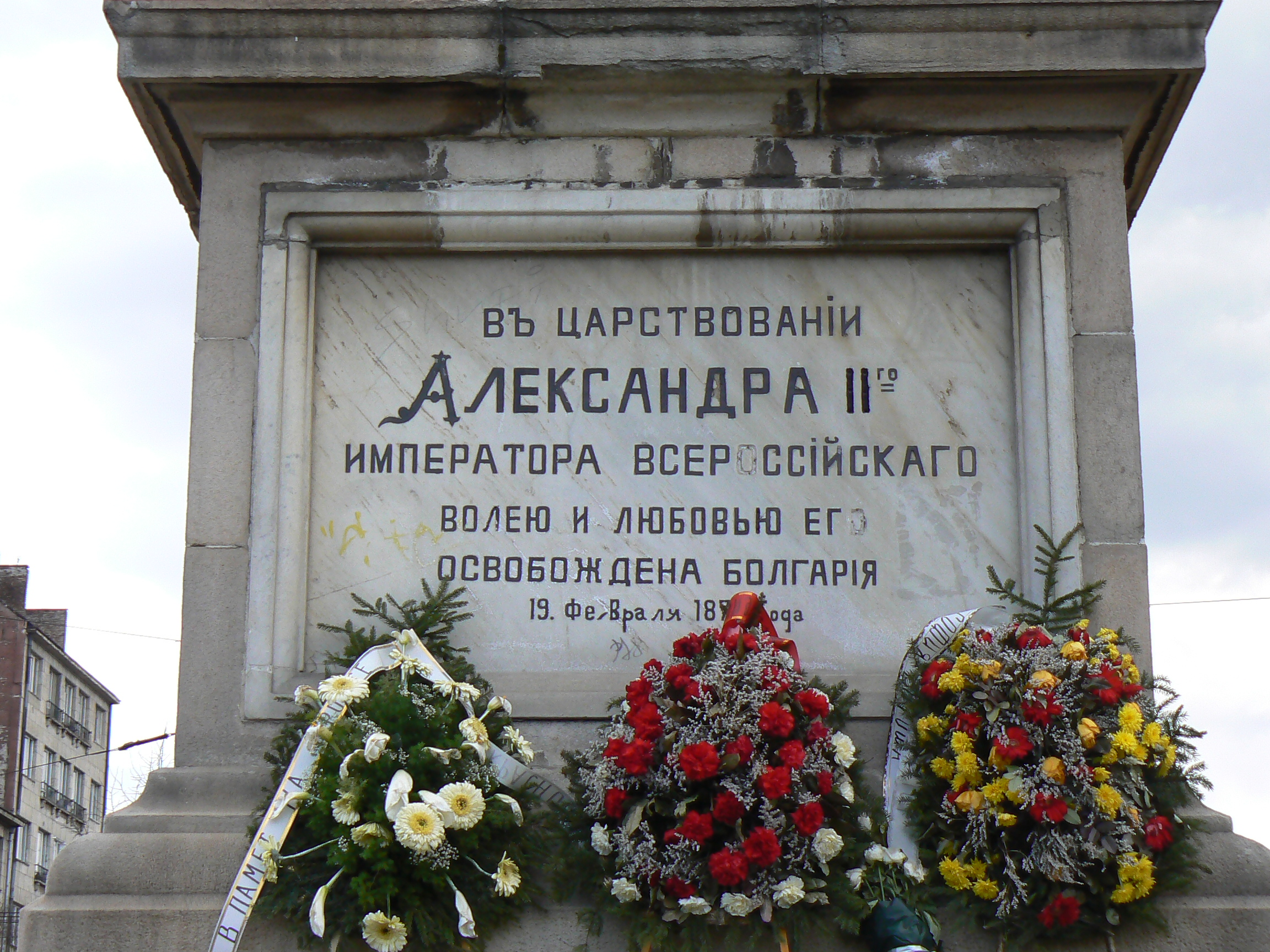
Plate on the eastern side

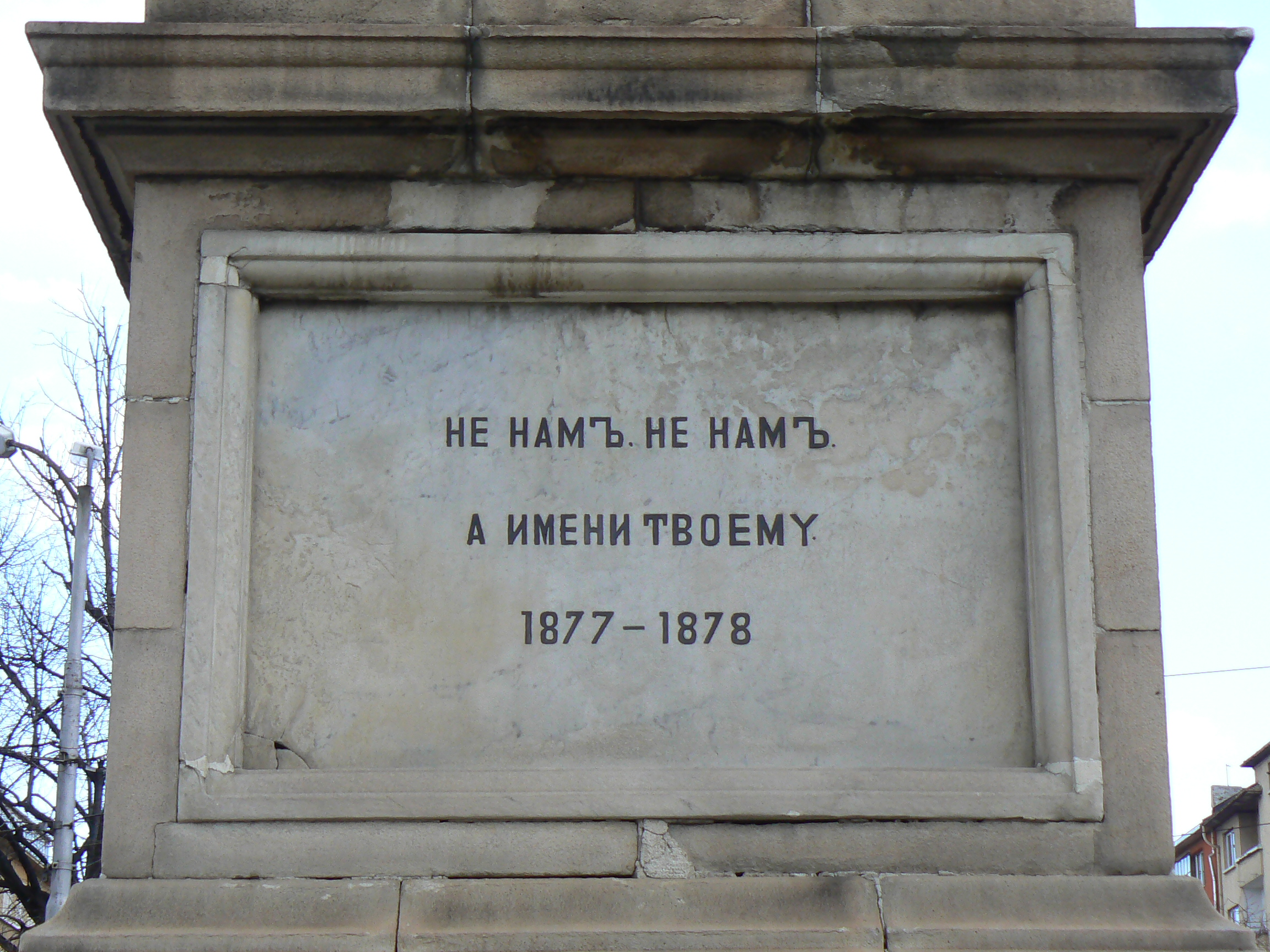
Plate on the western side

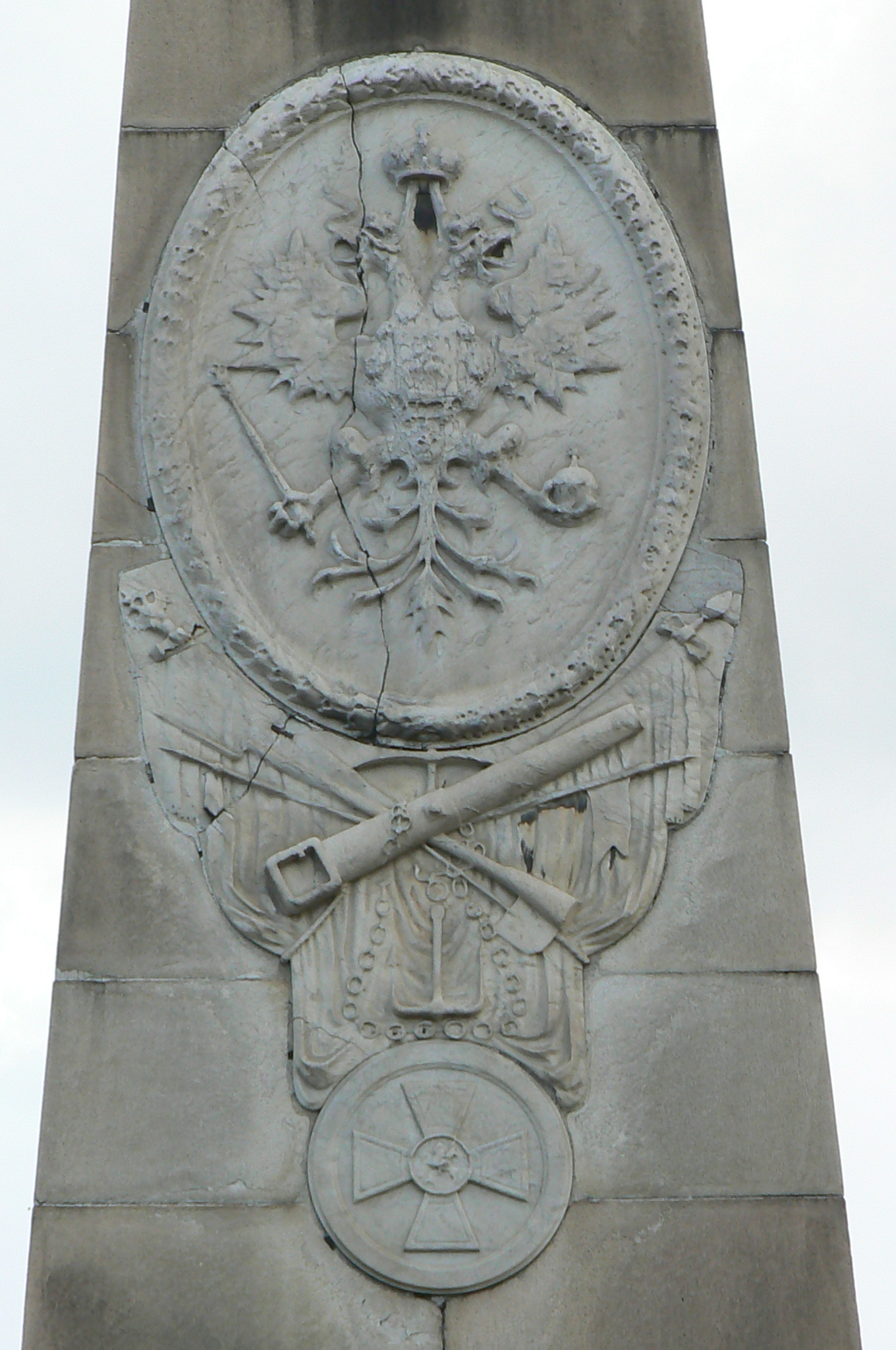
Relief
