= Macedonia Square, Sofia =

Square in Sofia, Bulgaria

Macedonia Square
- Public square
- Площад „Македония“
- View of the intersection, with Telus Tower in the background
- Owner: Sofia
- Location in Sofia
- Coordinates: 42°41′41″N 23°18′55″E

Macedonia Square (Bulgarian: площад „Македония“, ploshtad Makedoniya) is a main city square and junction in the center of Sofia, the capital of Bulgaria. Prior to the democratic changes in 1989 it was named after Dimitar Blagoev.

The main roads crossing the square are Macedonia Boulevard, Hristo Botev Boulevard and Alabin Street, which leads to the central Vitosha Boulevard. Several tram lines pass through the square. The buildings of the Ministry of Agriculture, Food and Forestry and the Road Infrastructure Agency are located nearby. The square is an area of rapid urban development with two of the tallest buildings in the city are located there and another one is under construction.

== Gallery ==
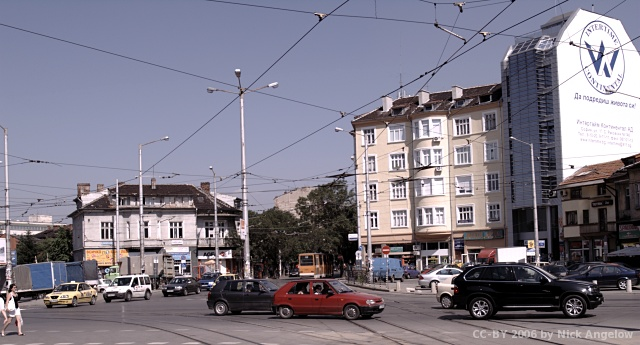
Macedonia Square in 2006

The square in 2012

== See also ==
- Russian monument
