= Konstantin Velichkov Metro Station =

Sofia metro station

Konstantin Velichkov Константин Величков
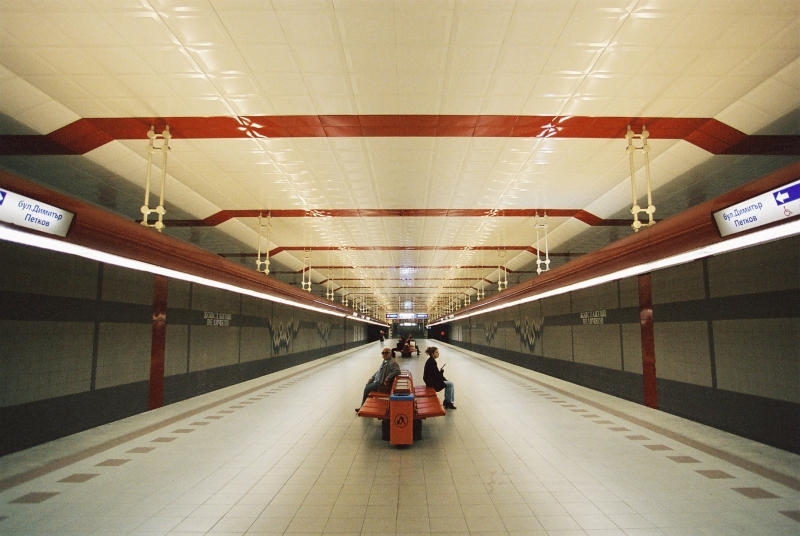

General information
- Location: 1309 Sofia Center, Sofia
- Coordinates: 42°42′07″N 23°17′54″E
- Owner: Sofia Municipality
- Operator: Metropoliten JSC
- Platforms: island
- Tracks: 2
- Bus routes: 3
- Connections
- Tram: 3, 8, 10, 11, 22
- Bus: 11, 83, N1

Construction
- Structure type: sub-surface
- Platform levels: 2
- Parking: no
- Cycle facilities: no
- Accessible: none
- Architect: Slavey Galabov

Other information
- Status: Staffed
- Station code: 3009; 3010
- Website: Official website

History
- Opened: 28 January 1998

Passengers
- 2020: 385,000

Services
Preceding station	Sofia Metro	Following station
Vardar towards Slivnitsa	M1 line	Opalchenska towards Business Park Sofia
Vardar towards Slivnitsa	M4 line	Opalchenska towards Sofia Airport
Location

Konstantin Velichkov Metro Station (Bulgarian: Метростанция "Константин Величков") is a station on the Sofia Metro in Bulgaria. It is named after writer and politician Konstantin Velichkov and opened on 28 January 1998.

== Interchange with other public transport ==
- Tramway service: 3, 8, 10, 11, 22
- City Bus service: 11, 83, N1
