= Tramkar =

Bulgarian tram manufacturer

Tramkar (Bulgarian: Трамкар) is a Bulgarian tram manufacturer based in Sofia. It repairs and renovates vehicles of the Sofia tram and trolleybus systems. Tramkar also manufactured trams and trolleybuses from the early 1950's until 1991, it also used to restore, modernize and refurbish old tram models that it made earlier. Today it serves as a tram repairing company in Sofia.

== Tram models ==
-Produced

- T4M-221 "Republika"
- T4M-701 "Komsomolets"
- T6M-901 "Kosmonavt"
- T6M-801 "Sofia 65"
- T8M-730 "Sofia 70"
- T6M-400 "Sofia 100"
- T8M-301 "Bulgaria 1300"
- T6K-503
- T6M-700
- T6MD-1000
- C6K-1000

-Refurbished and modernized

- T8M-700M
- T8M-900M
- T6MD-1000M
- Inekon T8M-700IT
- T8K-503
- T6M-700F
- T8M-900F

== Trolleybuses ==
The following list is incomplete.

- TB-51
- Tramkar Chavdar
- Guleruz Cobra
- Guleruz Cobra 272
