= Orlandovtsi =

Neighbourhood of Sofia, Bulgaria

Coordinates: 42°44′N 23°20′E

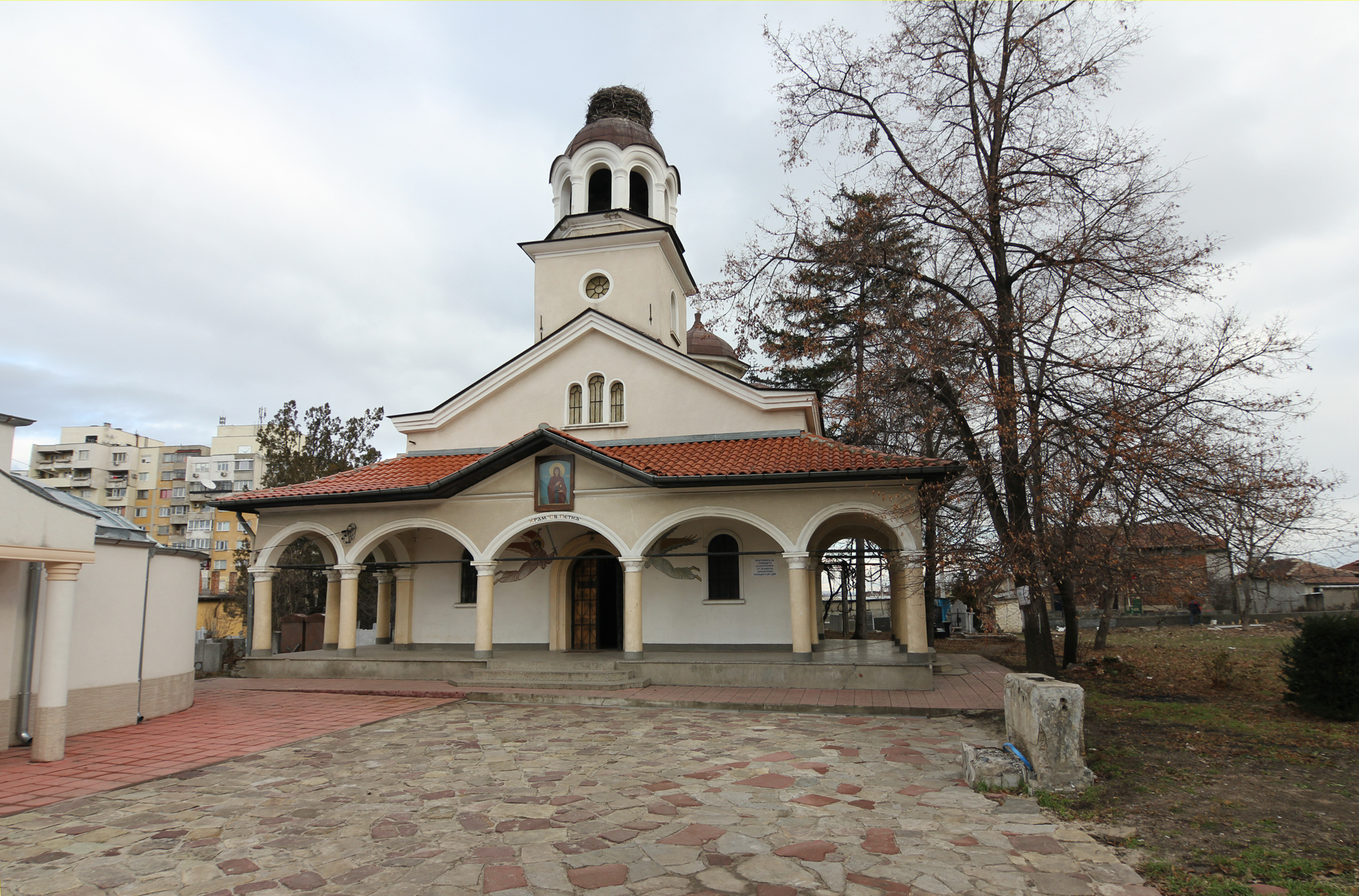
Saint Petka church in Orlandovtsi

Orlandovtsi (Bulgarian: Орландовци [orˈɫandoft͜si], also transliterated as Orlandovci or Orlandovtzi) is a neighbourhood of Sofia, the capital of Bulgaria. It lies in the northeast of the city and is administratively part of the Serdika municipality.

Orlandovtsi lies between Malashevtsi to the southeast and Iliyantsi to the northwest. The neighbourhood has two Bulgarian Orthodox churches and a school. It includes the Central Sofia Cemetery, popularly known as the Orlandodvtsi Cemetery.

Orlandovtsi has been part of Sofia since 1961; before that date, it was a separate village. It was first mentioned in historical records in 1420, with several more references throughout the 18th century. According to the prevalent and scientifically accepted etymology, Orlandovtsi's name is derived from the personal name Orlando, whose bearer is theorized to have been a Western European crusader.
