= Trams in Sofia =

Overview of the tram system of Sofia, Bulgaria

Sofia tramway network
- Софийска трамвайна мрежа
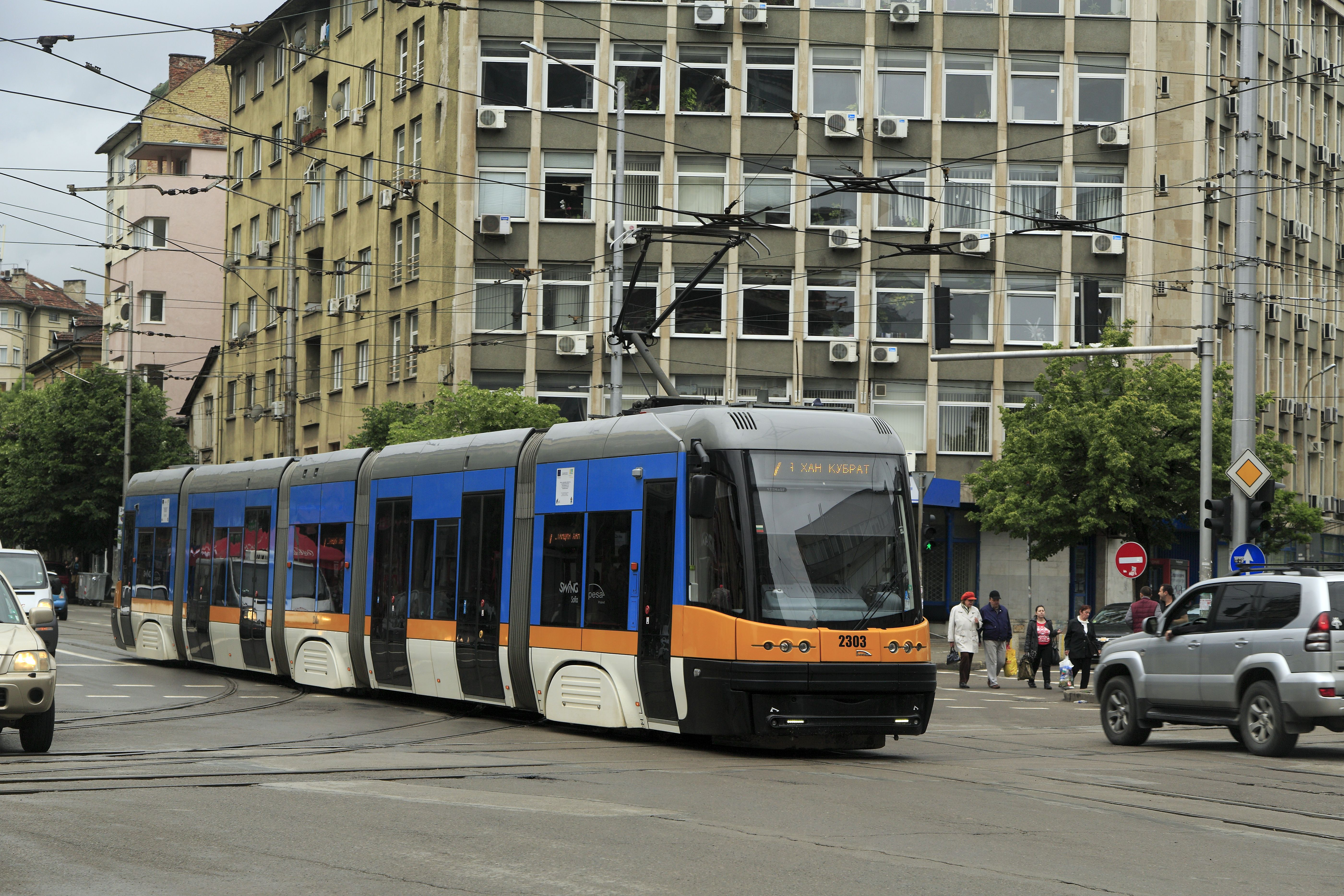
- Blvd. Christo Botev, ET 2303

Operation
- Locale: Sofia, Bulgaria
- Open: 1 January 1901
- Status: In operation
- Lines: 18
- Owner: Stolichna Municipality
- Operator: Sofia Electric Transport JSC

Infrastructure
- Track gauge: 1,009 mm (3 ft 3 23/32 in); 1,435 mm (4 ft 8 1/2 in) standard gauge
- Stock: 176

Statistics
- Track length (single): 308 km (191 mi)
- Route length: ~ 154 km (96 mi)
- Stops: 165
Overview

The Sofia tram network is a part of the public transportation system of Sofia, the capital of Bulgaria. It began operation on January 1, 1901. As of 2006, the tram system included approximately 308 kilometres (191 miles) of narrow and standard gauge one-way track. Most of the track is a narrow gauge (1,009 mm (3 ft 3 23/32 in)), with standard gauge (1,435 mm (4 ft 8 1/2 in)) used on lines 20, 21, 22 and 23 and accounting for approximately 40 kilometres (25 mi) of the system's track length.

== History ==
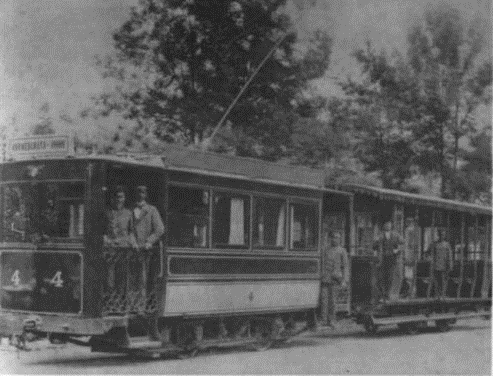
Tram in Knyazhevo, 1901

The realization of the idea to build a network of tram lines in Sofia began on December 1, 1898, when the Sofia Municipality granted a concession for the construction of tram lines to companies from France and Belgium. The construction work lasted about a year and on 1 January 1901 the first tram in Sofia officially started. Initially, passengers were served by 25 cars and 10 trailers - two-axle, wooden-bodied, which ran on 6 routes with a total length of 23 km and a single track with a gauge of 1,000 mm (3 ft 3 3/8 in) metre gauge.

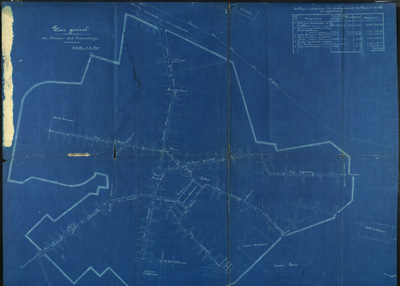
The network in 1909

Between 1903 and 1931, a large number of railcars and trailers were delivered from European manufacturers. In 1931, under the direction of Eng. Theodosii Kardalev began production of the first Bulgarian trailers, which used sturdy chassis from already scrapped railcars. These trailers are known as the "Kardalev's trailers". In 1936, the first Bulgarian railcars were produced under the brand name "DTO" (Дирекция на трамваите и осветлението - Direktsia na tramvaite i osvetlenieto: Department for trams and lighting, owned by Sofia municipality). Old chassis were used in their production, and all other elements were replaced with new ones.

In 1934, the first large tram depot was built on the territory of today's Krasno Selo municipality. In 1951 a factory for the production of tram cars was established there. It was the successor of the factory founded by Eng. Theodosii Kardalev's technical workshop of DTO.

This tram manufacturer (known as Трамваен завод - Tramvaen zavod: Tram plant) was named "Трамкар" (Tramkar: Tram car) in 1990 and was a registered company Tramkar till 2008. By 1959, a total of 155 "DTO" and "Republika" trams had been produced there. The last tram, T8M-900 was delivered in 1991 and is still in use. Since then the factory has been used to repair and renovate old trams

In 1951 the T4M-221 (Republic), which is considered the highest-quality Bulgarian tram, was produced in DTO. The T4M-221 is the first Bulgarian four-row tram. The "Republic" model was in production in 1951 and 1959, bearing the numbers 221 to 240. They also had trailers numbered 521-544. The motor cars, along with their trailers, mainly worked on line 5. They were assigned to the Krasno Selo tram depot (later Krasna Polyana). In 1981 motor car 240 and wagon 540 were rebuilt and put into operation for about a year. The 240 motor car and trailer 538 are still alive today and are expected to be restored. The original stock was 240 + 540, but 540 disappears from the Krasna Polyana depot in unexplained circumstances and again in unexpected circumstances, trailer 538 is found. The "Republika" model was in operation until 1978.

Then the Sofia Tramway Plant launched two new tramcar models: the "Komsomolets" in 1959 and the "Kosmonavt" in 1961.

Based on the experience gained with the Komsomolets and Kosmonavt, and taking into account the design flaws and shortcomings (they paid a very high price with more than 40 killed due to the practical lack of brakes), a new two-section tram was developed and launched in 1965. The unit was named "Sofia" and with its various modifications ("Sofia 70" - three-section, "Sofia 100" - two-section and "Bulgaria 1300" - three-section) gradually established a continuous dominance on Sofia's narrow gauge tracks. The first five "Sofia" units were produced in 1965, each painted in a different colour - yellow, orange, blue, green and burgundy, and the first three-section unit "Sofia 70" appeared in May 1970 in orange-yellow. The two-section "Sofia" railcars (with 4 doors) were of two types: with a lyre and with a pantograph, and were mostly used on lines with a complex longitudinal profile (so-called vertical curves: descents, ascents): lines 6 and 9 in the area of the Hemus Hotel, the NDK underpass and the Nadezhda flyover, and also on lines 2, 14, 19 in the 1960s, 70s and 80s. The three-section "Sofia 70" models (with 5 doors) have pantographs and were mainly used on lines 1, 3, 4, 5, 7, 10, 11, 13 in the 1970s, 1980s and 1990s, as well as on line 21 in the 1980s.

The idea behind the unit was in line with the new trends in railway engineering of the time. However, the design and especially the execution were far behind the technological developments of the time.

The "Sofia" is a two-section, three-bogie unit with the Bo'2'Bo' collinear formula, while the "Sofia 70" is a three-section, Bo'2'2'Bo' unit. All "Sofia 70" trams were taken out of service by 2005.

The three-unit tram "Bulgaria 1300" was built in 1981 to celebrate the 1300th anniversary of the foundation of Bulgaria (681). 26 locomotives were built with serial numbers 301 - 326. The first series of this model ran entirely on the then new line 15 that ran from Ivan Vazov to Nadezhda 5. After that, "Bulgaria 1300" railcars were also used on lines 1 and 7, and partly on line 4.

Due to incidents, the three-section trains "Sofia 70" and "Bulgaria 1300" do not run on lines with complex curvilinear/inclined sections: from Pl. Yordanka Nikolova to the Pioneers' Palace (today: Journalists' Square - Seminary) and the section from the Hemus Hotel to the Vitosha New Otani Hotel (today: Marinella Hotel).

The last Bulgarian double-articulated tram T8M-900, which is still in service today, was produced in the factory in 1991. Since then, the factory has mainly been involved in repairing damaged trams and renovating old ones.

In 2017 the network was complemented with 28 second-hand Be 4/6 S "gherkin" trams partly donated from the BVB section of the tram network of Basel. The trams were constructed in 1990-91 and had low-floor sections inserted in their centre in 1997-99. They replaced older vehicles on lines 6, 8 and 12.

In 1987, the first tram line in Sofia with the standard European track gauge of 1435 mm was opened (the current line 20), connecting the Geo Milev and Druzhba districts. Until then, all tram lines in Sofia were nominally metre gauge, but actually constructed to a width of 1,009 mm (3 ft 3 23/32 in). 8 years later, in 1995, the construction of the second 1435 mm gauge line (now line 22) was completed. The first trams on line 20 in the 1980s were Bulgarian, model T6MD-1000. At the end of the 1980s, ČKD Tatra T6B5 (1435 mm gauge) units were put into service to extend line 20, which runs to the Vasil Levski monument, and at the end of the 1990s to the Youth Theatre.

No other tram lines have been built since then, as Sofia has focused its efforts on the construction of its metro system.

Tram line 21 was temporarily opened with a route from the bus station Iztok to Kv. Geo Milev. (In the 1980s, the same line number had been used on the newly opened narrow-gauge tunnel to Lyulin 5, using "Sofia 70" trams.) On 17 February 2010, line 23 was opened, connecting Zh.k. Druzhba 2 and Zh.k. Druzhba 1. Later the line was extended and by 2013 it connects Zh.k. Druzhba 2 and the Youth Theatre.

On 10 April 2010 a new experimental tram line 4 was opened, auxiliarily to tram line 5. It has a route of Blvd. Nikola Petkov - Macedonia sq. - Central Railway Station - Kv. Orlandovtsi.

In February 2014, after 34 years on the streets of Sofia, the series of trams T8M-301 Bulgaria 1300, which served over the years lines 1, 4, 5, 6, 7, 11, 15, 17, 19, was finally taken out of service.

From 26.05.2014 the series of trams T6M-400 Sofia-100, produced in 1979 - 1986, was also retired.

=== Line closures ===
At the end of the 20th century lines 13, 16 and 17 were closed. In the 21st century, with the expansion of the Sofia metro, many of the tram lines were shortened or closed entirely. Lines 2, 14 and 19, whose route coincided with part of the route of Metropolitan's line M1, were initially closed.

Lines 9, 15 and 19 have been closed entirely with the opening of M2 Metro line, and because of a number of decisions by the Sofia City Council.

In 2010, lines 2 and 19 were closed and line 18 was shortened, as part of the closure of the tram route through Borisovata Gradina to the Park-Hotel Moskva.

With the closure of Line 9 in 2012, the track from Hemus Hotel to Energoproekt was dismantled. In 2016, tram route 6 was changed, with the last two kilometers of the route from Spartak Swimming Pool to NDK being closed, which sparked numerous protests. The city council explained that the reason the route was changed was due the construction of the M3 Metro line, and even promised to add a trolleybus line next to the tram route, with the two coexisting together. However, the city council never returned the tram line, and the tracks from Hemus Hotel to the Spartak Pool in Zh.k. Lozenets were dismantled, and were replaced with a trolleybus route.

Lines 1 and 7, due to the construction of the metro, no longer run on the pedestrianized Vitoshka Boulevard, where the first tram in Sofia passed in 1901, causing congestion on Hristo Botev Boulevard and deterioration of the tracks.

== Depots and bases ==
The depots and bases for the storage, maintenance and operation of tram rolling stock are:

- Depot "Klokotnitsa" (former "Stanyo Vasilev") - First tram park - the first tram depot in Sofia, which was closed in 1999 after many years of operation.
- Depot "Krasno Selo" - reconstructed into the current tram factory "Tramkar", until its reconstruction - Second tram park.
- Depot "Banishora" (former "Penka Mihaylova") - Third tram park. Serves tram lines 6, 8, 10, 11, 12, 13 and 15.
- Depot "Krasna Polyana" (former " Shesti Septemvri") - Second tram park. Serves lines 1, 3, 4, 5, 7, 18 and 27.
- Depot "Iskar" - Fourth tram park - Built in the late 1980s for the new standard gauge lines (1435 mm). Serves lines 20, 21, 22 and 23.

== Unique features ==
A characteristic feature of the trams in Sofia was the mailbox built into the outer side of the tram, located next to the first door. All trams manufactured specifically for the needs of the Sofia public transport have such a box (the second-hand trams, as well as the Tatra T6B5, do not have such a box, as well as the new Pesa Swing 122NaSF, manufactured in 2013-2014). Letters from tram letterboxes are collected at several junction stops in the city centre and handed over to Central Post Office for processing.

== Routes and lines ==
As of 24 October 2026, the following lines operate:

№	Route	Notes
1	Ivan Vazov – NDK – Macedonia Square – Zapaden Park	
3	Station Sugar Factory – Konstantin Velichkov Metro Station – Sofia Central Station – Orlandovtsi	
4	Nikola Petkov blvd. ~~→~~ Krasno selo – Macedonia Square – Sofia Central Station – Orlandovtsi	
5	Knyazhevo ~~→~~ Buxton – Krasno selo – Macedonia Square ← Sofia Court House	
6	Ivan Vazov → National Palace of Culture – Macedonia Square – Sofia Central Station – Beli Dunav Metro Station ← Obelya	
7	Manastirski Livadi west → National Palace of Culture – Macedonia Square – Sofia Central Station ← Han Kubrat Metro Station	
8	Lyulin 5 → Macedonia Square ← Sofia Court House	
10	Zapaden Park → Macedonia Square – Srebarna str. ← Vitosha Metro Station	
11	Knyazhevo → Ovcha kupel Metro Station – Konstantin Velichkov Metro Station ← Iliyantsi	
12	Iliyantsi → Sofia Central Station – St. Nedelya Square ← Journalist Square	
13	Vitosha Metro Station → Macedonia Square → Konstantin Velichkov Metro Station ← Station Sugar Factory	
15	Vitosha Metro Station → Macedonia Square ← Buckstone	
18	Orlandovtsi → St. Nedelya Square ← Journalist Square	
20	Iskar Tram Depot → Poduyane railway station – Central Sofia Market Hall ← Opalchenska Metro Station	
21	Geo Milev – Poduyane railway station – Central Sofia Market Hall ← Opalchenska Metro Station	
22	East Bus station → Poduyane railway station – Konstantin Velichkov Metro Station ← Krasna polyana Depot	
23	Geo Milev – Iskarsko Shose – Obikolna Street	
27	Sofia Sever Station → Sofia Central Station – National Palace of Culture ← Manastirski Livadi West	
1,009 mm (3 ft 3 23/32 in) metre gauge (nominally) 1,435 mm (4 ft 8 1/2 in) standard gauge

== Rolling stock ==
Sofia has the following tram rolling stock:

Manufacturer and model	Quantity
Tramkar T8K-503 (bi-directional)	9
Tramkar T6M-700	22
Tramkar T8M-900M	8
ČKD Tatra T4DM/B4DM	5
ČKD Tatra T6A2/SF	57
Pesa Swing 122 NaSF	67
Tramkar / Inekon T8M-700 IT	18
ČKD Tatra T6B5	37
ČKD Tatra T6А5	47
Düwag GT8 (bi-directional)	5
Schindler Waggon AG Be 4/6	27

== Gallery ==
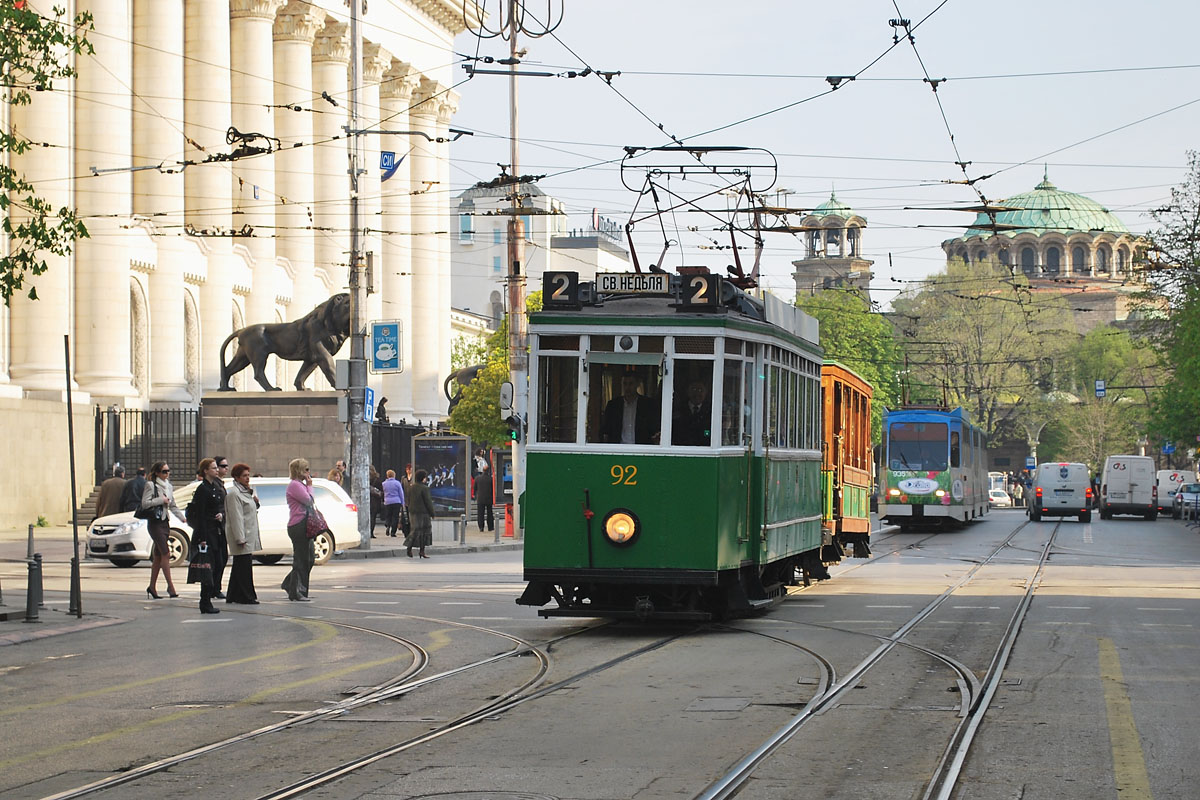
1935 Siemens heritage tram

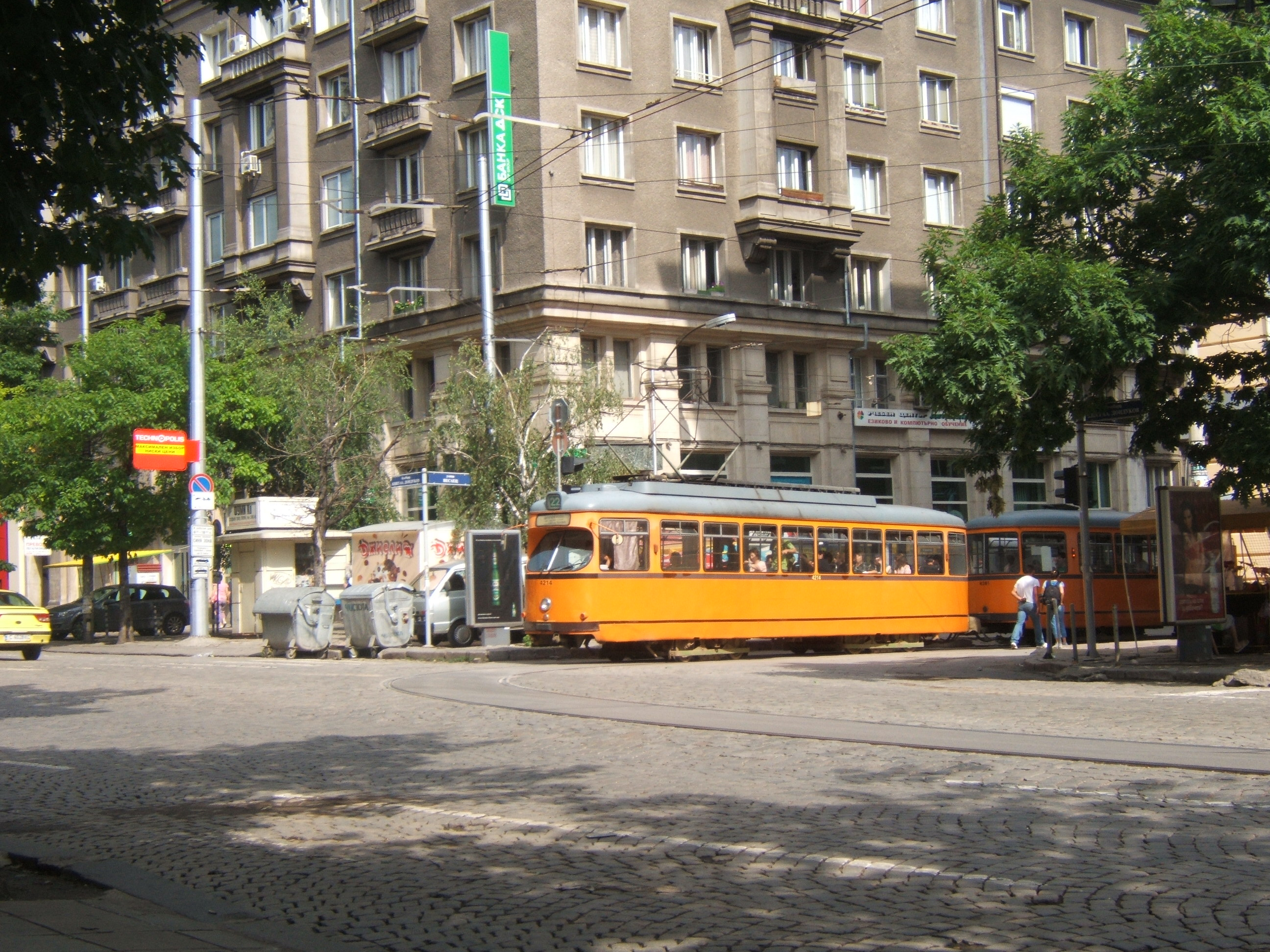
Duewag T4 - this tram type was in service between 1995 and 2017

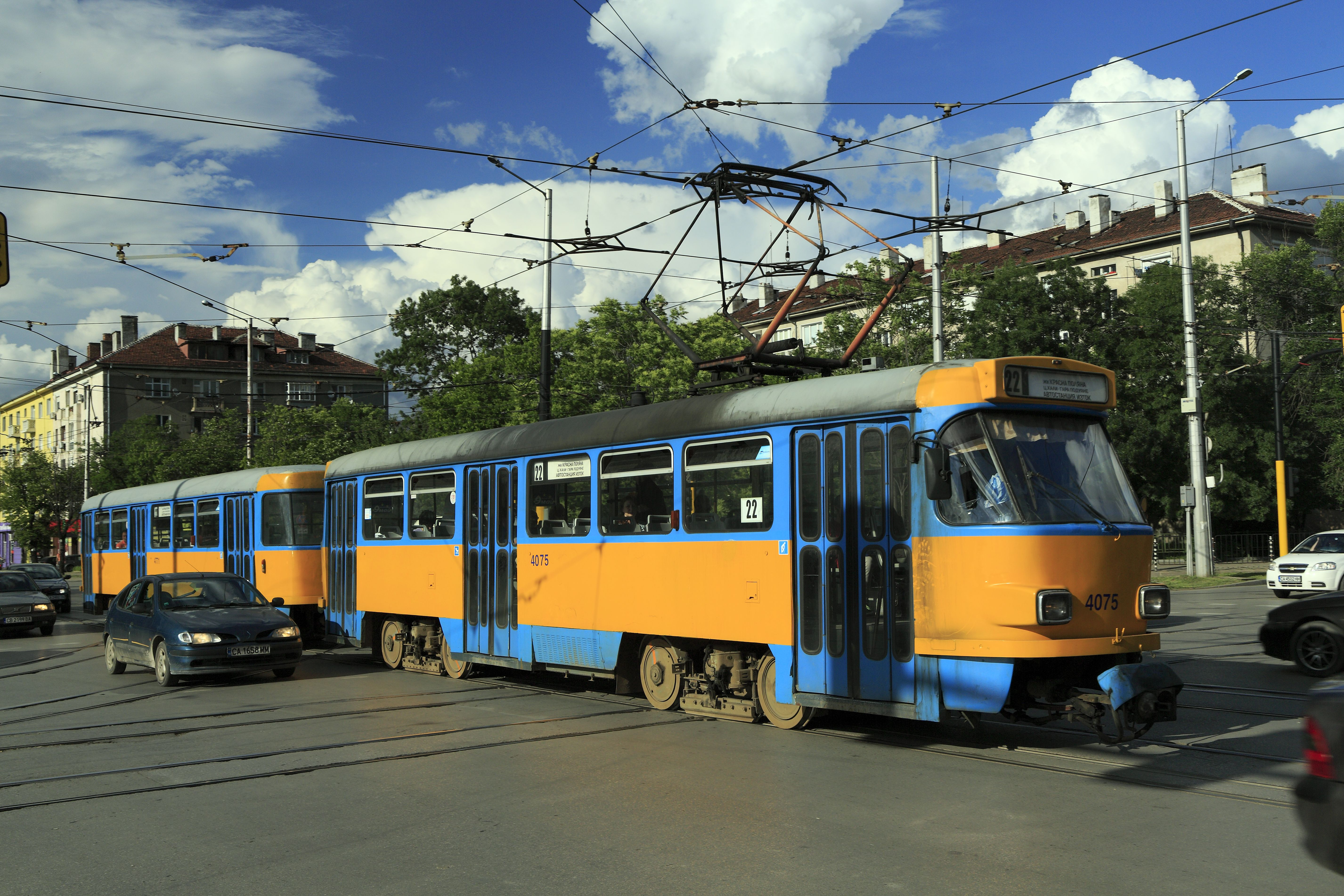
Tatra T4 tram in Sofia

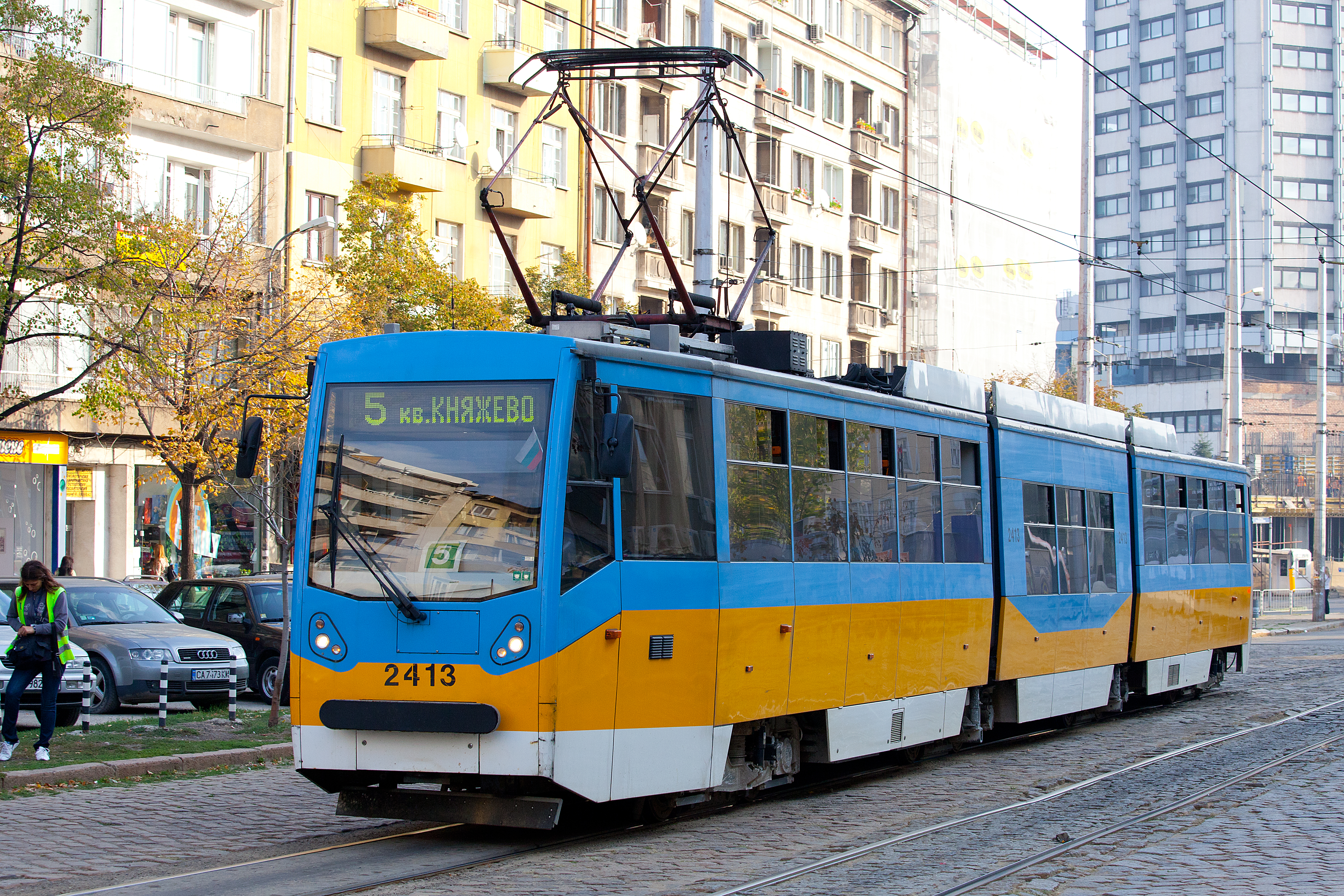
Inekon T8M-700IT

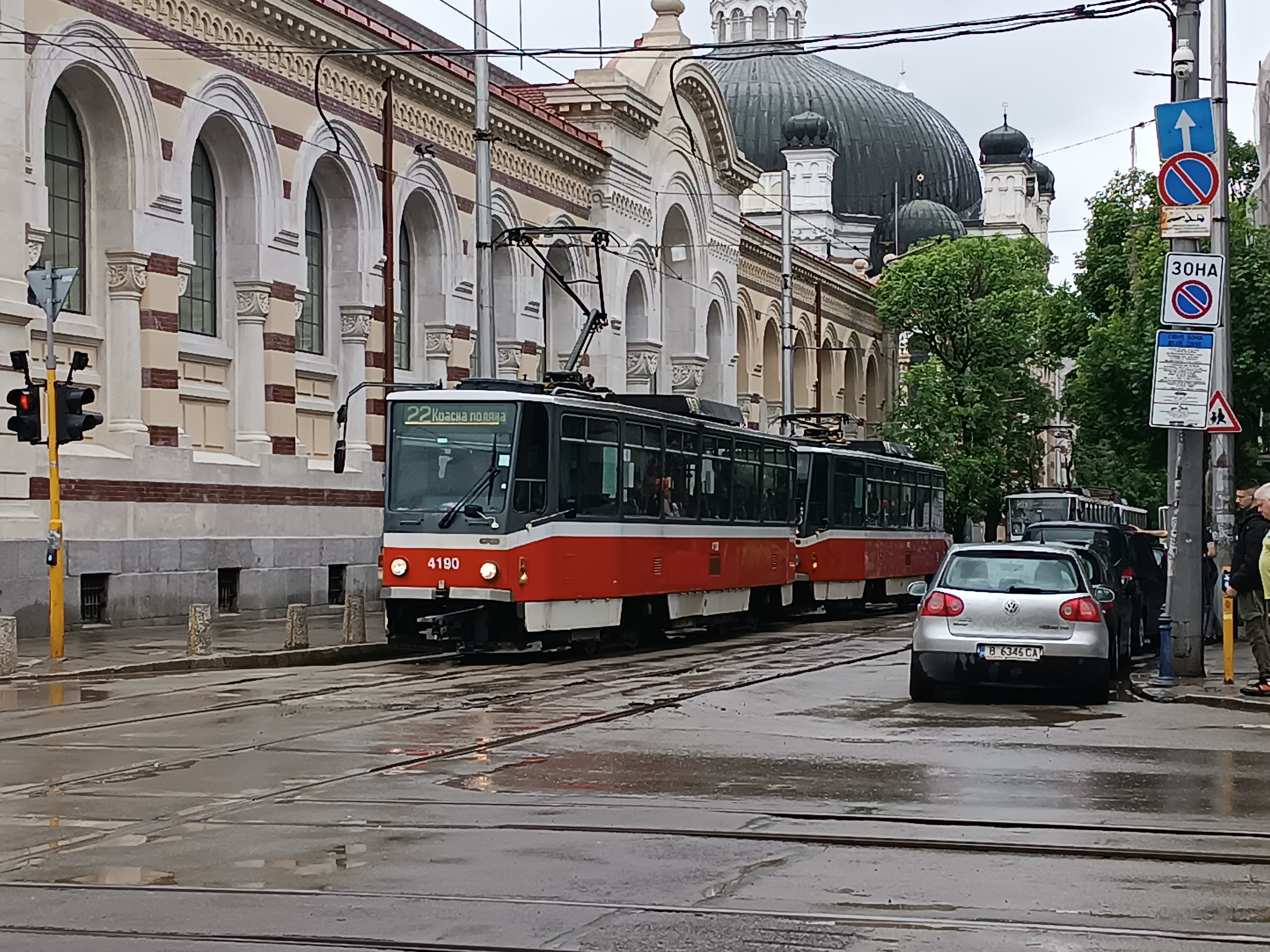
Former Prague tram, Tatra T6A5

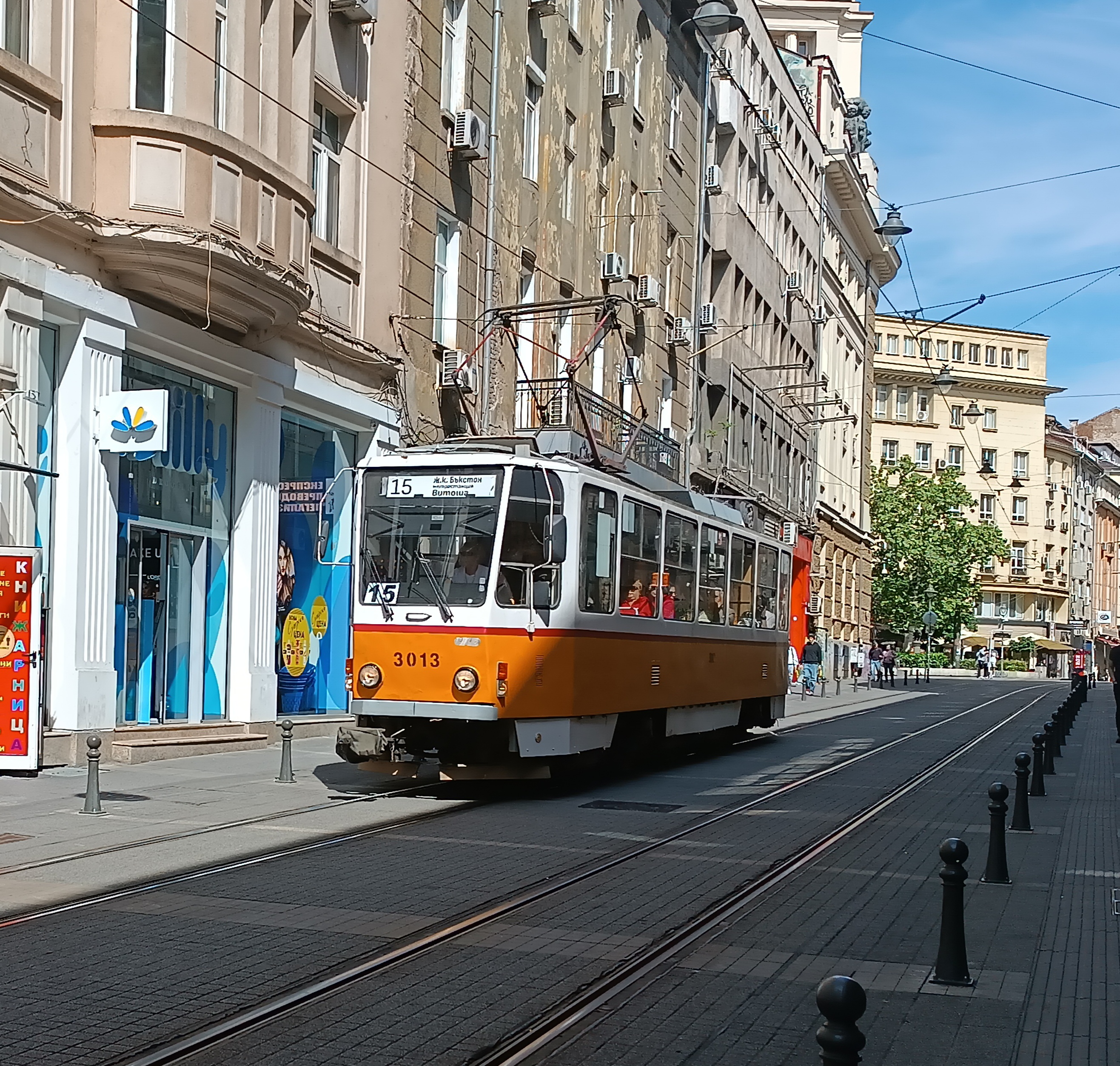
Tatra T6A2

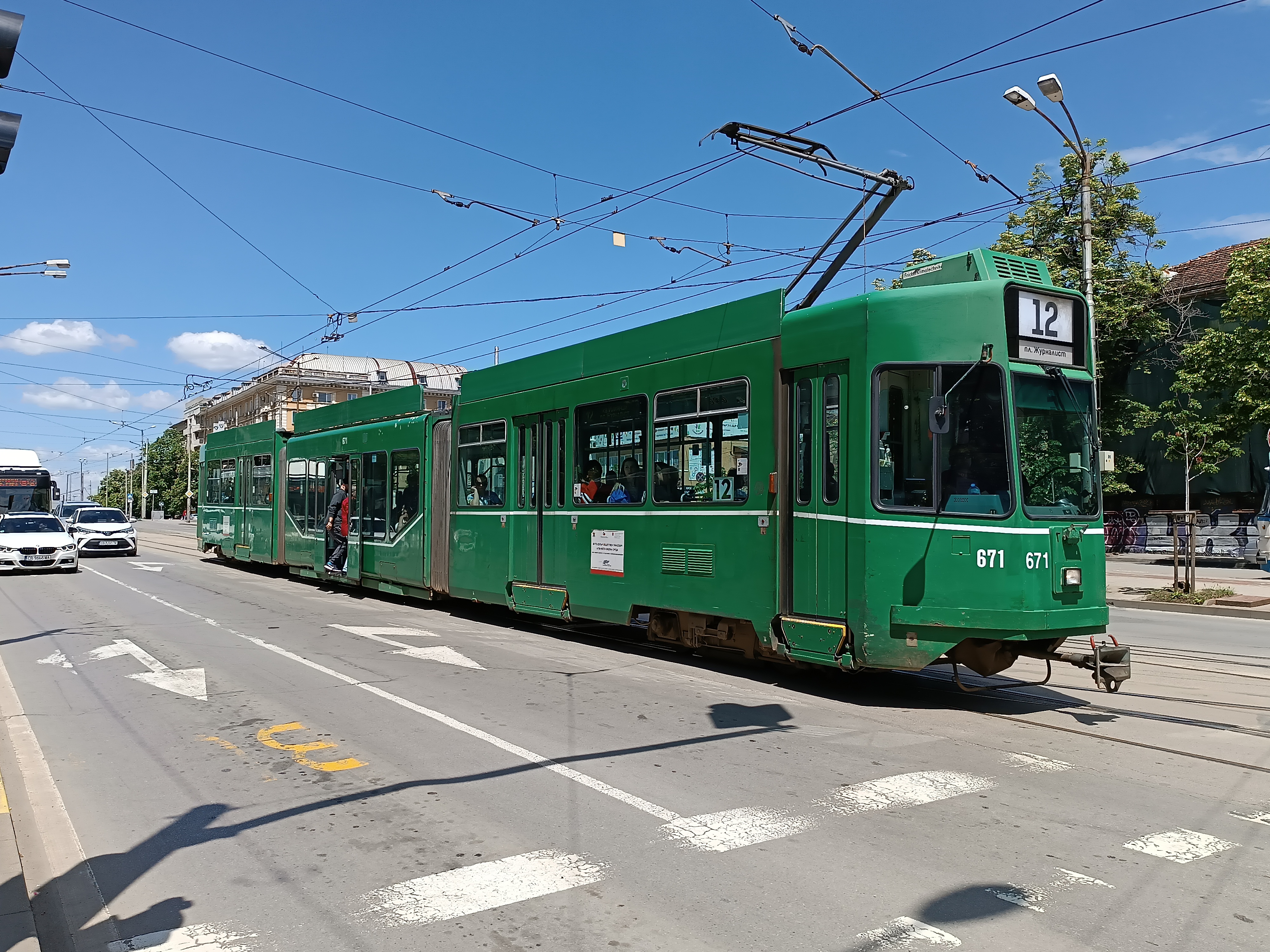
Schindler Siemens Be 4/6 from Basel

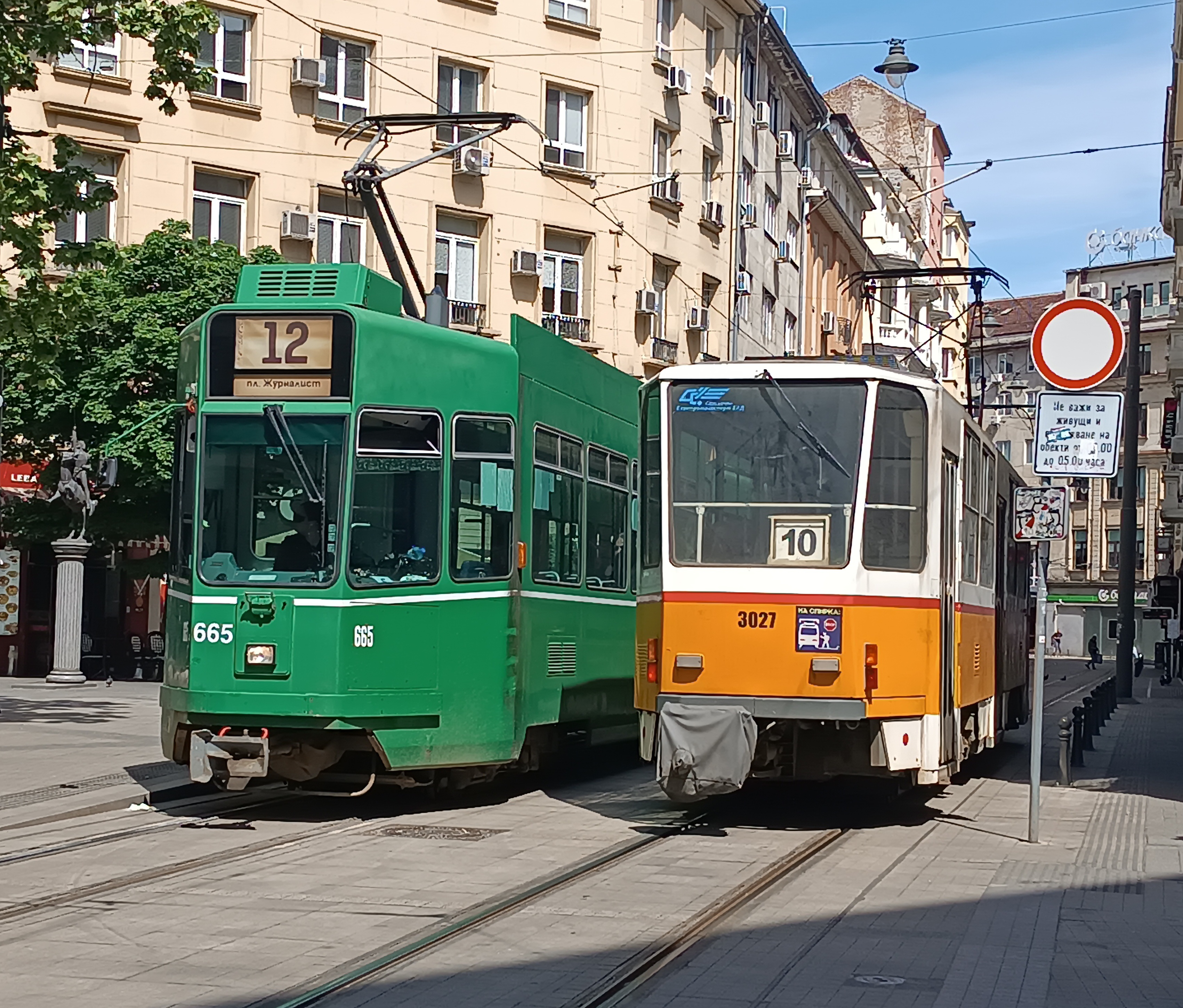
Schindler Siemens Be 4/6 and Tatra T6A2

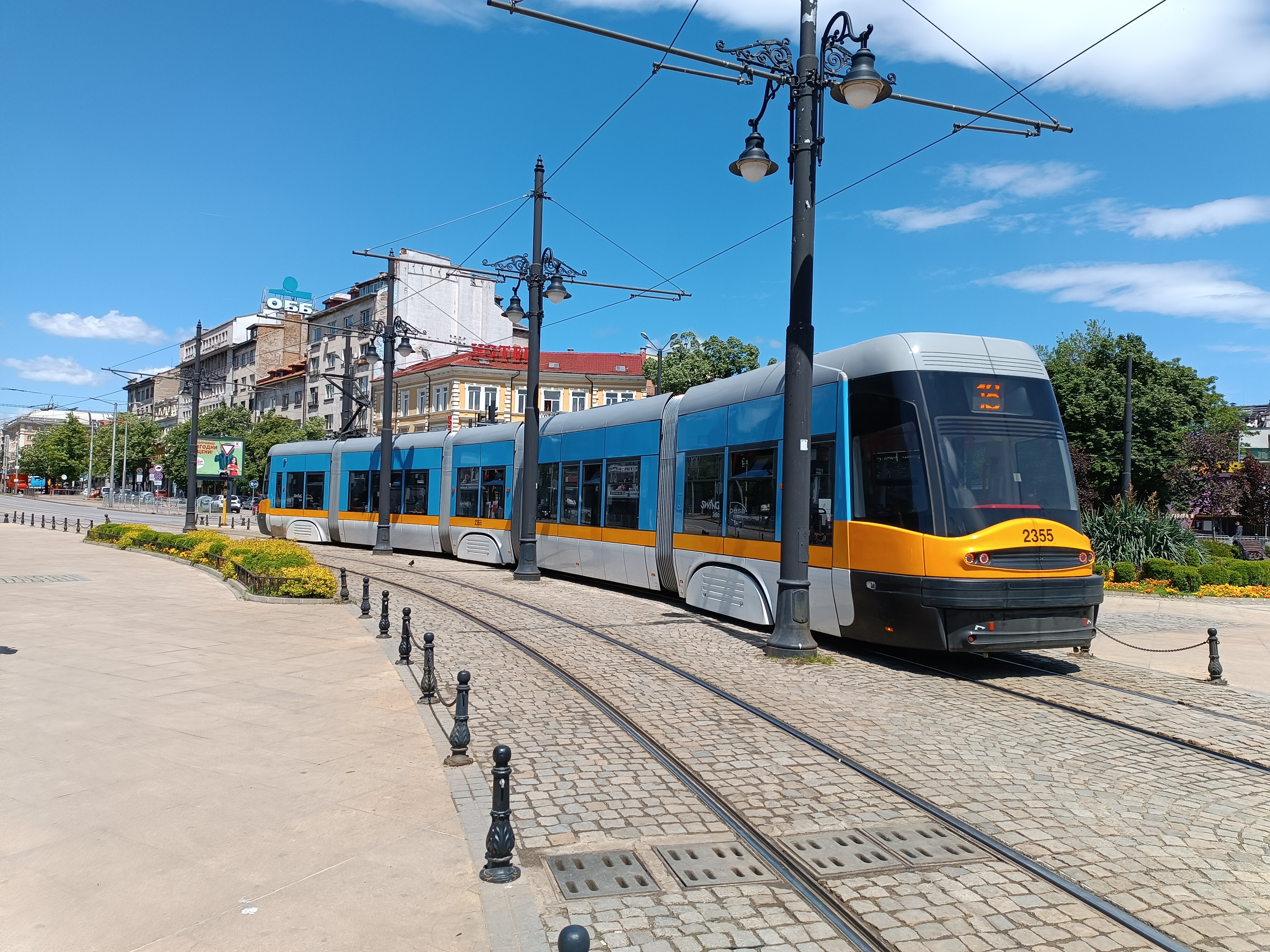
Pesa Swing

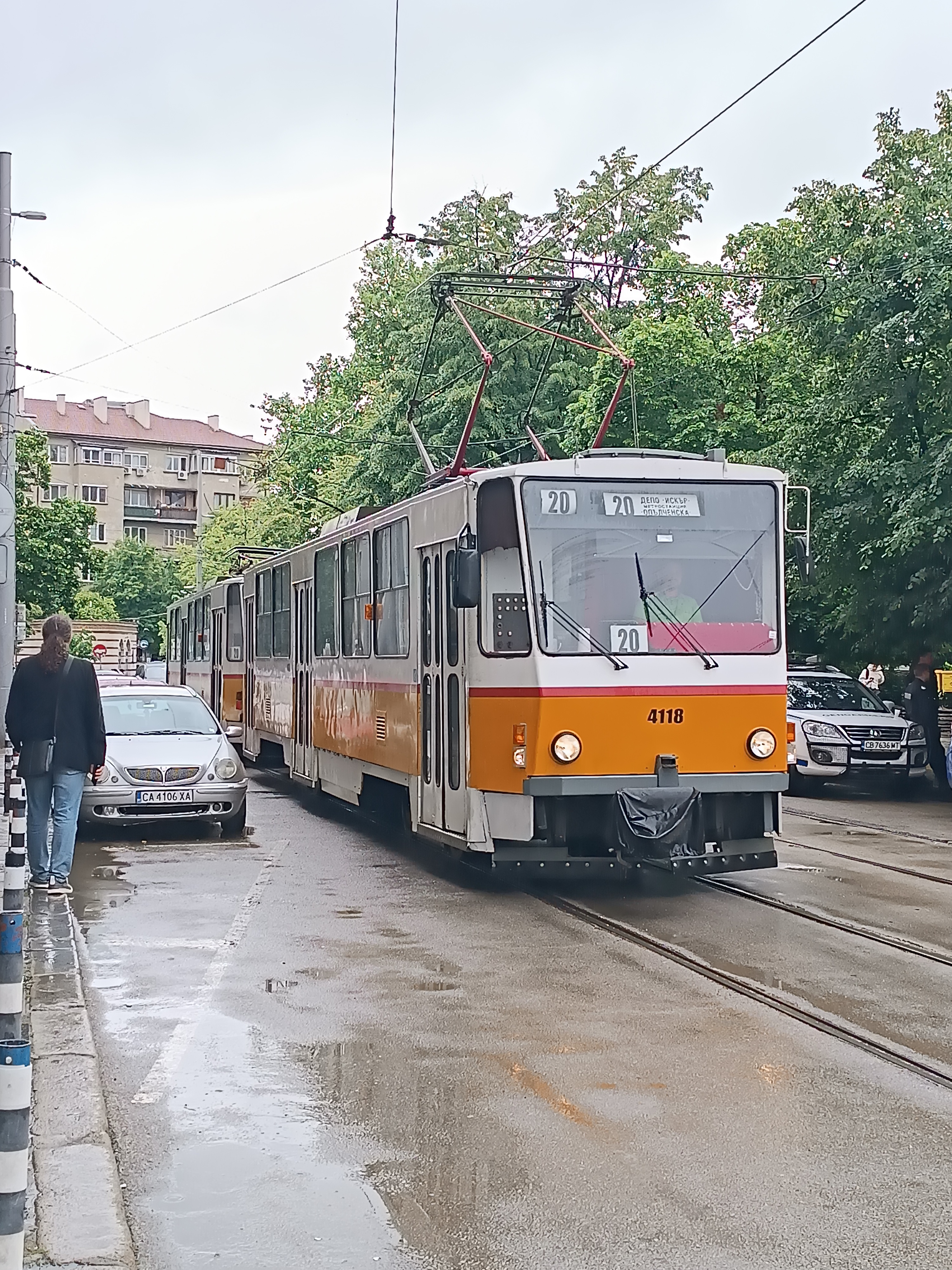
Tatra T6B5

== See also ==
- List of tram and light rail transit systems
- Sofia Metro
- Sofia Public Transport
- Trolleybuses in Sofia
