= Romania (train) =

International passenger train from Romania to Bulgaria

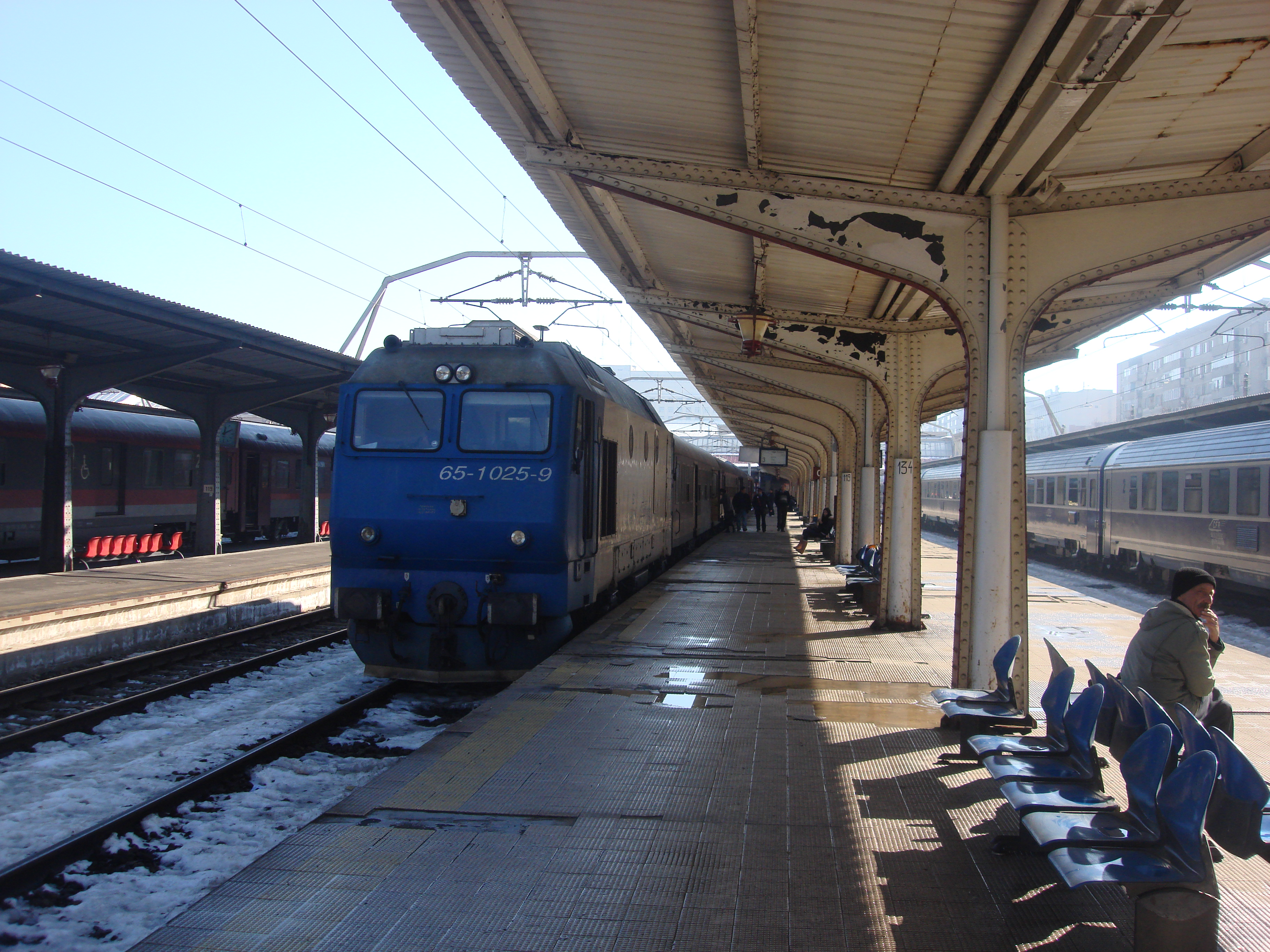
- Westbound train 461/465, together with the Bosphorus Express, waiting to depart Bucharest.

Overview
- Service type: Inter-city rail
- Status: Operating
- Locale: Southern Romania, northwest Bulgaria
- Current operators: Căile Ferate Române, Bulgarian State Railways

Route
- Termini: North station, Bucharest; Central station, Sofia
- Stops: 22
- Distance travelled: 297 km (185 mi)
- Average journey time: 9 hours, 40 minutes (westbound); 9 hours, 58 minutes (eastbound)
- Service frequency: Daily
- Train numbers: 461 (westbound); 460 (eastbound)

Technical
- Track gauge: 1,435 mm (4 ft 8 1/2 in)

Romania (Romanian: România, Bulgarian: Румъния, Rumŭniya) is an international passenger train running daily from Bucharest, Romania to Sofia, Bulgaria. During summer months, the train operates together with the Bosphorus Express from Bucharest to Gorna Oryahovica, where the latter heads southeast toward Istanbul, Turkey. Romania is operated by two national railway operators: Căile Ferate Române and the Bulgarian State Railways.

== Route description ==
The route of the Romania begins at North station in Bucharest. The joint Romania/Bosphorus Express departs the station at 12:45 EET and heads west along Route 900 until Videle, where it branches south and heads toward Giurgiu. At Giurgiu North station, border police board the train and conduct a passport and customs control. Afterwards, the train crosses the Danube river via the Danube Bridge and enters Ruse, Bulgaria. After an hour break at Central station in Ruse, the Romania heads southwest toward Gorna Oryahovica. The train travels across mostly flat farmland with some rolling hills; but is forced to run at relatively slow speeds due to the winding route of the railway. Scheduled arrival at Gorna Oryahovica is at 18:28, where the Bosphorus Express is decoupled. The Romania then continues west along flat farmland, north of the Balkan Mountains, arriving at Pleven at 19:38. The route then turns southwest and after Cherven Bryag, enters the western Balkan Mountains. The Romania traverses the winding route through the mountains, stopping at Mezdra and Svoge until exiting the mountain range near Novi Iskar, just north of Sofia. After a quick stop at Sofia North station, the Romania arrives at Sofia Central Station at 22:25.

== Track owners ==
The Romania runs on track owned by Căile Ferate Române (CFR) and the National Railway Infrastructure Company (NRIC).

- CFR Route 900, Bucharest to Videle
- CFR Route 902, Videle to Giurgiu
- CFR/NRIC Danube Bridge, Giurgiu to Ruse
- NRIC Ruse-Stara Zagora railway, Ruse to Gorna Oryahovica
- NRIC Sofia-Varna railway, Gorna Oryahovica to Sofia
