= National Transport Museum =

National Transport Museum may refer to:

- National Transport Museum of Ireland
- National Transport Museum, Bulgaria

== See also ==
- List of transport museums
