= Sofia Central Station =

Railway station in Sofia, Bulgaria

Sofia Central Station Централна гара София
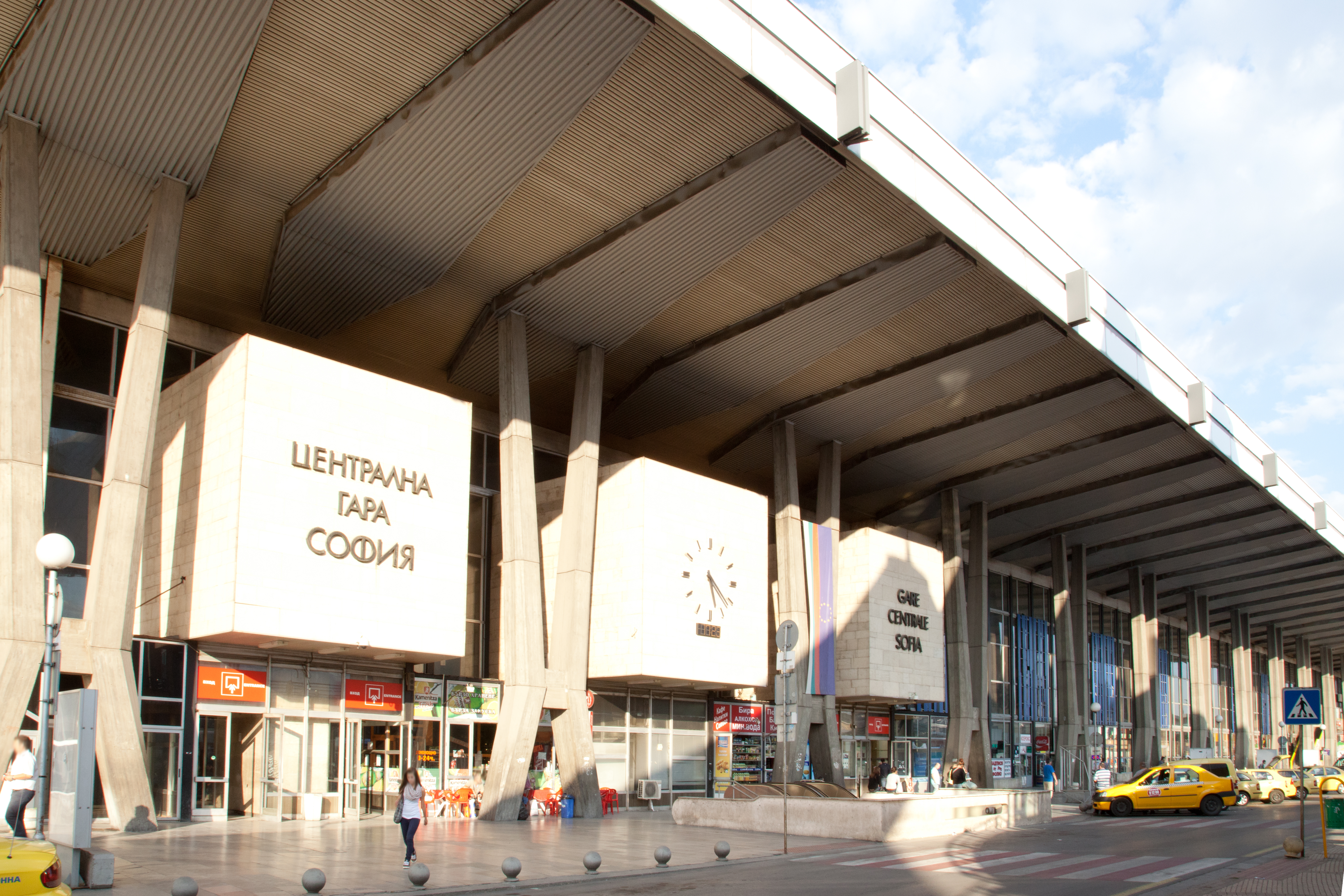
- Central Railway Station in Sofia, 2012

General information
- Location: 102 Knyaginya Maria Luiza Blvd. Sofia, Bulgaria
- Coordinates: 42°42′44″N 23°19′16″E
- Owner: NRIC
- Lines: Kalotina Zapad – Svilengrad Granitsa; Sofia – Varna; Iliyantsi – Varna Feribotna; Sofia – Kulata; Sofia – Gyueshevo
- Platforms: 6
- Tracks: 13
- Connections: Ruse, Stara Zagora, Burgas, Vidin, Yambol, Mezdra

Construction
- Structure type: At-grade
- Platform levels: 2
- Parking: Yes
- Cycle facilities: Yes

Other information
- Station code: SF (СФ)

History
- Opened: 1 August 1888
- Rebuilt: 6 September 1974
- Electrified: 27 April 1963

Services
Preceding station	BDŽ	Following station
Terminus	Istanbul-Sofia Express	Iskarsko Shose towards Istanbul
Terminus	Romania	Sofia Sever towards Bucharest
Terminus	Thessaloniki-Sofia Express	Zaharna Fabrika towards Thessaloniki
Terminus	Golden Sands	Mezdra towards Varna
Terminus	Yantra	Mezdra towards G. Orjahovica
Terminus	BDŽ Rapid	Poduyane towards Svilengrad
Location

The Sofia Central Railway Station (Bulgarian: Централна железопътна гара София, romanized: Tsentralna zhelezopatna gara Sofiya) is the main passenger railway station of Sofia, the capital of Bulgaria, as well as the largest railway station in the country. It is located 1 km north of the city centre after Lavov most, on Marie Louise Boulevard in the immediate proximity of the Central Bus Station Sofia. It was completely renovated in 2016.

== History ==
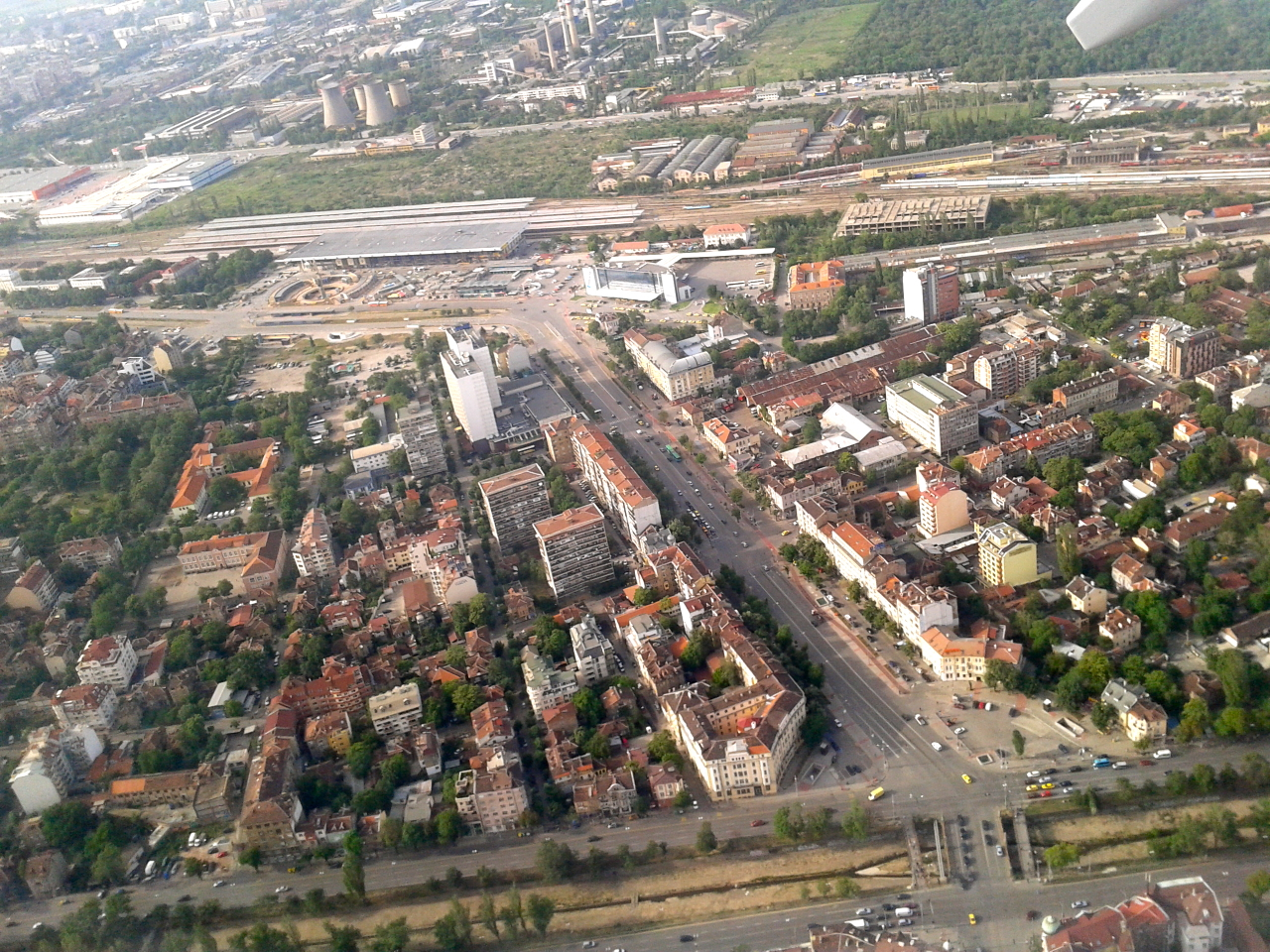
Aerial view of the Main Train Station and the Central Bus Station in Sofia

The old building of the Central Railway Station completed in 1888

The original building of the Sofia Railway Station was opened on 1 August 1888 to serve the Tsaribrod-Sofia-Vakarel line, the first line of the Bulgarian State Railways entirely built by Bulgarian engineers. The building was designed by the architects Antonín Kolář, Václav Prošek and Marinov, and built with the participation of Italian specialists under Bulgarian undertaker Ivan Grozev between 1882 and 1888. It was a one-storey building, 96 m long and 12 m wide, featuring a small clock tower looking towards Vitosha on the façade and a second storey in the western and eastern part. The first station master was Yosif Karapirov. The Sofia Railway Station was renovated and expanded several times.

Due to the construction of additional rail stations in sofia, including the Poduyane Railway Station to the east, in 1948 the Sofia Railway Station was renamed to the Central Train Station.

The railway station was chosen to be one of 30 buildings that would be renovated, rebuilt or constructed as part of the 30 year celebration since the 1944 Bulgarian coup d'état.

The new building was constructed in the place of the 1888 station's plaza and garden areas, in order not to interrupt its operations during the construction efforts. Despite the lack of interference between the new and old building, the old terminal was slated to be demolished once the new station was near, or fully operational.

The new terminal was designed by the Transproekt company under lead architect Milko Bechev. It included 365 premises placed around two underground and three overground levels. The building made heavy use of white marble.

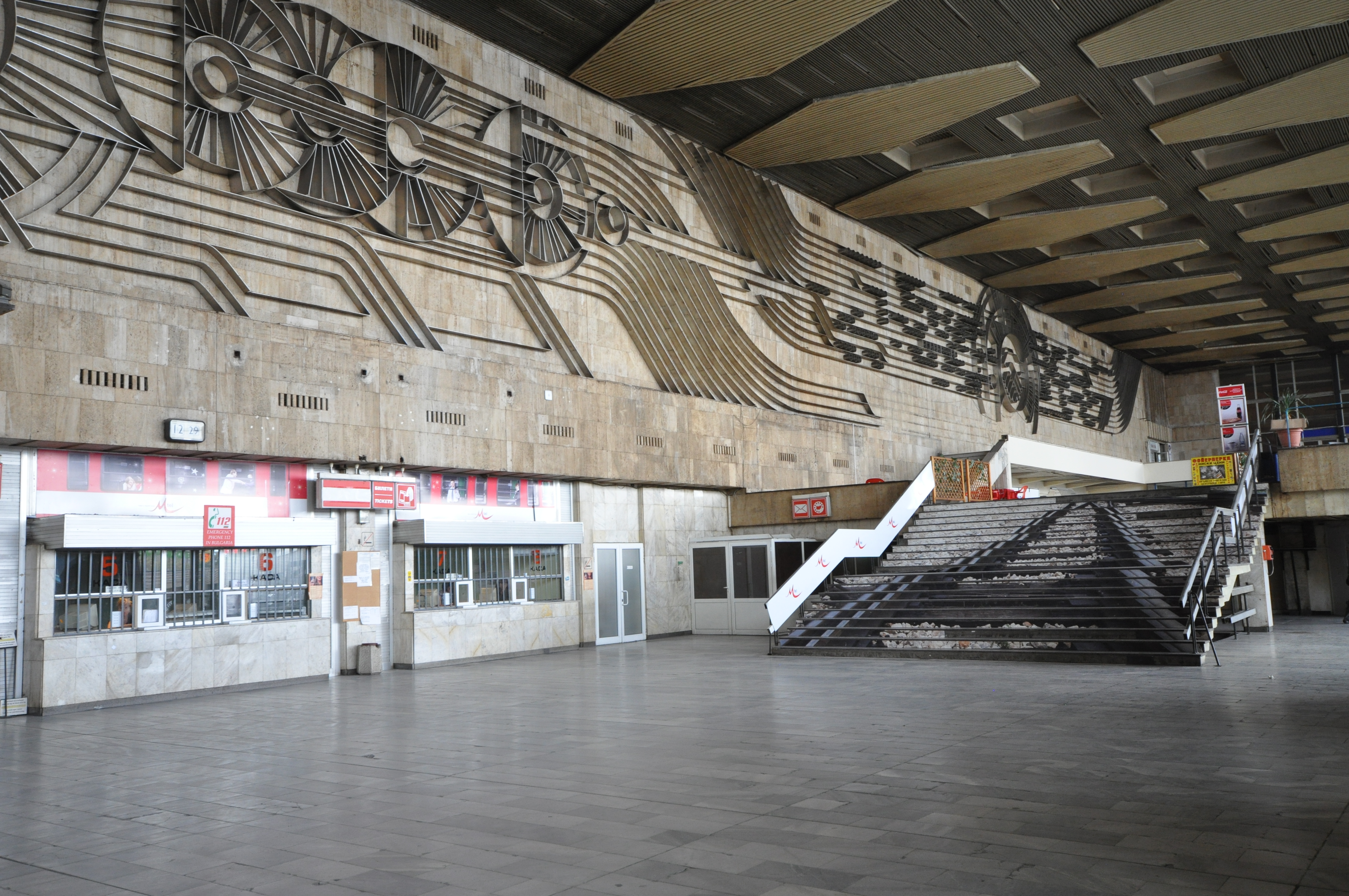
The lobby of the 1974 Building in 2012

Construction of the new building started on 23 February 1971. Grigor Stoichkov, who was the minister of transport of Bulgaria, was present at the event and ceremonially broke ground on the new project.

On 15 April 1974, the old building was completely demolished in order to make way for the new rail terminal, which was slated to be opened with a ceremony on 6 September of the same year.

In a ceremony attended by the country's elite, the station was inaugurated on 6 September 1974, with Zhivkov, the country's de facto ruler being present to cut the ribbon.

In 2002, the station and the area in front of it saw major renovations, with many more shops being built in the viscinity of the building. In addition to the interior being modernized, tensile elements of an area of 4,500 m^{2} were added to the surroundings of the statue in front of the station building. the project cost about 20 million levs. (~10 million euro)

In 2012, it was announced that the aging railway station would see a major overhaul, slated to be finished by 2014, but eventually delayed to 2016. This reconstruction effort aimed to only to modernize the platform sheds, platforms and the station itself, ignoring the surrounding parts of the complex which included infrastructure such as the numerous underpasses, elevators, underground car parking and the plaza of the statue located immediately outside the building's entrance. The renovations cost about 56 Million leva (~28.6 million euro).

The post-renovation interior of Sofia Central Station in 2016.

The reason for this was that the station and the platforms were the property of the NRIC, whereas the rest of the structures surrounding it are controlled by Sofia Municipality. As a consequence, many of the structures that were once built in association with the railway station, such as the plaza and underpasses have fallen into disrepair.

== International destinations ==
The following international destinations can be reached directly from Sofia Railway Station

- Belgrade (Stopped due to COVID-19)
- Bucharest
- Craiova
- Istanbul
- Niš (Stopped due to COVID-19)
- Thessaloniki (Stopped due to COVID-19)

== Transport ==
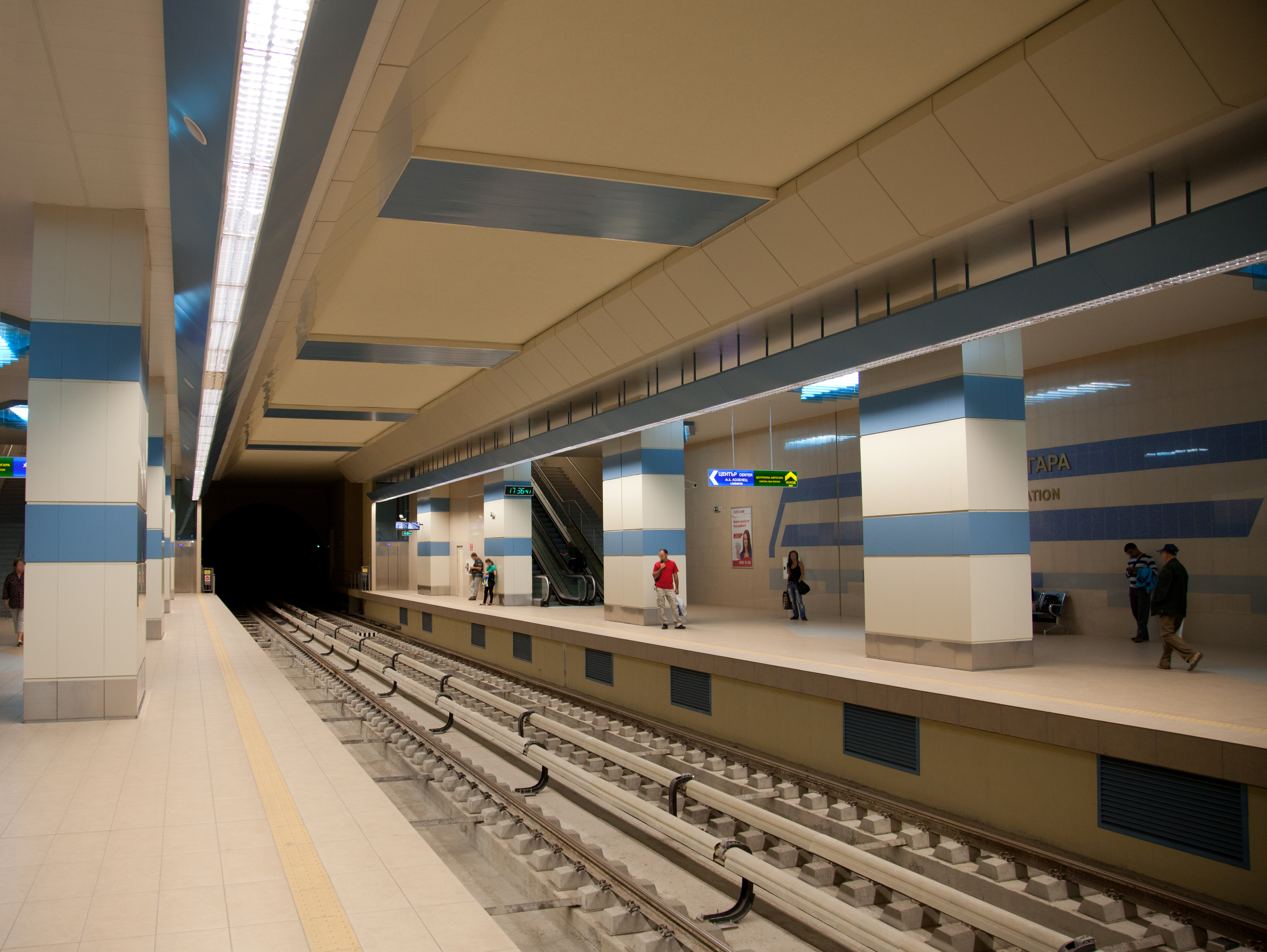
"Central Railway Station" Station on the Sofia Metro

=== Metro ===
Central Railway Metro Station of the Sofia Metro is located under the boulevard adjacent to the railway station. The entrances of the Metro Station are located on the underpasses of the rail station, and central Bus Station. This stop is part of the M2 (Blue) line.

=== Bus lines ===
- Bus service: lines 60, 74, 77, 78, 82, 85, 101, 213, 285, 305, 404, 413

=== Tram lines ===
- Tram service: 1, 3, 6, 7, 10

=== Night lines ===
- Night Bus service: Line N2

=== Parking ===
There is a parking facility in the immediate viscinity of the train station called Serdika bus station underground garage. It is part of the Serdika bus station complex, which has been occasionally confused with the nearby Central Bus Station.

== See also ==
- Central Bus Station Sofia
- Trams in Sofia
- Trolleybuses in Sofia
- Public buses in Sofia
- Sofia Public Transport
