= NRIC =

NRIC may refer to:

- National Railway Infrastructure Company, Bulgaria's state-owned railway infrastructure company
- National Reactor Innovation Center at the Idaho National Laboratory
- National Registration Identity Card, the identity document in Singapore
- Malaysian identity card, the identity document of Malaysia also known as National Registration Identity Card
