= Trolleybuses in Ruse =

Bulgarian public transit system

Coordinates: 43°51′N 25°58′E

Ruse trolleybus system
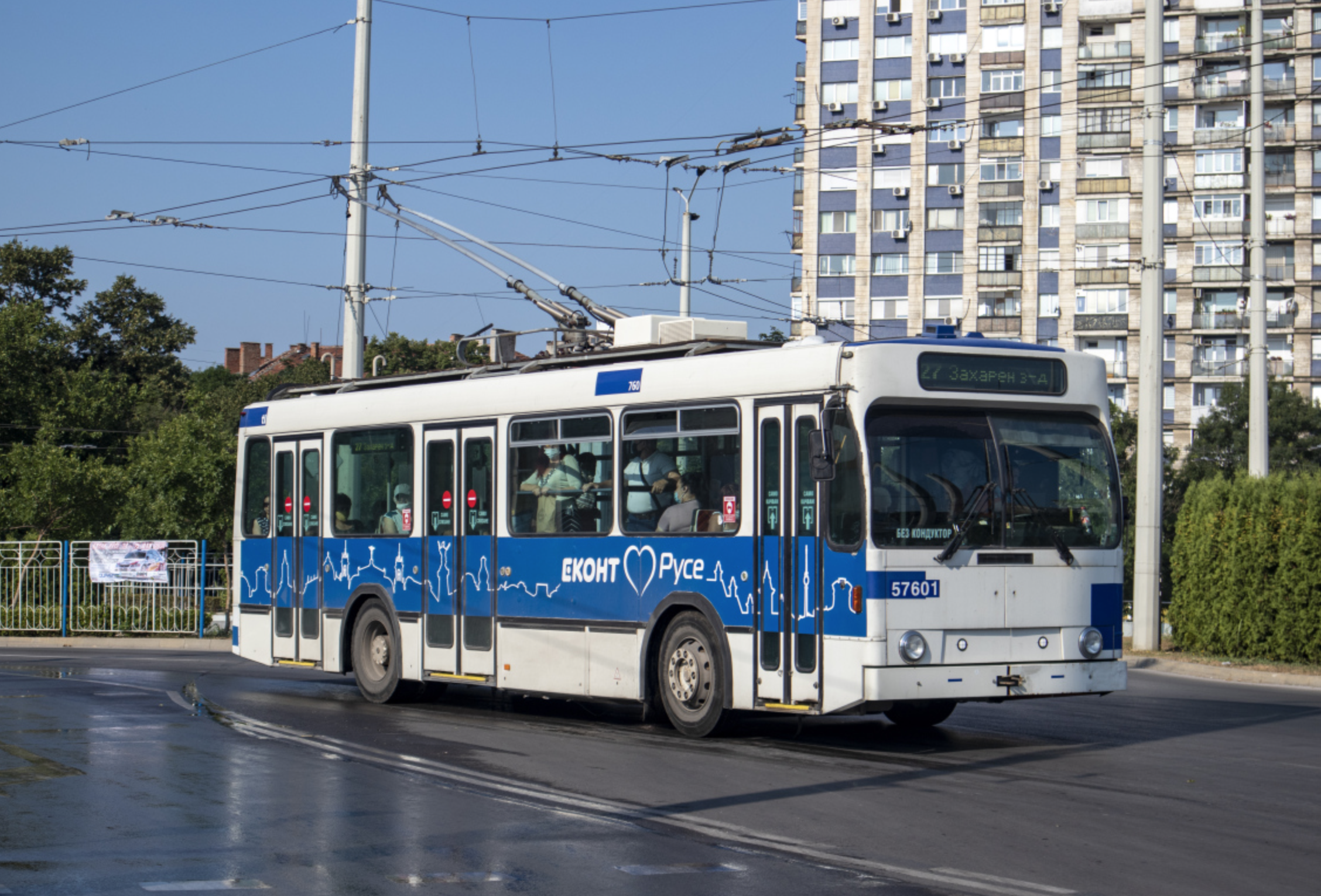
- NAW trolleybus operating in Ruse, Bulgaria.

Operation
- Locale: Ruse, Bulgaria
- Open: 9 September 1988
- Status: Open
- Routes: 7
- Operators: Общински Транспорт Русе АД (Municipal Transport Ruse AD)

Infrastructure
- Electrification: 600 V DC
- Depot: 1
- Stock: 37 trolleybuses

Statistics
- Track length (total): 63 km (39 mi)
Overview
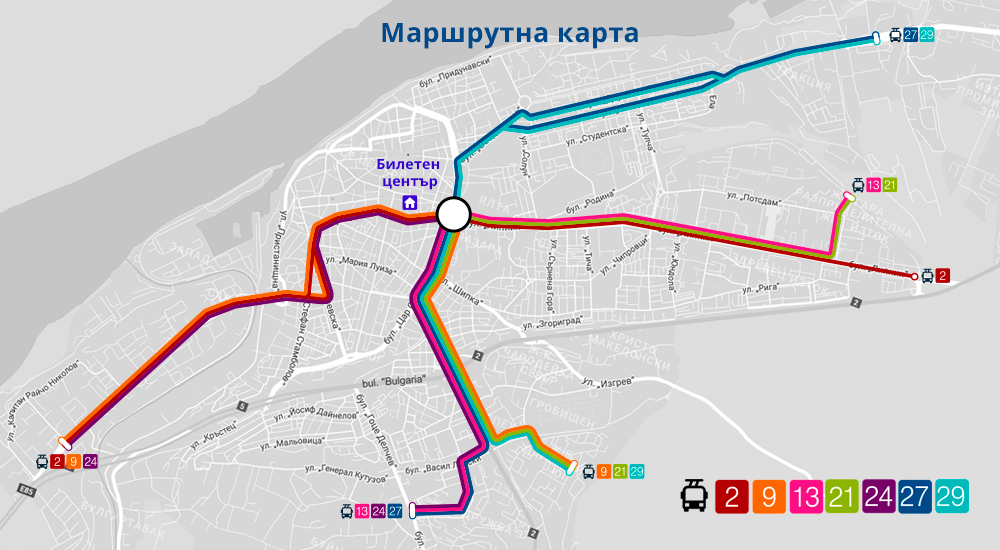
- Website: http://www.transport-ruse.com Municipal Transport Ruse (in English)

The Ruse trolleybus system (Bulgarian: Русенски тролейбусен транспорт) is a part of the public transport network of the city and municipality of Ruse, the fifth most populous in Bulgaria. Opened in 1988, the system currently has seven lines and forms the backbone of the city's transport system. Its approximate length is 63 km and has been designed to work with 600V DC electricity, although not all infrastructure is actively in use. Various models of trolleybuses have been operated in Ruse during the network's operation.

== History ==
=== Initial years ===
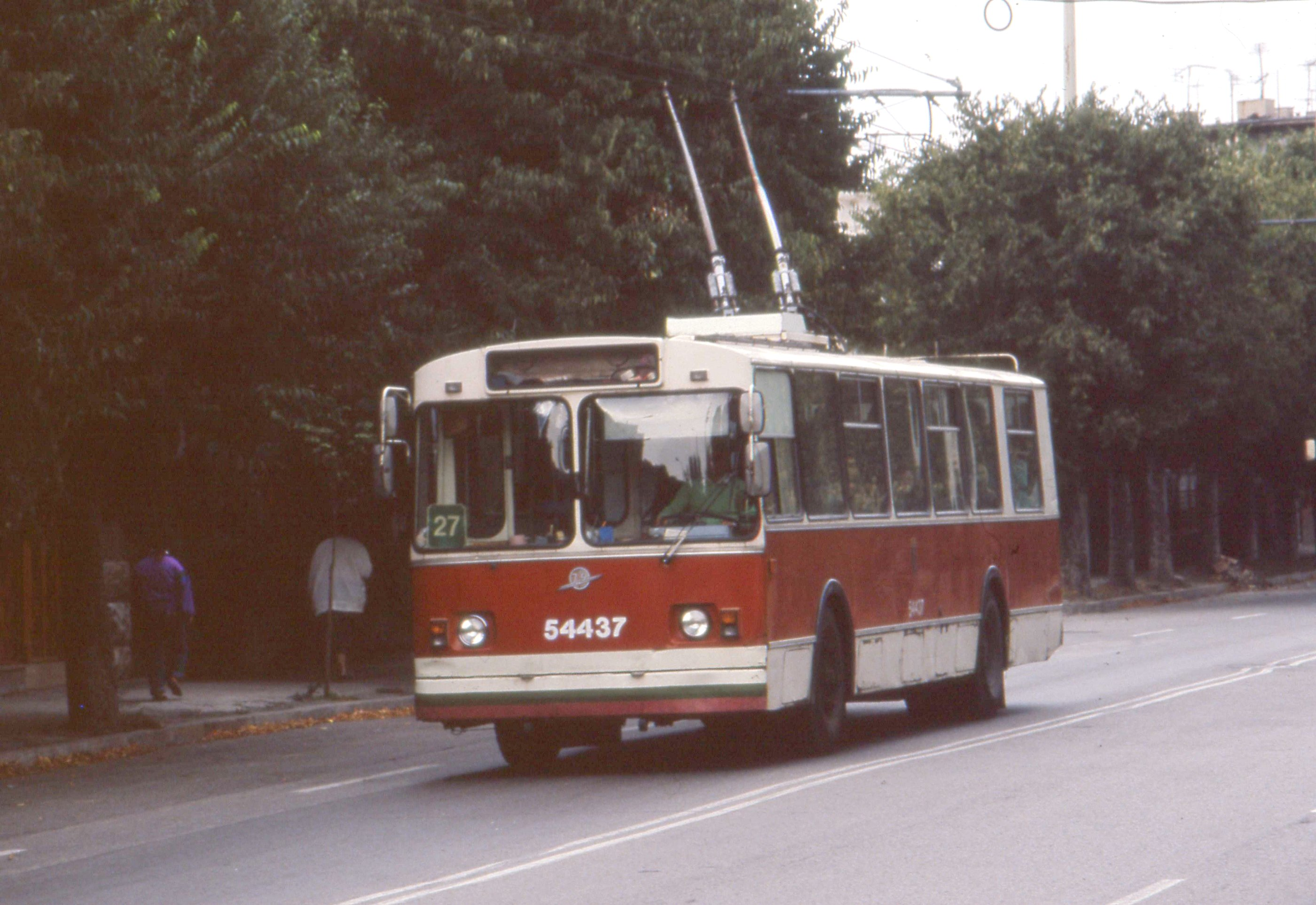
A ZiU-9 trolleybus operating on route 27 in 1993

The first trolleybus in the city of Ruse departed in 1988, along the route starting from the Western Industrial Zone. Lines were operated solely using ZiU trolleybuses. Although it was a new trolleybus system built in difficult times of economic stagnation, which worsened after the fall of the communist regime in the country, the network managed to branch out. Trolleybuses offered reliable transport connections in the busiest transport directions, replacing many bus routes. Retired trolleybuses from the Swiss cities of Basel, Bern, and Winterthur were introduced to the network in the late 1990s.

=== Private holding ===
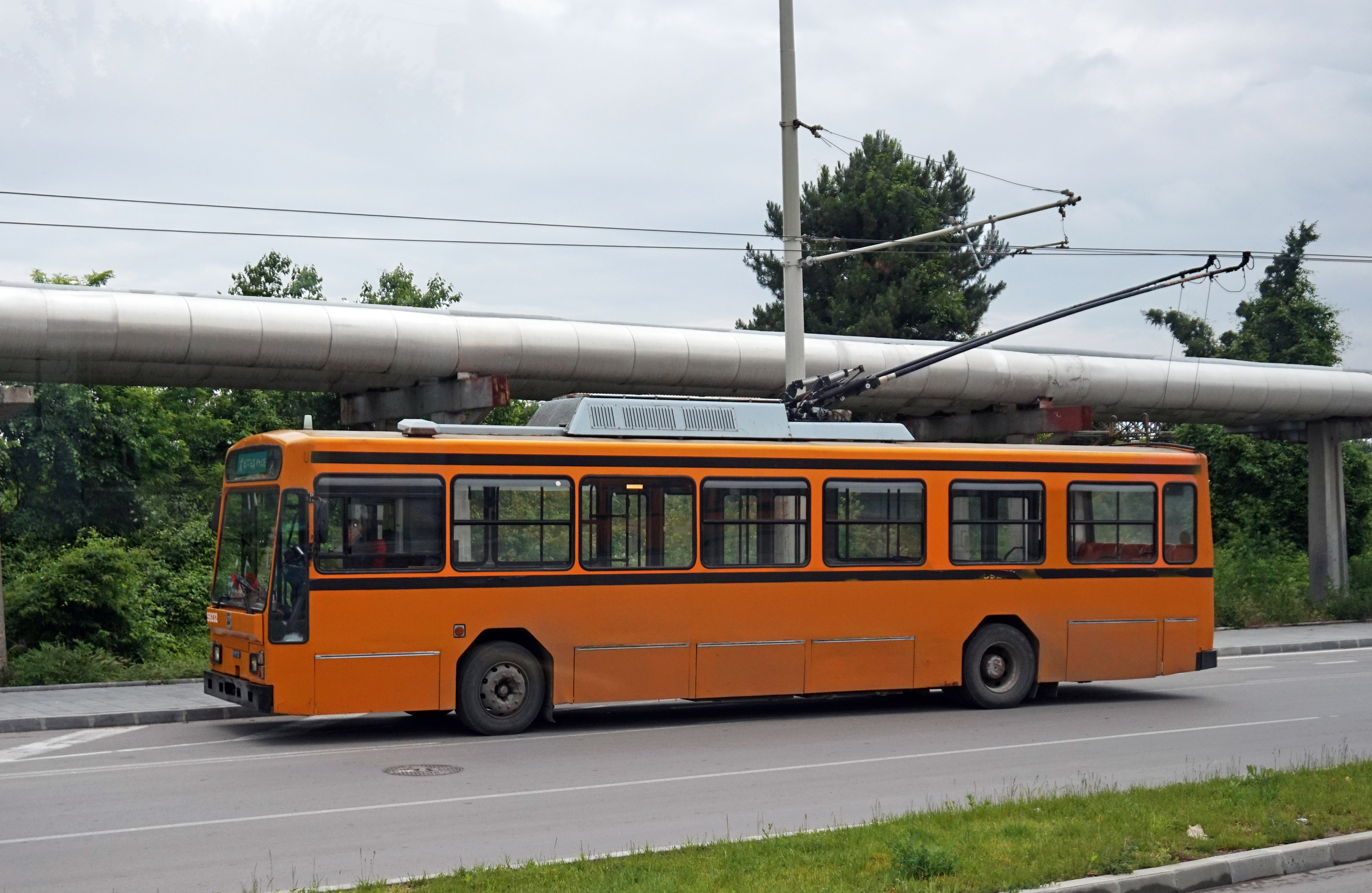
Iveco Socimi trolleybus operating on Tutrakan Blvd. in 2016

It was announced on November 1, 2008 that Ruse municipality had signed a concession agreement with the Bulgarian branch of the Israeli transport company Egged. Under the concession, management of trolleybus operations within the city became the responsibility of the private Egged Ruse transport holding.

The entire stock of vehicles, consisting of Soviet built ZiU and former Swiss trolleybuses, was replaced in several stages between 2008 and 2013 with vehicles in used condition from various European countries. Investment was reported at 2 million euro. The local municipality financed the replacement of around 70% of the overhead wire network under the integrated urban transport project. Repairs also included the repainting and replacement of damaged trolleybus pillars.

During this period, conductor service was discontinued for all trolleybus lines as a permanent cost-cutting measure. Passengers instead purchase subscription and prepaid cards or a single-use ticket directly from the driver. After nearly nine years of operating under a private holding and low overall profitability, the trolleybus transport entity was transferred back to the local municipality on August 31, 2017.

=== Municipal transport ===
Following the local municipality's reacquisition of the transport holding, a significant number of the aging vehicles in the transit fleet have been decommissioned. However, investments in additional trolleybuses in used condition continued in order to ensure the operation of the transport system. Deliveries occurred in multiple tranches between 2019 and 2022.

New overhead switches equipped with automatic remote control functionality have been installed throughout the city in order to replace outdated infrastructure and enhance trolleybus performance. Ruse received 15 modern trolleybuses from Czech manufacturer SOR Libchavy in 2023.

== Services ==
Today, the Ruse trolleybus network has 7 lines:

Line	Route	Stops
2	"Treti Mart" Blvrd. – "Sent Uan" Str. – "Nikolaevska" Str. – "Skobelev" Blvrd. – "Lipnik" Blvrd.	15 stops
9	Charodeyka South-Residential District – "Hristo Botev" Blvrd – "Stefan Stambolov" Str. – "Treti Mart" Blvrd.	12/13 stops
13	Druzhba 3 Residential District – "Dame Gruev" Str. – "Tsar Osvoboditel" Blvrd. - "Lipnik" Blvrd. – Ruse Sorting yard.	14 stops
21	Charodeyka South-Residential District – "Tsar Osvoboditel" Blvrd. – "Lipnik" Blvrd. – Ruse Sorting yard.	13 stops
24	Druzhba 3 Residential District – "Tsar Osvoboditel" Blvrd – "Skobelev" Blvrd. – "Treti Mart" Blvrd.	13/14 stops
27	Druzhba 3 Residential District – "Hristo Botev" Blvrd. – "Syedinenie" Blvrd. – "Tutrakan" Blvrd.	15 stops
29	Charodeyka South-Residential District – "Hristo Botev" Blvrd. – "Syedinenie" Blvrd. – "Pliska" Str. – "Tutrakan" Blvrd.	14 stops

== Fleet ==
=== Current fleet ===
Trolleybus transport in Ruse operates SOR TNS 12, alongside used NAW/Lauber 91T vehicles.

In service	Manufacturer	Type	Model	Low-floor	Built	Remarks
15 units	SOR Libchavy	TNS 12	rigid	yes	2023	Hybrid trolleybuses
22 units	NAW/Lauber	91T	rigid	no	1986–1990	ex-Lausanne.

=== Past fleet ===
Quantity	Manufacturer	Type	Model	Low-floor	Built	Remarks
56 units	ZiU	ZiU-9	rigid	no	1988–1990	Soviet-built vehicles.
5 units	ZiU	ZiU-10	articulated	no	1989	Soviet-built vehicles.
6 units	Berna	4GTP	articulated	no	1965–1969	ex-Basel and Winterthur
4 units	FBW	Tr51	rigid	no	1956	ex-Basel
6 units	FBW	GTr51	articulated	no	1961	ex-Bern
29 units	Iveco	2470 Socimi	rigid	no	1983–1984	ex-Milan. 1 vehicle donated to Ruse University.
2 units	Skoda Electric	14Tr	rigid	no	1989	ex-Plzeň. Training vehicle retired in June 2022.
7 units	Neoplan	N6021	articulated	yes	1995–1996	ex-Basel
2 units	Mercedes-Benz	O405GTD	articulated	no	1990	ex-Esslingen
8 units	FBW/Hess	91T	rigid	no	1982–1983	ex-Lausanne. Retired 2022. 2 units scrapped.
8 units	Renault	ER100H	rigid	no	1989	ex-Limoges. Retired 2022. 2 units scrapped.
12 units	Skoda Electric	21TrACI	rigid	no	2001–2003	ex-Plzeň. Retired 2023.

== See also ==
- Ruse Central railway station
- List of trolleybus systems
