= Bulgarian State Railways locomotives 142–150 =

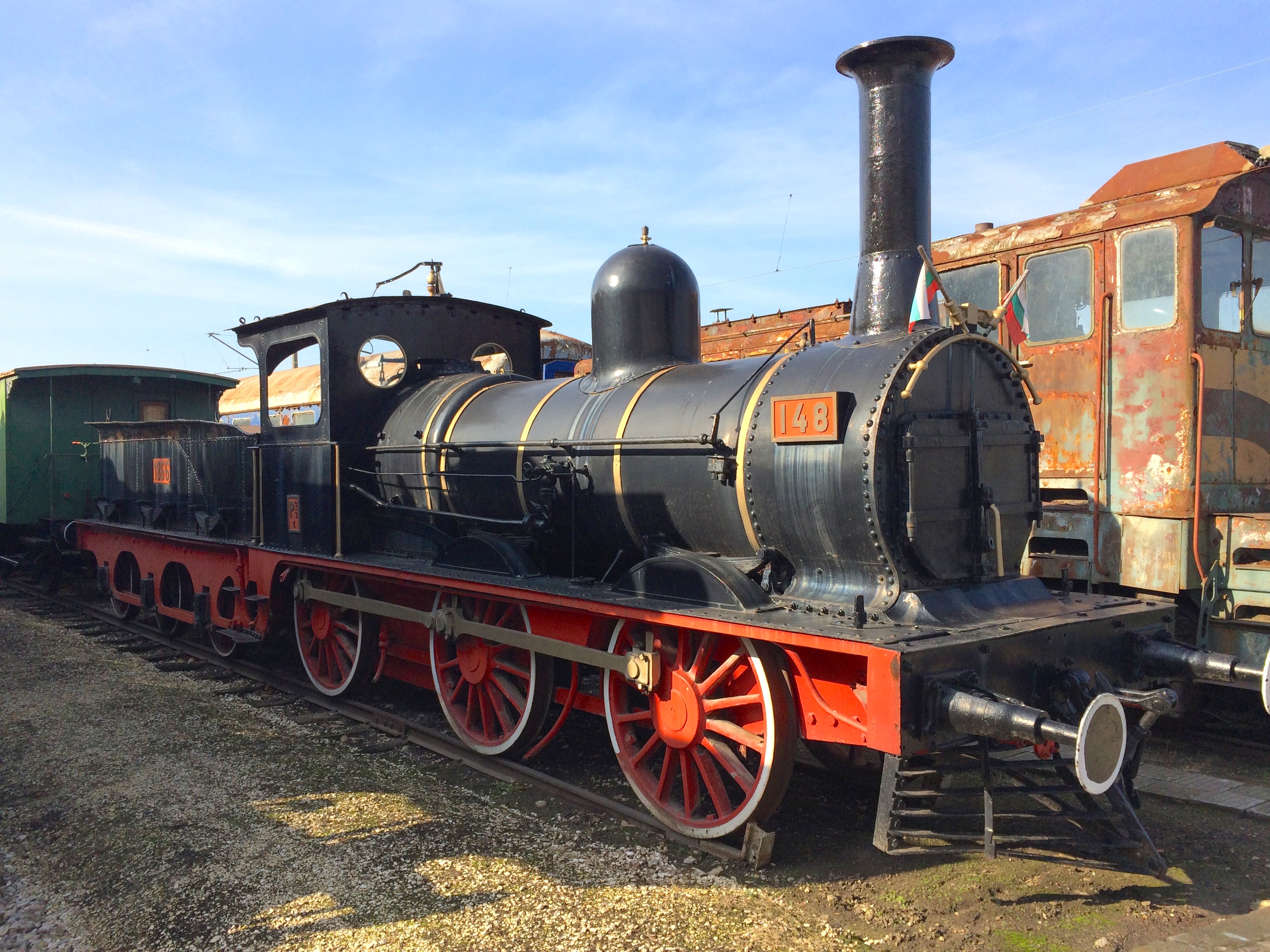
Locomotive 148 preserved in the Bulgarian National Transport Museum at Ruse.

Bulgarian State Railways locomotives 142–150 provided motive power on Bulgaria's first railway, opened in 1866 to connect Ruse on the River Danube with Varna on the Black Sea. Ordered from England shortly after the opening of the railway, they were intended as mixed-traffic locomotives to supplement the line's original locomotive fleet. They were powerful two-cylinder 0-6-0 locomotives with six-wheeled tenders.

In 1888 the Bulgarian railways were nationalised under the Railways Act 1885 and the locomotives became the property of the Bulgarian State Railways (BDŽ).

== Construction ==
The supervising engineers and construction companies contracted to build Bulgaria's first railway were all British and after the opening of the line in 1866 an order was placed for 10 new British-built locomotives to supplement the original fleet. Eight were constructed by Sharp, Stewart & Company in Manchester, and the other two by Beyer, Peacock & Company also of Manchester. They were all built and supplied between 1868 and 1869. They were numbered sequentially from 12 to 21.

== Ownership ==
On 1 July 1873 operation of the Ruse-Varna line was transferred to the Chemins de fer Orientaux (CO) company, the Ottoman Empire's principal railway operator, and the host line of the famous CIWL Orient Express service. Under CO ownership the English-built locomotives were renumbered in the series 279–288.

After the end of Ottoman rule, Bulgaria established its own National Assembly, which passed the Railways Act in 1885, leading to the establishment of the Bulgarian State Railways in 1888. The Ruse-Varna line was acquired that year, although operation was unaffected. Bulgaria declared independence on 5 October 1908 and this led to restructuring within BDŽ, as part of which the English-built locomotives were again renumbered, this time in the sequence 142–150. The reduction of sequential numbering from 10 to 9 resulted from the loss of original locomotive 12, which had been dismantled in 1873 as a source of spare parts for the other engines. In BDŽ service the locomotives were classified as class P 3/3 z along with the technically similar Austrian-built locomotives Bulgarian State Railways locomotives 151–157.

The locomotives were withdrawn from service in 1914, having completed nearly half a century of operational service.

== Preservation ==
One example of the class has been preserved. Locomotive 20 (later 285, then 148) was not scrapped, and in 1966 was transferred to the National Historic Collection. It is currently on display at the main location of the National Transport Museum at the original 1866 Ruse railway station.

== Table of locomotives ==
Number				Builder	Year built	Serial number	Notes
Original	CO	BDŽ (1888)	BDŽ (1908)	Builder	Year built	Serial number	Notes
14	279	279	142	Sharp, Stewart & Company	1868	1865	Withdrawn 1914
15	280	280	143	Sharp, Stewart & Company	1868	1866	Withdrawn 1914
16	281	281	144	Sharp, Stewart & Company	1868	1867	Withdrawn 1914
17	282	282	145	Sharp, Stewart & Company	1868	1868	Withdrawn 1914
18	283	283	146	Sharp, Stewart & Company	1868	1871	Withdrawn 1914
19	284	284	147	Sharp, Stewart & Company	1868	1872	Withdrawn 1914
20	285	285	148	Sharp, Stewart & Company	1868	1873	Withdrawn 1914 and preserved 1966 (Bulgarian national collection)
21	286	286	149	Sharp, Stewart & Company	1868	1874	Withdrawn 1914
12	287	-	-	Beyer, Peacock & Company	1868	834	Withdrawn 1873 and used for spare parts
13	288	288	150	Beyer, Peacock & Company	1869	925	Withdrawn 1914

== British construction ==
These 10 locomotives are the only engines built in the United Kingdom specifically for service in Bulgaria. Bulgarian State Railways also operates a fleet of Class 87 electric locomotives built at British Rail Engineering Limited at Crewe Works, although these were supplied second-hand after original service in the United Kingdom.

== See also ==
- List of BDŽ locomotives

== Additional sources ==
- Dimitar Ivanov, BDZ traction 1866–1946, Sofia, 1988 (in Bulgarian)
