= Ruse Central railway station =

Railway station in Ruse, Bulgaria

Ruse Русе
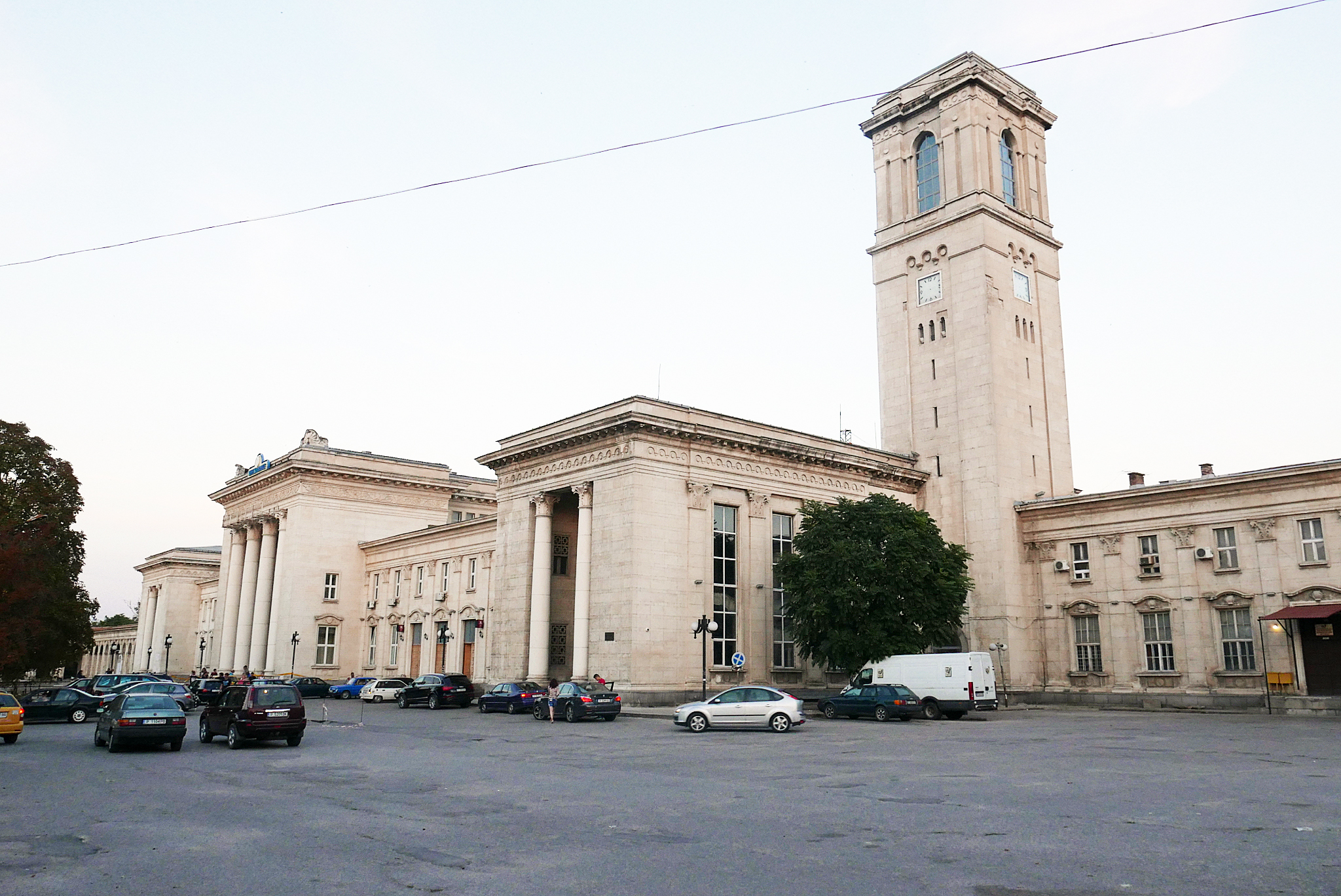

General information
- Location: 1 Aleksandar Stamboliyski Sq. Ruse, Bulgaria
- Coordinates: 43°49′58″N 25°57′18″E
- Owner: NRIC
- Platforms: 3
- Tracks: 4

Construction
- Structure type: At-grade
- Platform levels: 2
- Parking: Yes

History
- Opened: 1955
- Electrified: 1963
Location

Ruse Central railway station (Bulgarian: Централна железопътна гара Русе, romanized: Tsentralna zhelezopatna gara Ruse) is the main station serving the city and municipality of Ruse, the fifth most populous city in Bulgaria. After the opening of the Danube Bridge in 1954, a new grand Stalinist Central Railway Station was envisioned for the city of Ruse. The new station opened in late 1955 temporarily becoming the biggest on the Balkan Peninsula featuring three platforms, with four tracks and one passing track.

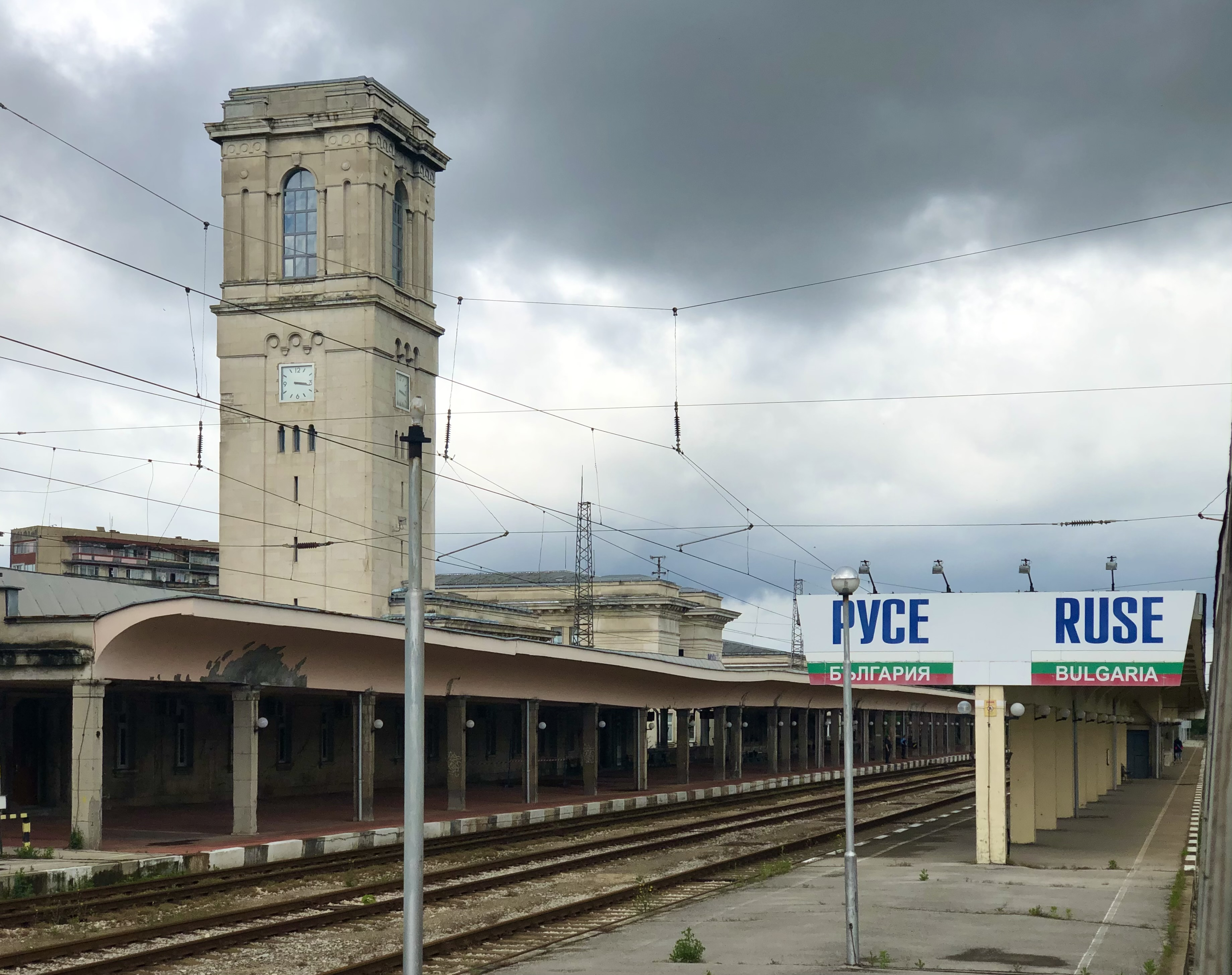
The clock tower and a station sign

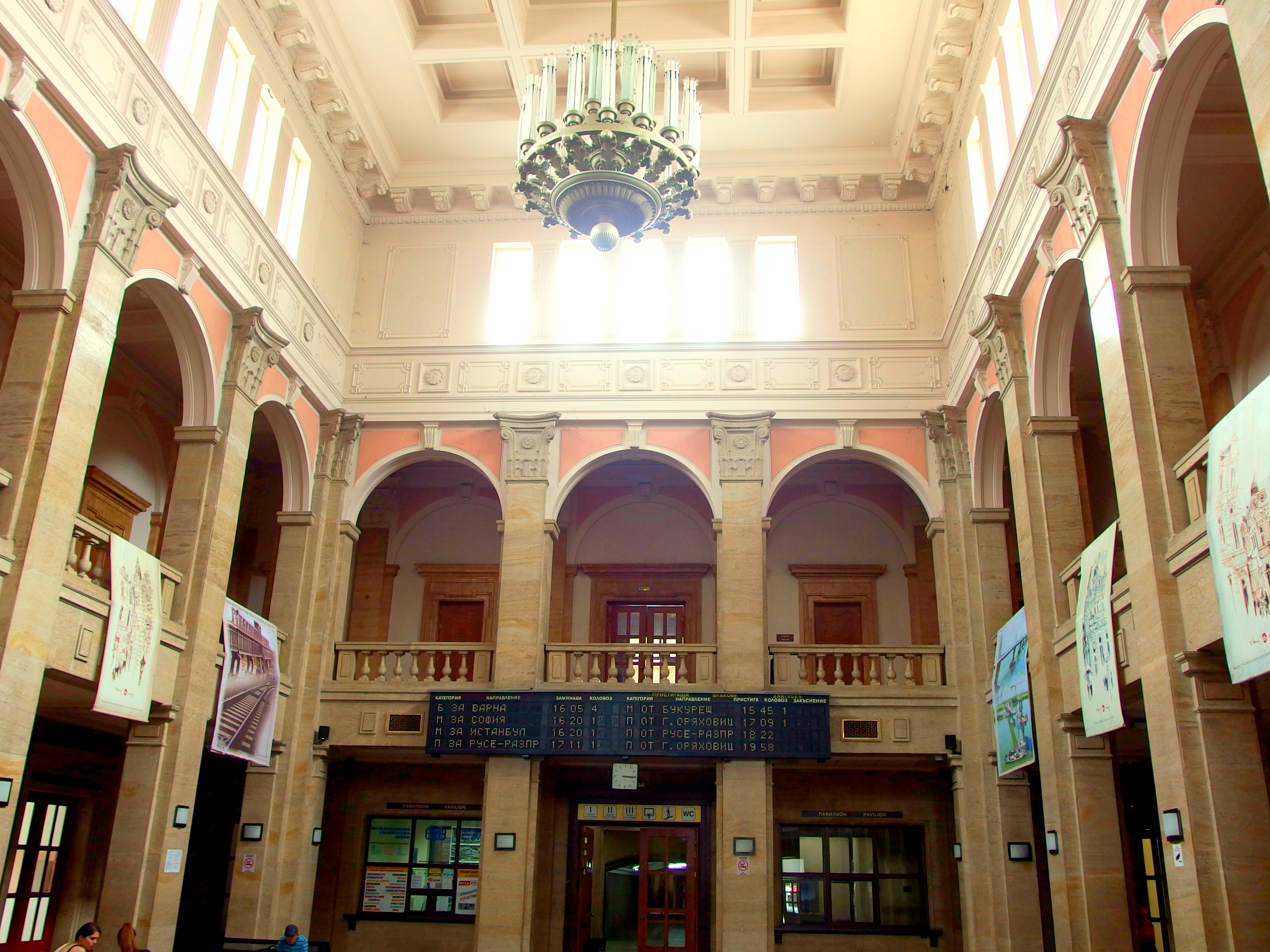
Inside the station

It is a transport hub, with trains to Gorna Oryahovitsa, Sofia, Varna, Plovdiv, and Burgas seasonally, as well as Bucharest and Istanbul internationally. The station serves as a border checkpoint for trains crossing into Romania, via the Danube Bridge.

== See also ==
- Trolleybuses in Ruse
