= Central Bus Station Sofia =

Bus station in Sofia, Bulgaria

Central Bus Station Sofia Централна автогара София 2026
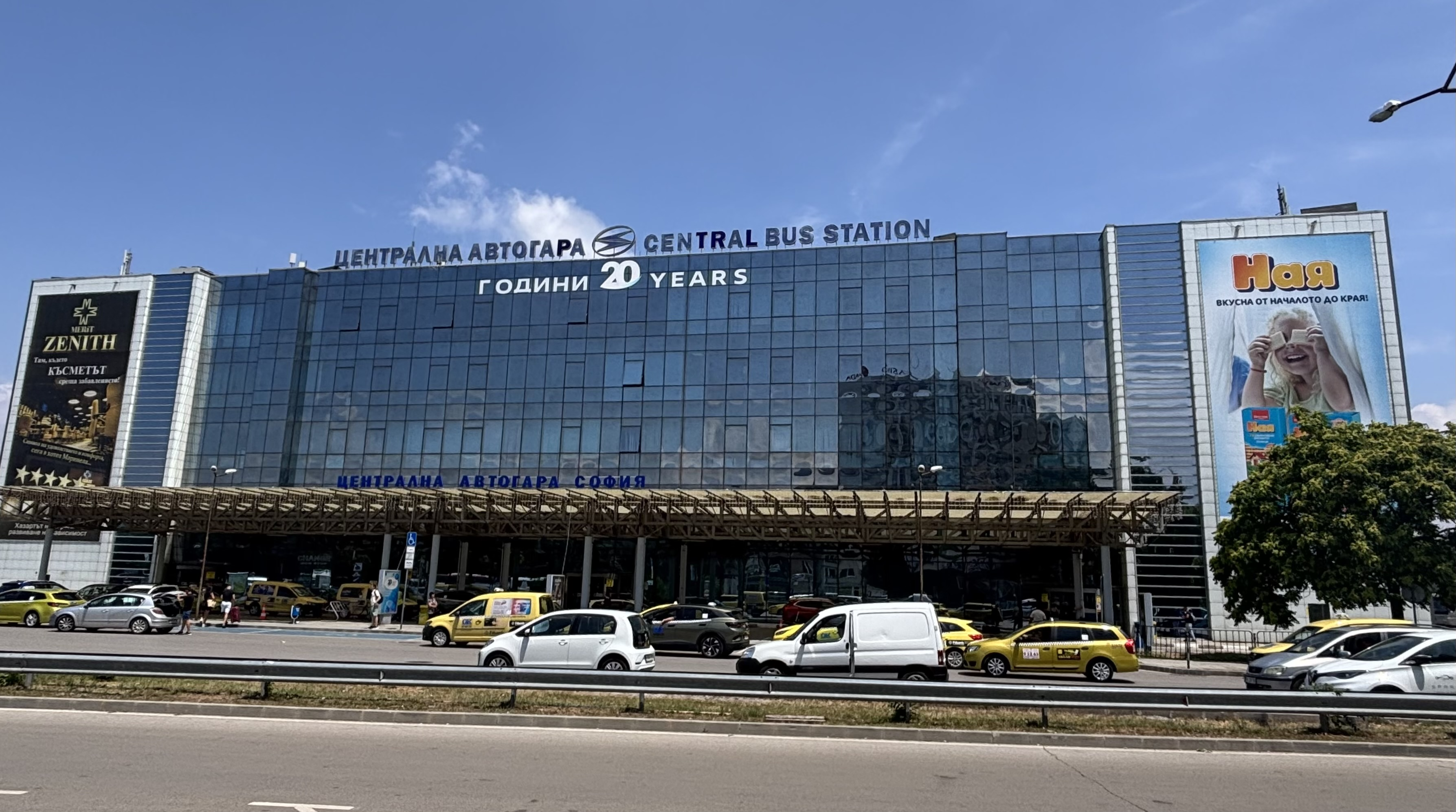
- Central Bus Station 2026 in Sofia

General information
- Location: 100 Kn. Maria Louisa Boulevard, Sofia
- Coordinates: 42°42′37″N 23°19′24″E
- Bus stands: 50

Other information
- Website: www.centralnaavtogara.bg

History
- Opened: 2004
Location

Central Bus Station Sofia (Bulgarian: Централна автогара София, romanized: Tsentralna avtogara Sofiya; abbreviated as CBS) is the main bus station of Sofia, Bulgaria. Its building was opened in 2004 and covers an area of 7,173 square metres (77,210 sq ft), of which the waiting area is 1,500 square metres (16,000 sq ft). The construction costs where 7.5 million euros. The bus station has 57 ticket windows, which accept cash, debit and credit. At any time, between 47 and 50 buses may enter or leave the station from 50 domestic and international bus stops. Ten additional bus stops are made available on days with heavy traffic. 2,250 passengers may pass through the waiting area in one hour. There are 130 surveillance cameras.

== See also ==
- Sofia Central Station
- Trams in Sofia
- Trolleybuses in Sofia
- Public buses in Sofia
- Sofia Public Transport
