= National Transport Museum, Bulgaria =

Coordinates: 43°51′38.40″N 25°57′49″E

National Transport Museum
- Национален музей на транспорта
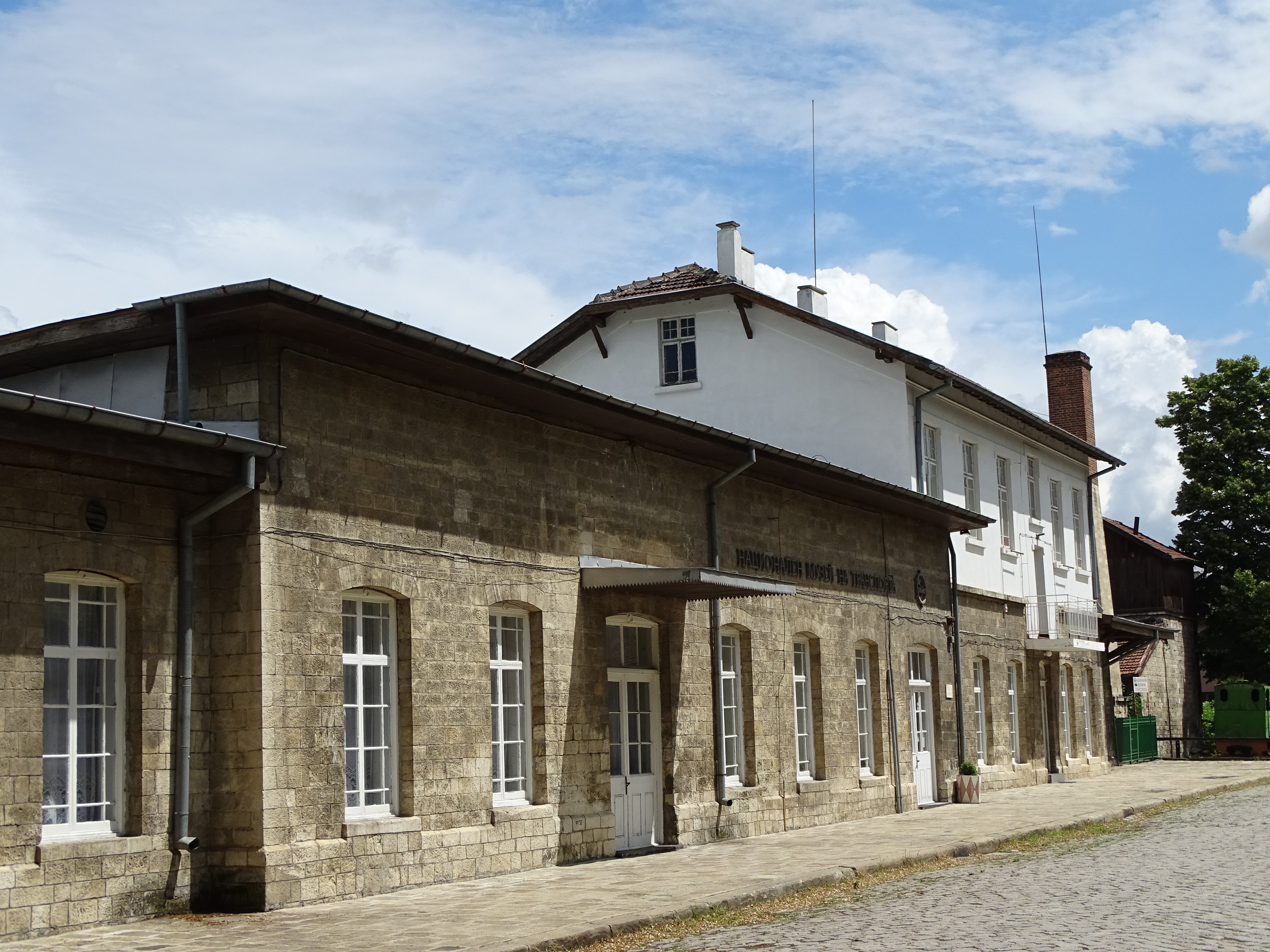
- Location: Ruse, Bulgaria
- Type: Railway museum

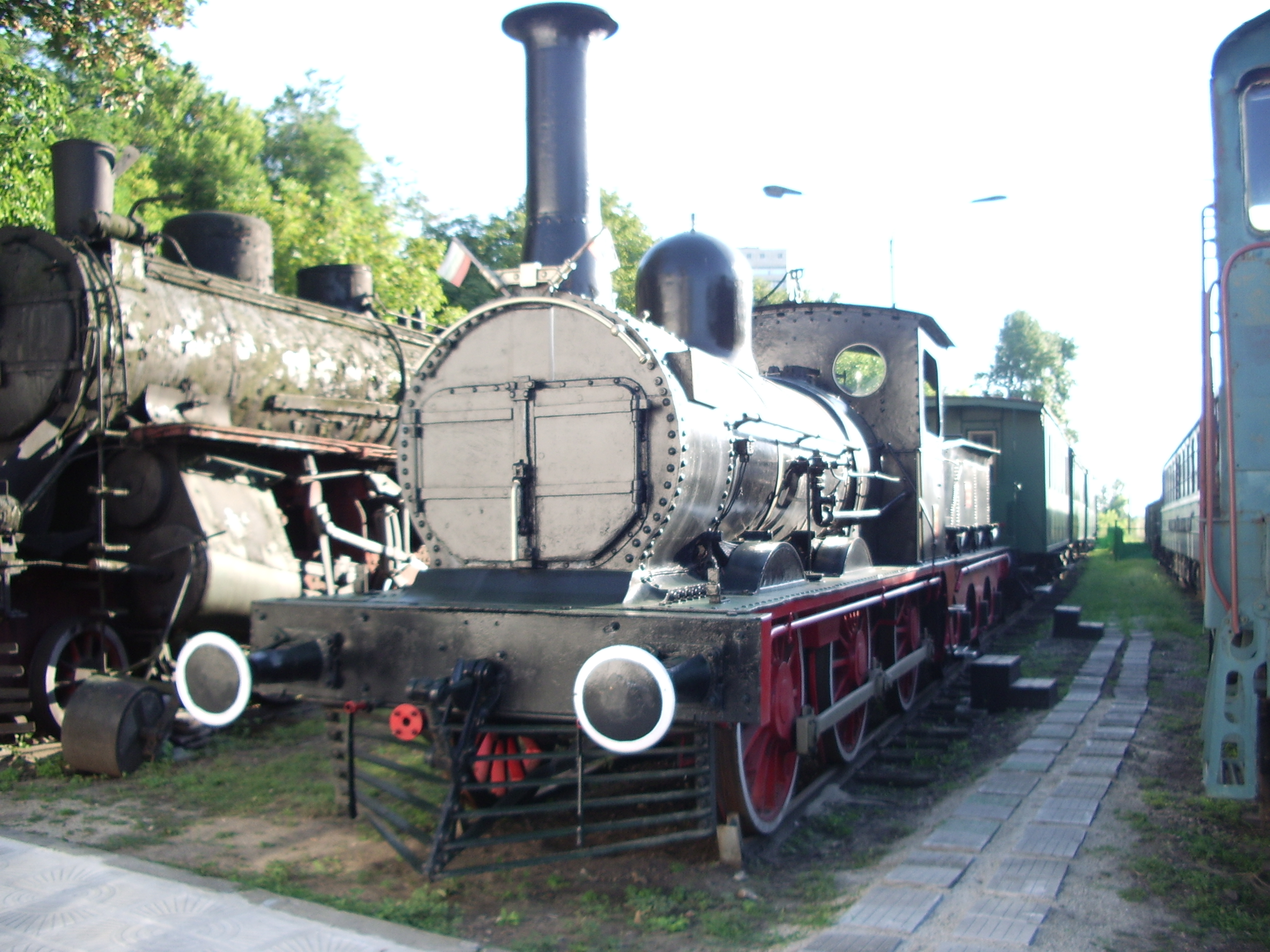
Preserved P3/3z steam engine 148 built 1868 — an exhibit at the museum

The National Transport Museum (Bulgarian: Национален музей на транспорта; Natsionalen Muzey na Transporta) in Ruse, Bulgaria, is situated on the bank of the Danube, in the country's first railway station, built in 1866.

== The museum ==
Exhibits are laid out both inside and outside the old station. Among the exhibits outside the building are more than ten steam engines, including the oldest steam engine preserved in the country (a class P 3/3 z, built in England in 1868, and various railroad carriages, including the personal carriages of the Kings Ferdinand of Bulgaria and Boris III of Bulgaria, as well as the carriage of the Turkish sultan of 1866.

As of 2007 the museum is underfunded, the heritage engines and railcars are stored in the open air without almost any maintenance, and the humid air from the nearby Danube accelerates significantly their decay.

The museum was named the National Museum of Railway Transport and Communications on 26 June 1996, commemorating the 100th anniversary of railroads in Bulgaria, and the building was declared a historical landmark. The museum's exhibits have been used in the films Capitan Petko Voivoda („Капитан Петко Войвода“), Records of Bulgarian Uprisings („Записки по българските въстания“), and the Russian-Bulgarian production Turkish Gambit.

== The old railway station ==
The construction of the old Rousse Railway Station was commenced in 1863 and completed three years later. The station is situated in the (then) outskirts of Rousse, near the high bank of the Danube, opposite to Giurgiu. It is not functioning now.

Building the railway station was the beginning of a larger project – the Rousse-Varna railway, executed under English, French, and Austria-Hungarian pressure. The new railway was intended to shorten journeys from London to Istanbul by five or six days. Its architectural and constructive plans were provided by the Birkleck brothers (Bulgarian: братя Бърклек; English spelling uncertain). A water tower, a supportive river wall, and a couple of other facilities were built nearby, using white limestone from nearby villages. In 1866 the station's construction was completed, and it had a waiting room, a room for the station manager, one for the clerk in charge, and some other premises.

The exploitation administration, headquartered in London, occupied the building shortly after its opening. Most of the clerks and the supporting staff were Bulgarians. Georgi Tsonchev was the supervisor general of the railway to Varna. Ilarion Dragostinov, Ivan Vedar, and Radi Ivanov worked there as telegraph operators; Georgi Ikonomov was a shunter operator. The railway station developed massive passenger and cargo activity for its time, partly due to the neighbouring harbour.

After opening the Rousse-Tarnovo railway in 1900 with its first station Rousse South, the old station was renamed Rousse East, and remained functional until the launching of a classification yard in June 1954, when it was transformed into (a part of the) National Transport Museum.

== Gallery ==
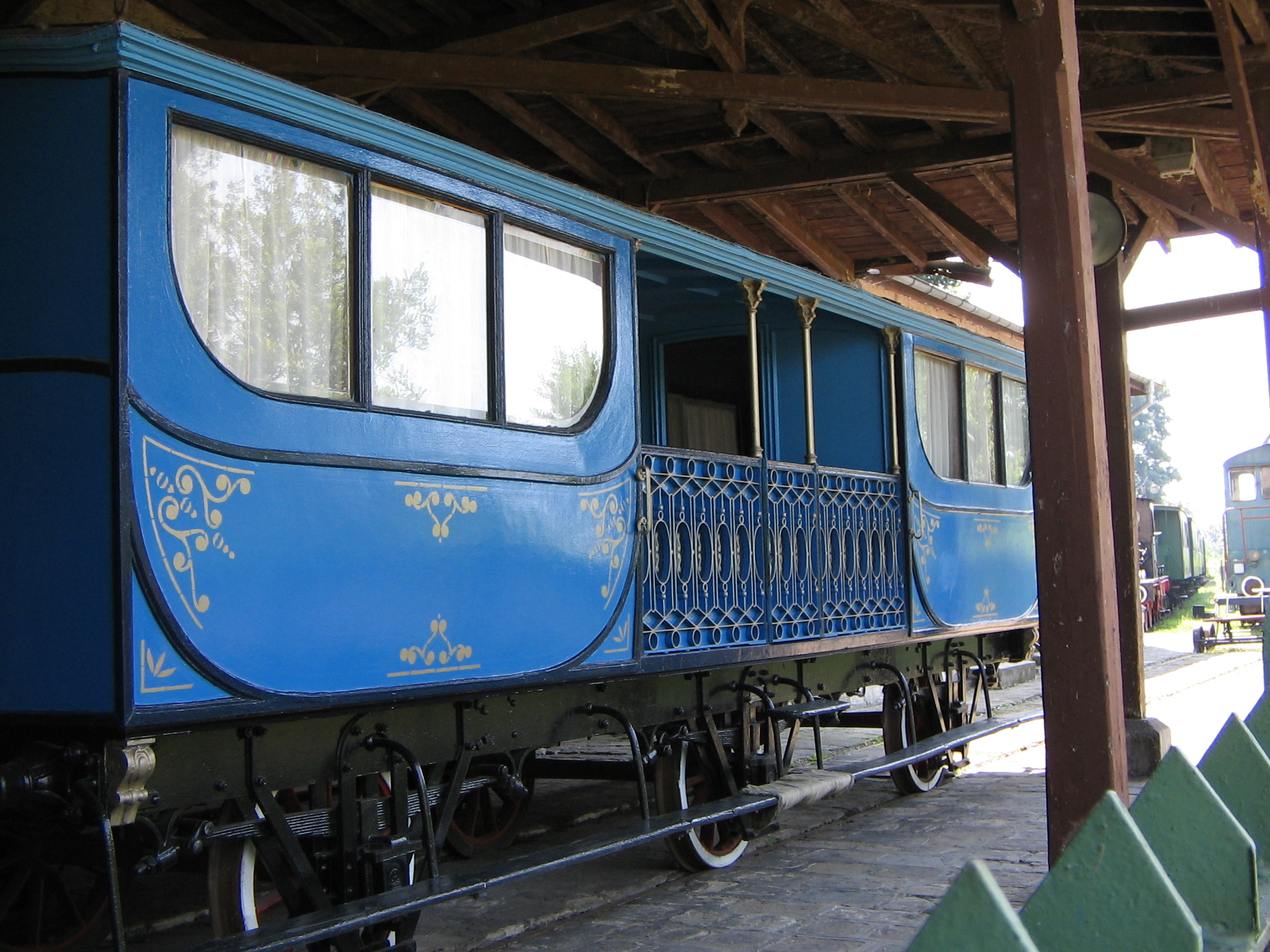
The Sultan's wagon

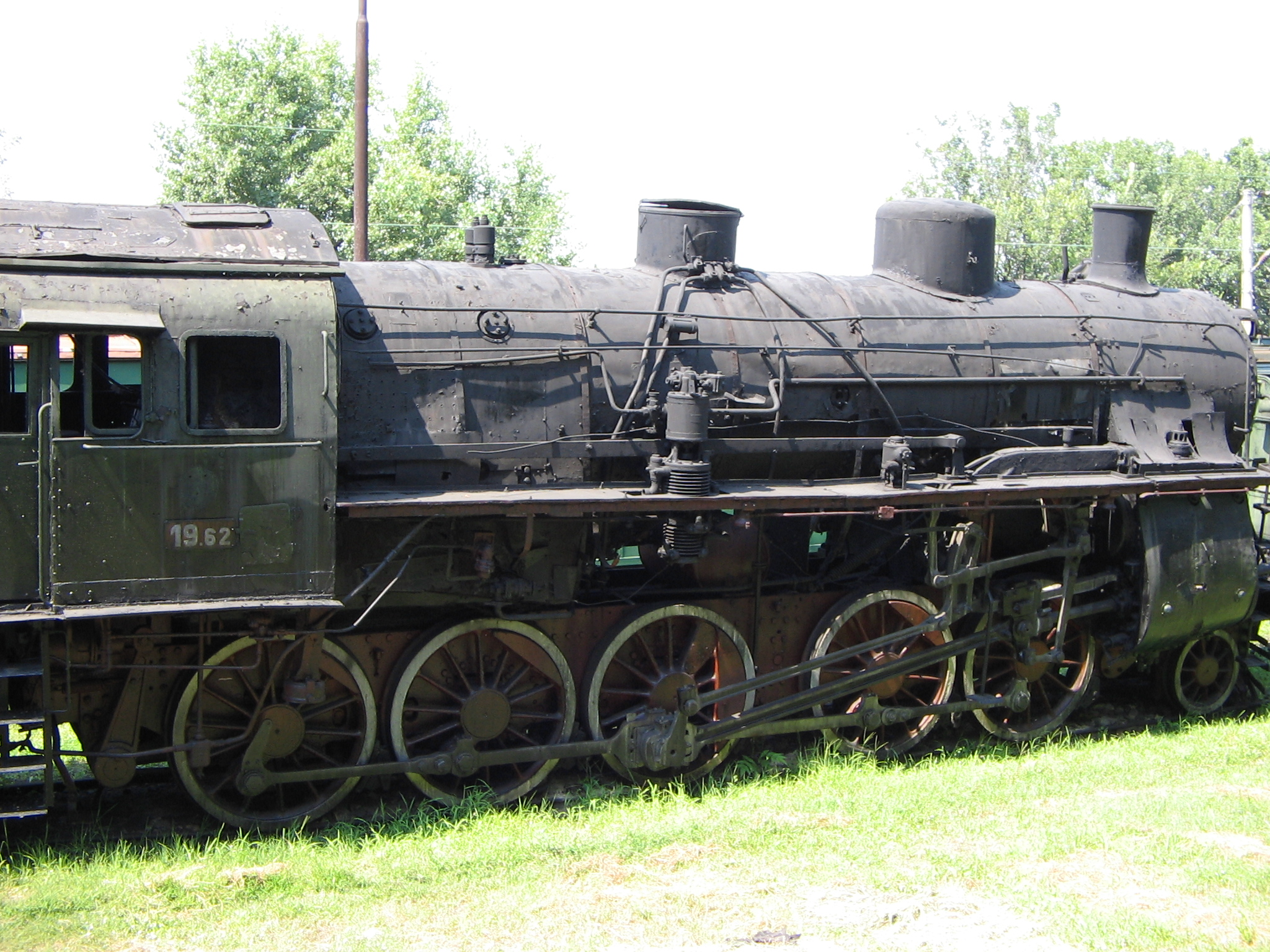

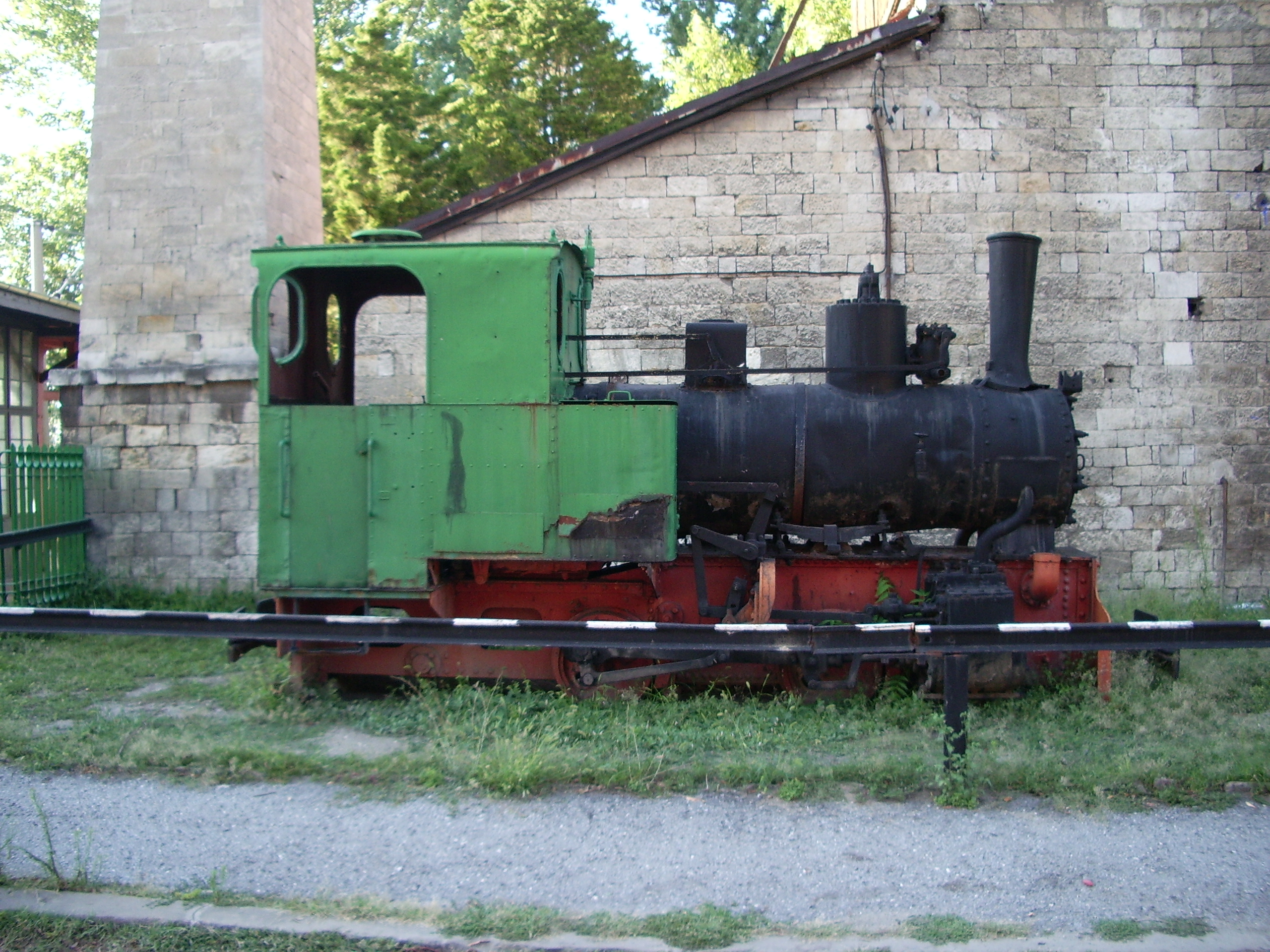

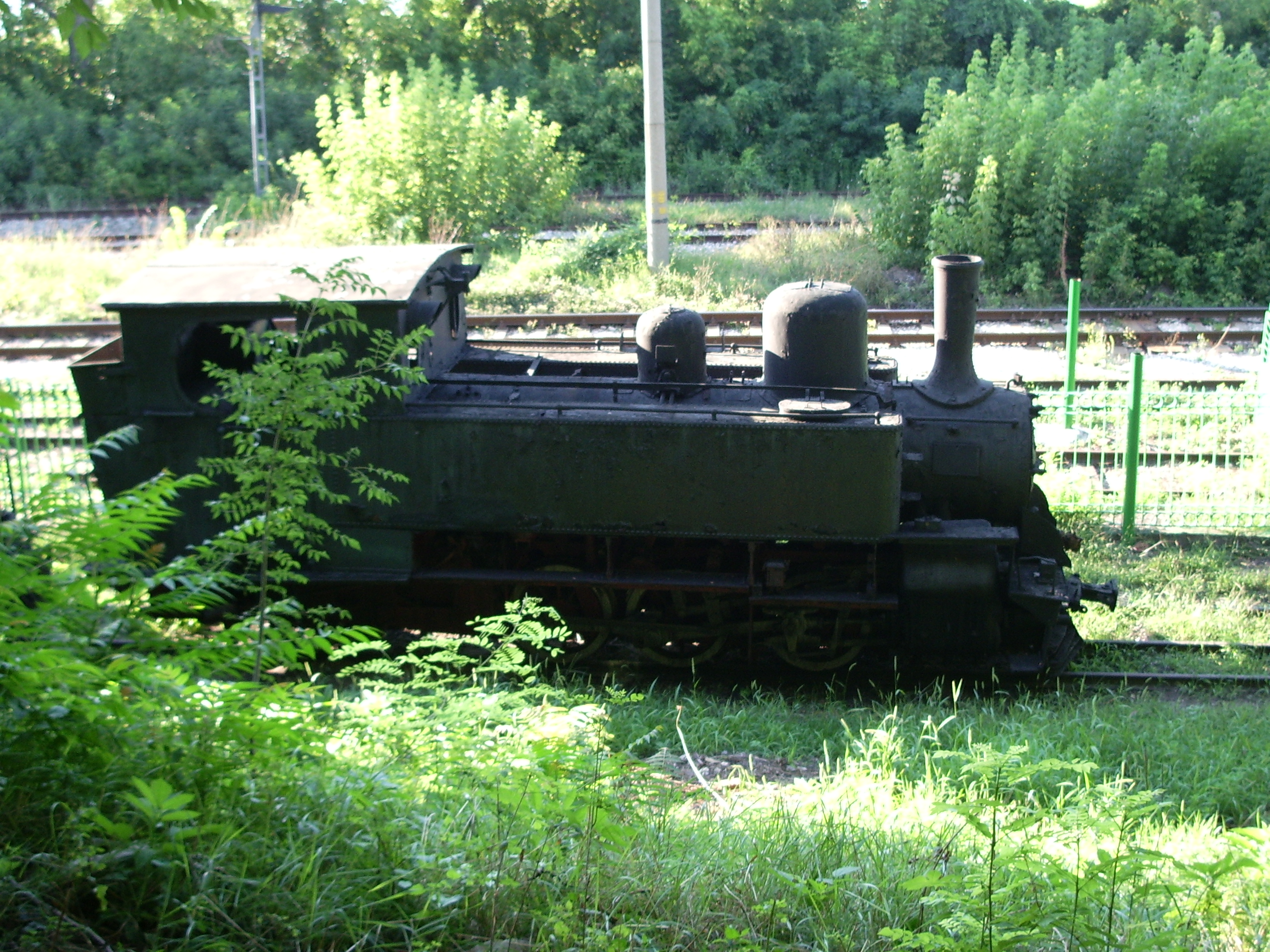

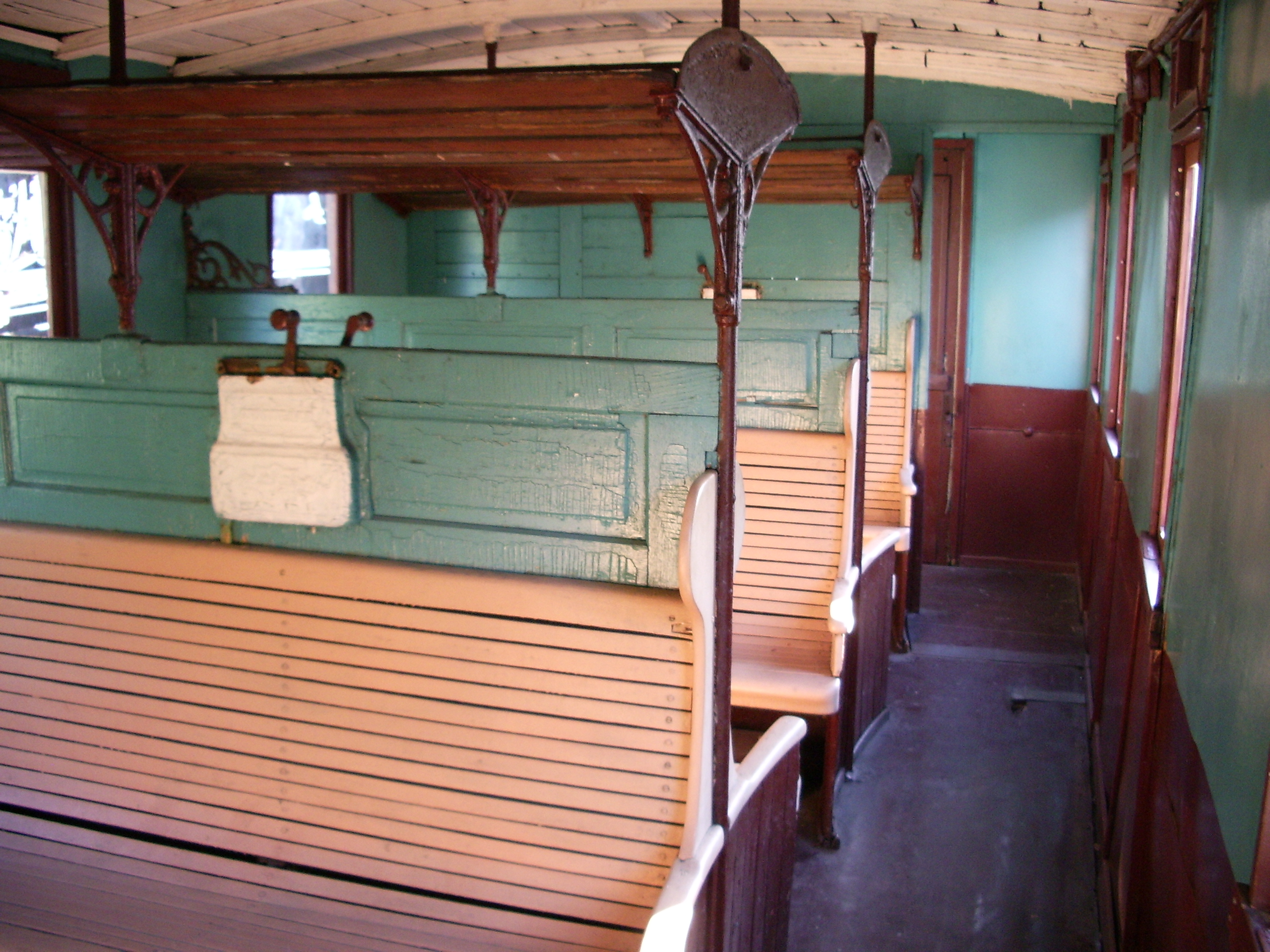
Interior of a carriage with heating

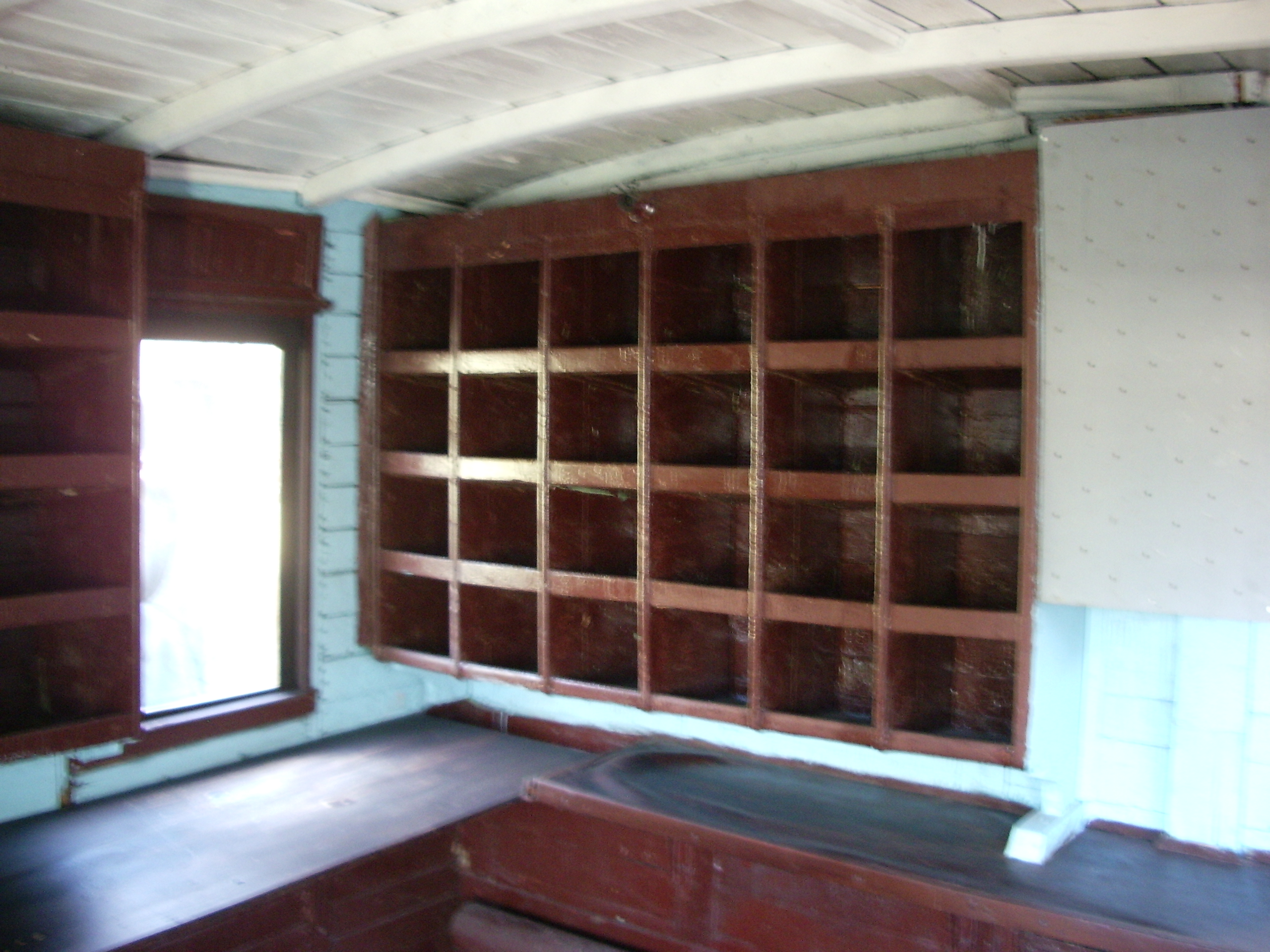
Interior — slots for mail transport

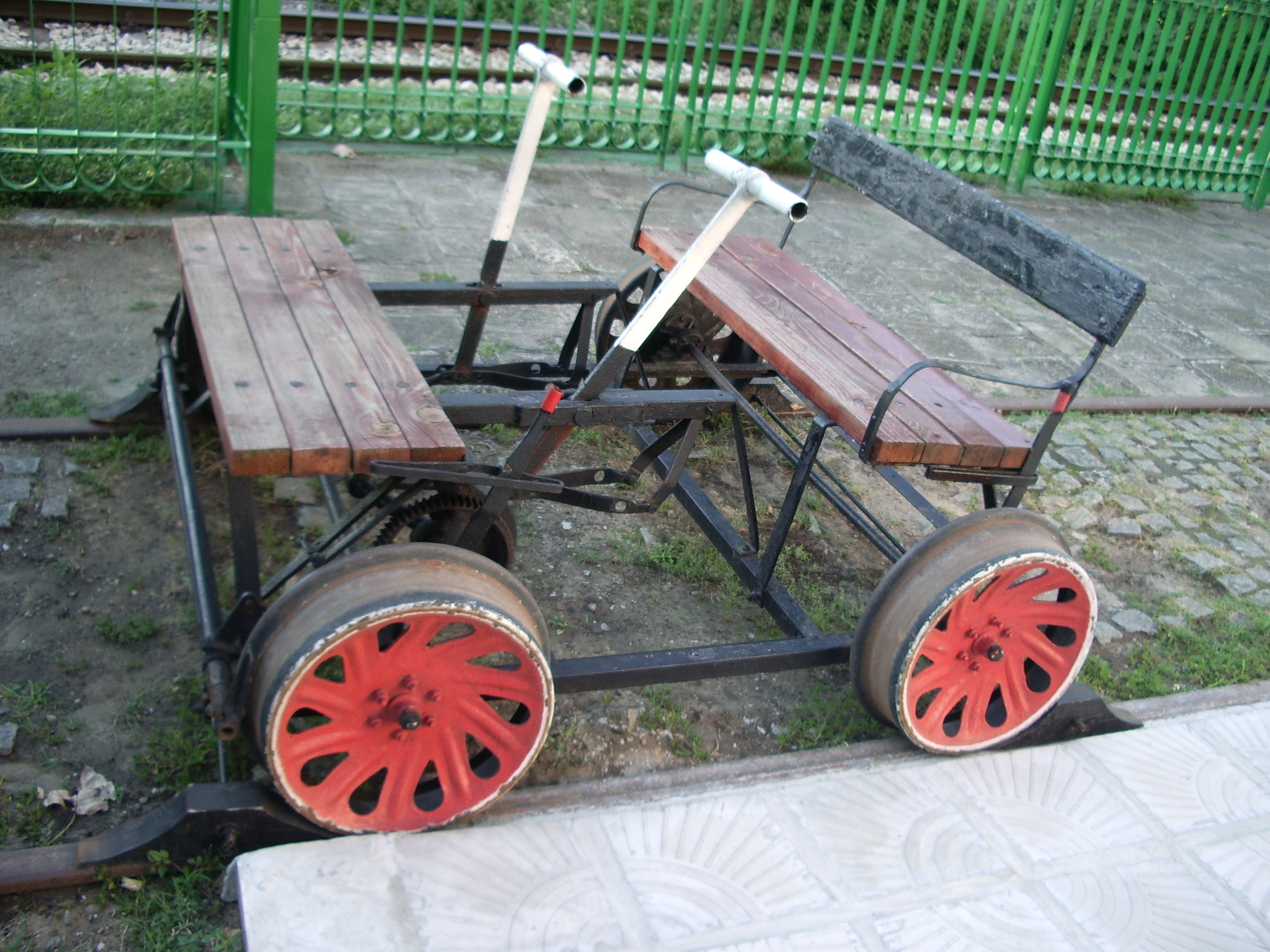
A handcar

== See also ==
- Orient Express
- Varna Railway Station
- List of museums in Bulgaria

== Sources ==
- The Utro (Bulgarian: Утро) newspaper, 21 July 2006, p. 4
