= Bosphorus Express =

International passenger railway line

Bosphorus Express Bosfor Ekspresi
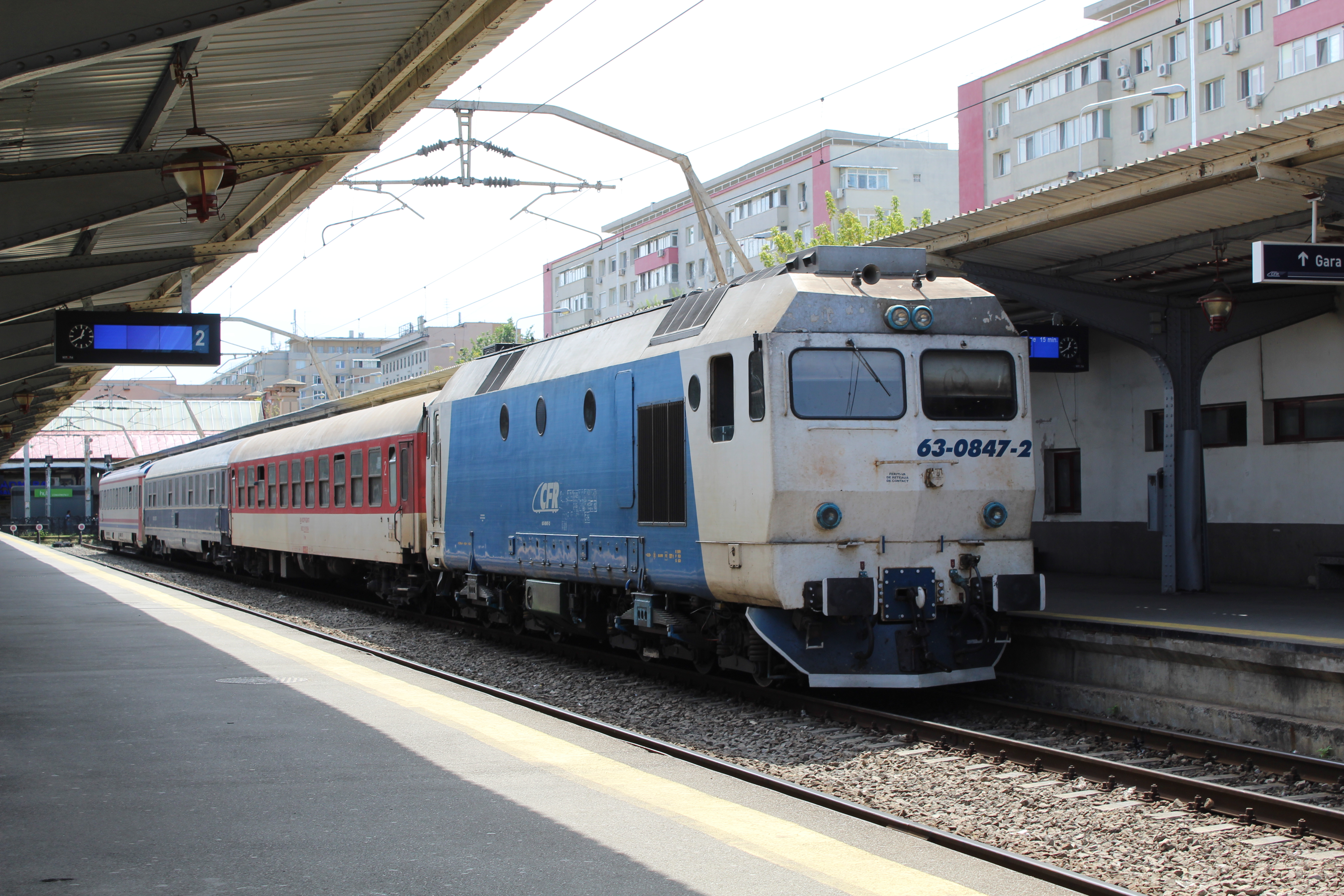
- The Bosphorus Express at Bucharest North station, 16 August 2019. The first car heads towards Sofia, and the 2 couchettes head towards Istanbul.

Overview
- Service type: InterCity
- Status: Operating
- Locale: European Turkey, eastern Bulgaria, southern Romania
- Current operators: TCDDT; BDZ; CFR
- Former operator: TCDD (Until 2016)

Route
- Termini: Halkalı station, Istanbul; Gara de Nord, Bucharest
- Stops: 8
- Average journey time: 13 hours, 29 minutes
- Service frequency: Daily each way
- Train numbers: 81032, 492, 464 (westbound), 81031, 461 (eastbound)

On-board services
- Sleeping arrangements: Private sleeping room accommodations and couchette cars
- Catering facilities: Dining car
- Baggage facilities: Yes

Technical
- Track gauge: 1,435 mm (4 ft 8 1/2 in) standard gauge
- Electrification: Istanbul to Kapıkule and Dimitrovgrad to Ruse
- Track owners: TCDD Istanbul-Kapıkule; BDŽ Kapitan Andreevo-Ruse; CFR Giurgiu-Bucharest

The Bosphorus Express (Bulgarian: Босфор експрес), also known as the Trans Balkan Express (Turkish: Bosfor Ekspresi), is an international passenger train running between Istanbul, Turkey and Bucharest, Romania. It runs together with the Istanbul-Sofia Express as far as Dimitrovgrad upon entering Bulgaria, where the latter continues to Sofia. The train is jointly operated by three national railways: the TCDD Taşımacılık (TCDD), the Bulgarian State Railways (BDZ), and the Romanian State Railways (CFR). The train serves several important cities including Istanbul, Edirne, Stara Zagora, and Bucharest.

== Stock ==
The train is pulled by a variety of locomotives in each country. Today the train consists of three or four cars usually supplied by the three railways. There are two couchettes, either TCDD Intercity stock or CFR 40-31/44-31 stock, a single coach, either TCDD or CFR, and a CFR sleeping car. Since the train uses electrified and non-electrified track, locomotives pulling the train also change. From Istanbul, the train is pulled by an E68000 electric locomotive to Kapıkule, where a BDŽ class-07 diesel locomotive becomes the motive power. At Dimitrovgrad, Bulgaria, the BDŽ class-07 de-couples and either a BDŽ class-43 or a BDZ class-45 electric locomotive couples onto the train. At Russe, the BDŽ electric locomotive is exchanged with a Romanian class-65 diesel locomotive, which pulls the train to Bucharest.

=== Typical configurations ===
İstanbul–Kapıkule

- TCDD E68000 Locomotive
- TCDD Couchette
- TCDD Couchette

Kapıkule–Dimitrovgrad

- BDŽ Class-07 Locomotive
- TCDD Couchette
- TCDD Couchette

Dimitrovgrad–Gorna Oryahovitsa

- BDŽ Class-43 or BDŽ Class-45 Locomotive
- TCDD Couchette
- BDŽ Coach

Gorna Oryahovitsa–Russe

- BDŽ Class-43 or BDŽ Class-45 Locomotive
- CFR Couchette
- TCDD Couchette
- BDŽ Coach

Russe–Bucharest

- CFR Class-65 Locomotive
- CFR Couchette
- TCDD Couchette

Between Dimitrovgrad and Russe, one or two BDŽ Coaches are added to the train for domestic travel.

== Route ==
The journey starts at Halkali station in the suburb of Marmaray, 27 km (17 mi) from Istanbul's Sirkeci Terminal. After passing through Edirne it arrives at the town of Kapıkule on the Turkish-Bulgarian border. The electric locomotive disconnects and is replaced with a diesel locomotive. Passengers need to disembark and cross the rail tracks to clear passport control. After the city of Gorna Oryahovitsa, the train arrives at the city of Ruse on the Danube river. A diesel locomotive once again takes over, and it crosses the Danube via the Danube Bridge and into the Romanian town of Giurgiu, stopping at the Giurgiu North Railway Station. Then it continues north to Bucharest. After circling the city, the train enters from the northwest into Bucharest North railway station.

== Gallery ==
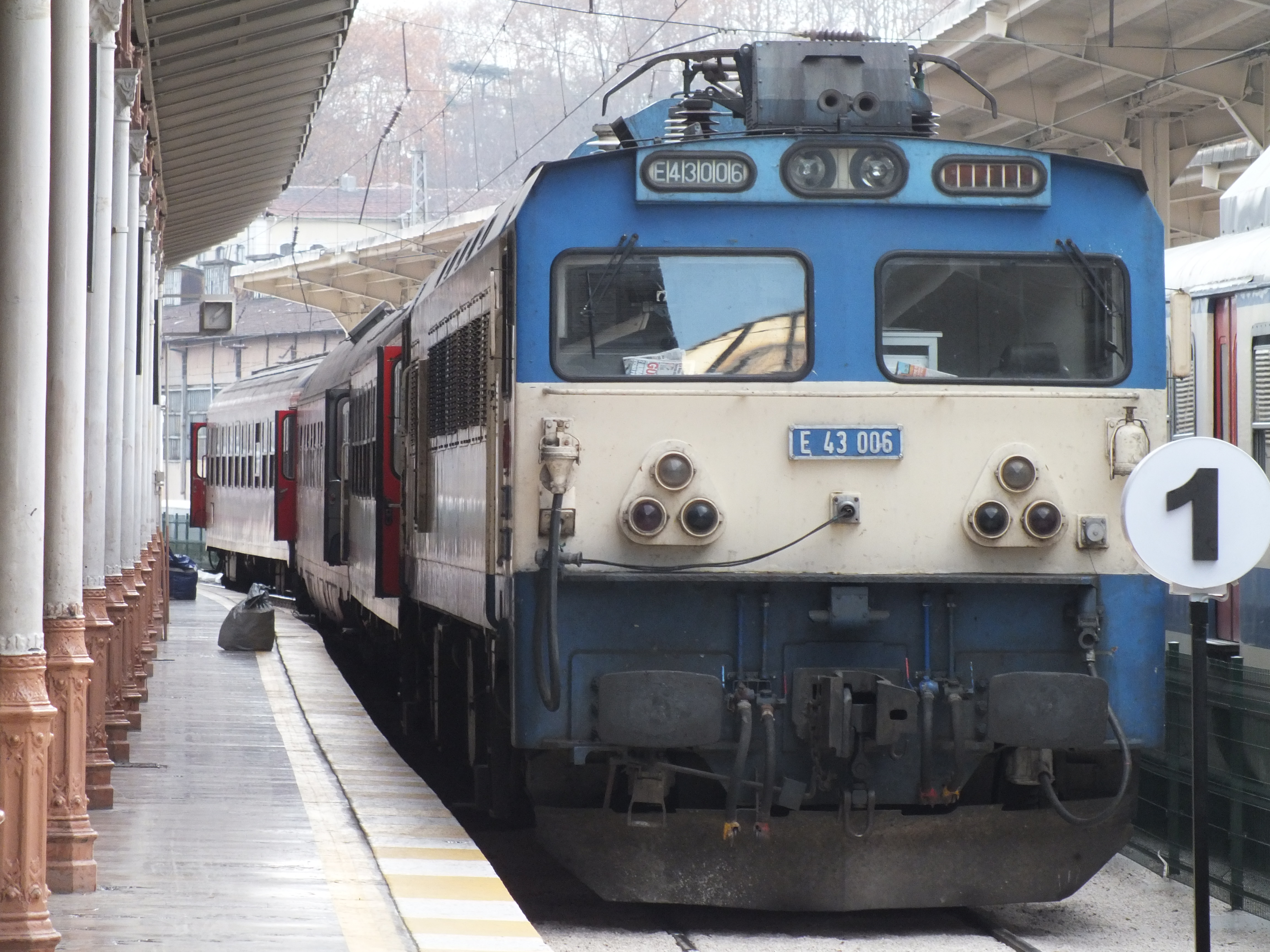
The Bosphorus Express at Sirkeci Terminal.

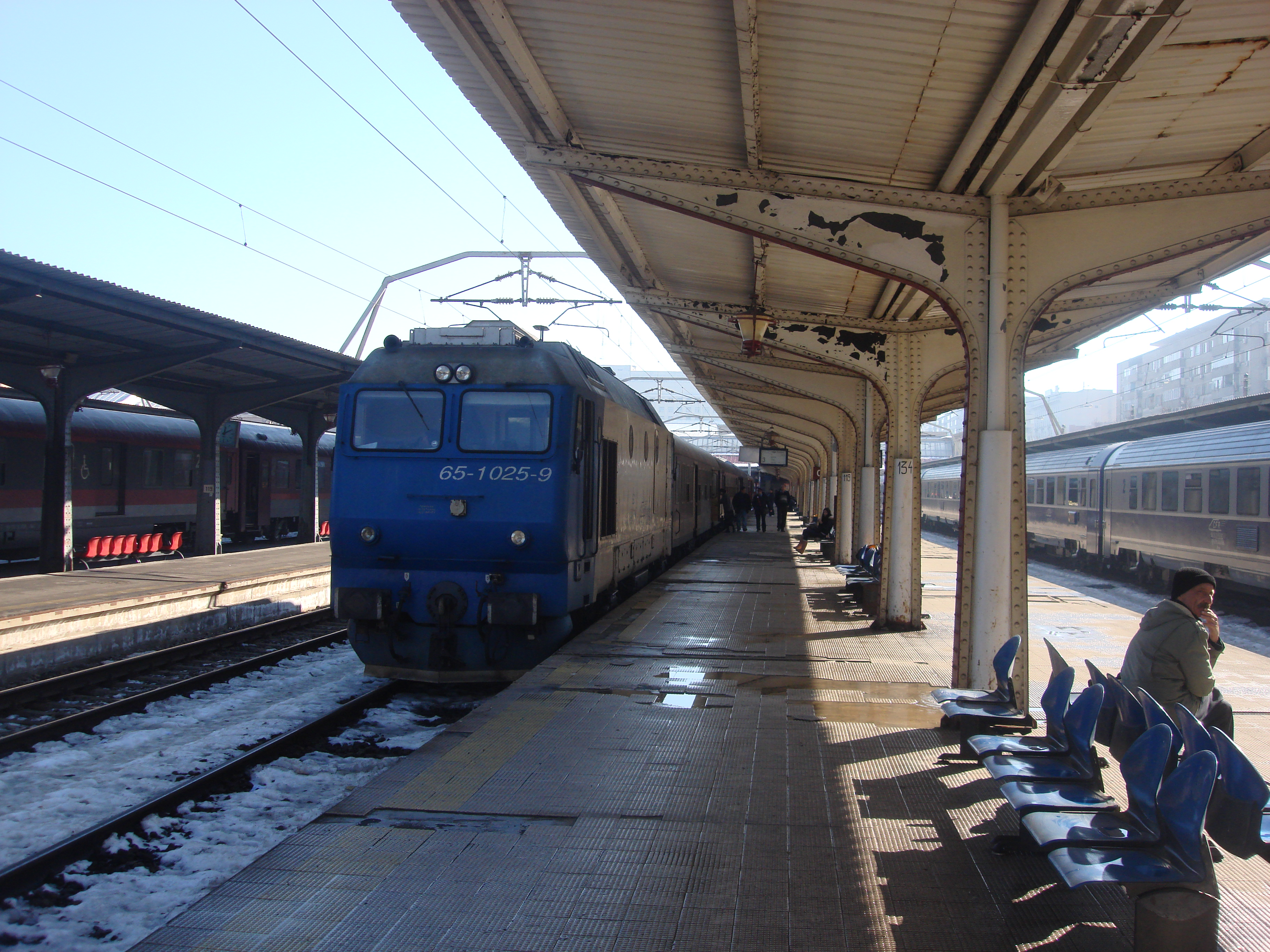
The Bosphorus Express waiting to depart Bucharest.

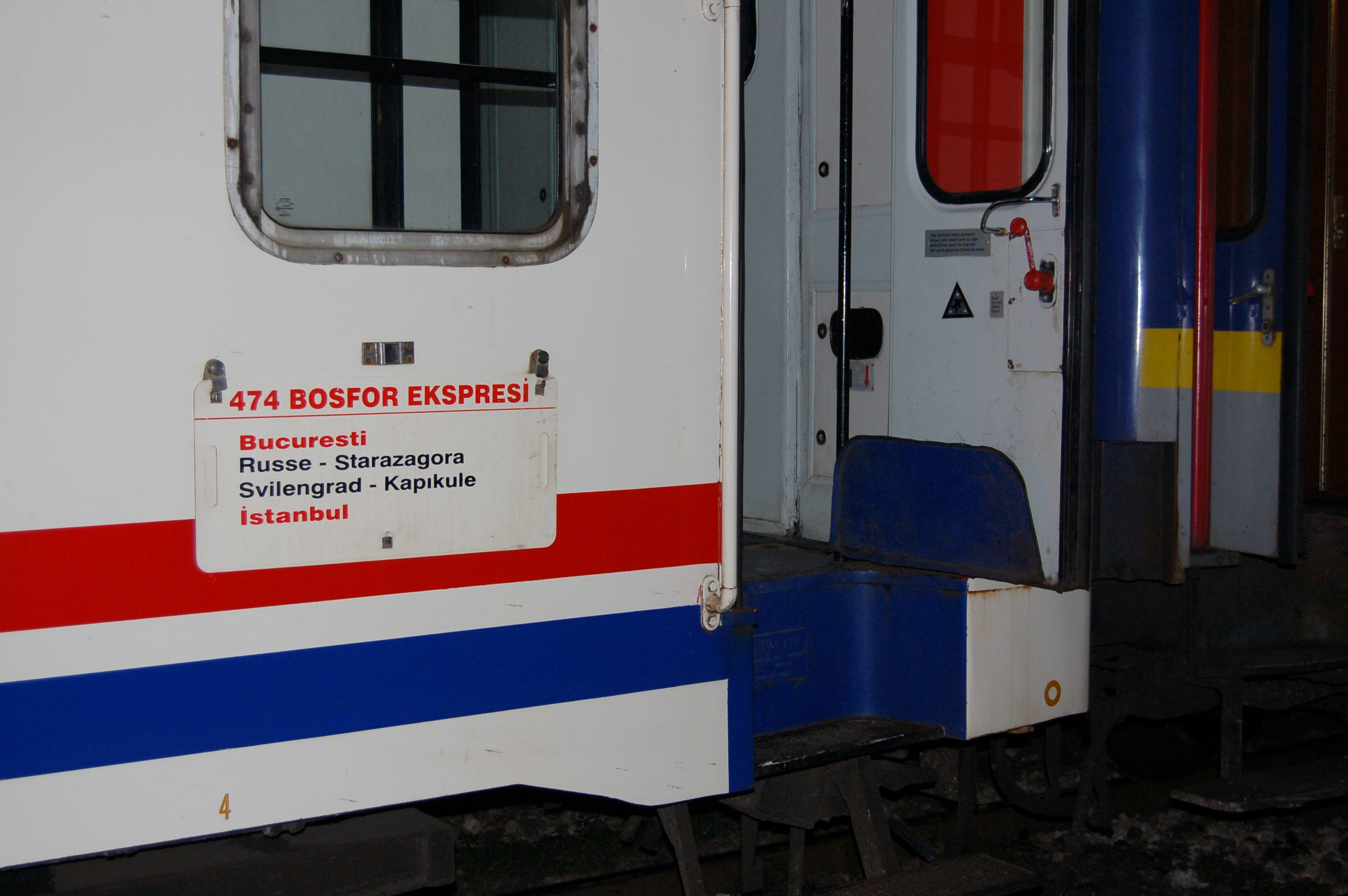
The old destination board on a TCDD couchette car.
