= Varna railway station =

Railway station in Varna, Bulgaria

Varna Варна
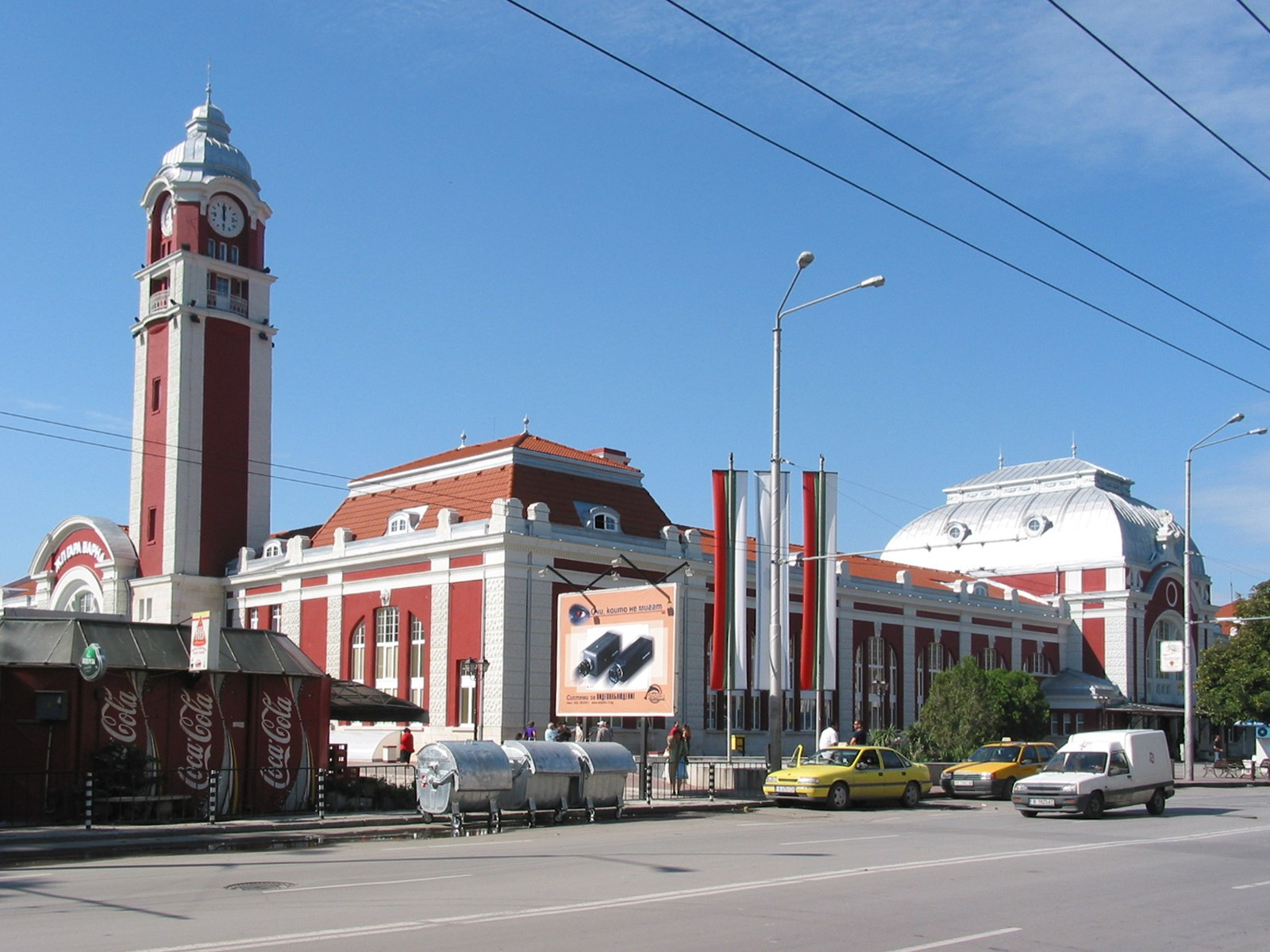
- The station building.

General information
- Location: Bulgaria
- Coordinates: 43°11′53″N 27°54′44″E
- Line(s): Railway line 2

History
- Opened: 1925
Location

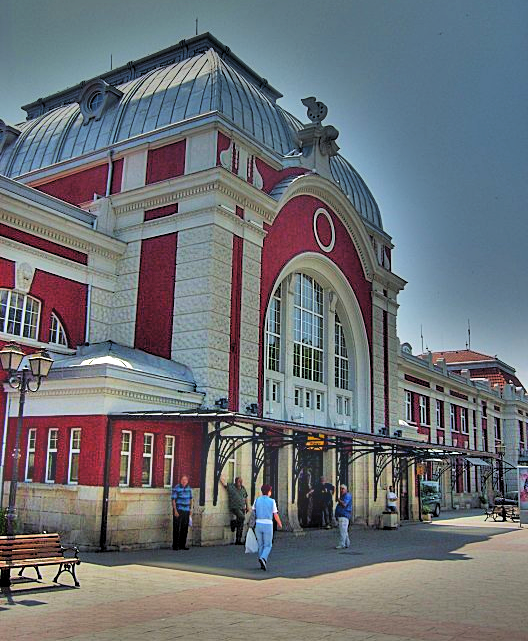
Main entrance to the station building.

Varna railway station (Bulgarian: Железопътна гара Варна, romanized: Zhelezopatna gara Varna) serves the Black Sea city and municipality of Varna, the third most populous city in Bulgaria.

== History ==
The station is one of the oldest in Bulgaria. The current station building was built between 1908 and 1925, when it was opened officially by Tsar Boris III. The city of Varna has had a railway station since October 26, 1866, when the Varna-Rousse railway line was opened.

The station was built in several stages, under the supervision of architects Nikola Kostov and Kiro Marichkov. The building is in the Art Nouveau style with elements of Neo-Baroque. Italian architects were also involved with styling both in inside and the outside of the building. German clockwork was installed in the station's clock tower in 1929. The station underwent major restoration work in 2004 and 2005.

Burgas Central railway station was constructed in a similar style.

Early on, Varna was a "stop" along the Orient Express route, where passengers boarded a ferry to Constantinople after taking a train from Giurgiu to Ruse, then a ferry to Varna. Today, it is a key railway junction with three lines to Sofia and separate lines to Karnobat, Rousse, Plovdiv, Pleven, Shumen, Dobrich, etc.
