= National Railway Infrastructure Company =

Bulgarian railway operator

- Native name: Национална компания Железопътна инфраструктура
- Romanized name: Natsionalna kompaniya Zhelezopatna infrastruktura
- Company type: Government company
- Industry: Railway infrastructure
- Founded: 1 January 2002
- Headquarters: Sofia, Bulgaria
- Area served: Bulgaria
- Key people: Zlatin Angelov Krumov (CEO)
- Number of employees: 13 365 (2011)
- Parent: Bulgarian Ministry of Transport, Information Technology and Communications
- Website: www.rail-infra.bg

The National Railway Infrastructure Company (Bulgarian: Национална компания Железопътна инфраструктура, Natsionalna kompaniya Zhelezopatna infrastruktura, abbreviated as НКЖИ or NRIC) is Bulgaria's state railway infrastructure company, established as an entity on 1 January 2002. The company's headquarters are located in the capital city Sofia near Sofia Central Station. It is the owner and operator of most of the country's rail lines.

Bulgaria is a member of the International Union of Railways (UIC). The UIC Country Code for Bulgaria is 52.

== History ==
On 1 January 2002, National Railway Infrastructure Company (NRIC) was established as a state-owned entity upon the enactment of previously approved legislation. It was created for the purpose of maintaining the condition of the railway infrastructure for the use of licensed operators (including its repair, operation, and development), collect infrastructure access charges as defined by the Bulgarian government, define timetables in coordination with train operators, conform with all relevant safety, reliability, and security requirements in its management of the railways, fulfil all public service obligations, and to keep detailed, accurate, and up-to-date records on all objects pertaining to the railway infrastructure and associated land.

By the arrival of the twenty-first century, Bulgaria's railway network was amongst the most dense of all Eastern European nations, having a total track length of 6,938km, 148 tunnels, 483 level crossings, and 1,016 bridges. Roughly 67% of all track in Bulgaria was electrified. However, connections with neighbouring nations were limited; only two cross-border lines into Greece and Romania were operational, along with one line for Serbia and Turkey, while no lines connected to Macedonia. The majority of Bulgarian lines, by means of its geometric parameters and trackside structures, were typically limited to a maximum speed of 100km/h; a persistent shortage of funds for maintenance during the 1990s had also diminished track quality in places, forcing speed restrictions in places and negatively impacting both freight and passenger services. However, the NRIC soon formulated ambitious plans to bolster operating speeds, capacity, and regional interconnectivity via the upgrading of its network.

During the late 2000s, the NRIC was engaged in infrastructure modernisation efforts; a key aim of these schemes was to pursue the closer integration of the Bulgarian railway with that of the wider European community. By 2008, Bulgarian legislation had been harmonised with European Union (EU) counterparts, a move that was promoted as elevating both safety and efficiency standards; considerable financial support was also being provided by the EU for railway-related schemes. Work was primarily focused upon those lines than corresponded with Common European Transport Corridor routes; accordingly, improvements were being pursued to bring these into compliance with the technical operational parameters of track, catenary and signalling.

One such project was the construction of a second bridge over the Danube, along with connecting lines on either side, at a cost of €226 million. The modernisation of the railway line between Vidin and Sofia was costed at €1,324 million, while the electrification and reconstruction of the Plovdiv – Svilengrad line (facilitating a wider railway connection between Europe and Asia) came to a cost of €340 million. The doubling and electrification of the Carnobat and Syndel line cost €2,112 million. Further refurbishments of other lines, aimed not only at expanding technical compliance but also operational capacity, were also underway during the late 2000s and early 2010s. Another area of investment was in improving intermodal freight; a new terminal serving the Sofia region was constructed while further facilities were in planning.

During early 2012, it was reported that the organisation aimed to have completed all work in respect to lines on the Serbian border– Sofia–Plovdiv–Svilengrad–Turkish/Greek border and Plovdiv–Burgas by 2020, which shall permit an elevated maximum speed of 160km/h along those routes while also bringing them into full compliance with the technical specifications for interoperability. Furthermore, additional freight terminals at Plovdiv and Russe were in the early stages of construction. Between 2012 and 2014, Лв. 1.3 billion to be invested into the railway. In February 2013, NRIC awarded a contract to a consortium of Thales and Kapsch for the deployment of GSM-R telecommunications and European Train Control System (ETCS) Level 1 trackside equipment, alongside electronic interlockings and other apparatus; amongst other benefits, the new systems should facilitate increasing line speeds, improved reliability, and greater operational capacity. That same year, it was announced that strong financial performance had been recorded at NRIC, permitting the clearance of all debts that were owed to external partners; this turnaround, as the organisation at one point had been facing substantial fiscal stress, was largely attributed to restricting efforts that had, amongst other changes, caused a reduction in staff headcount from 15,000 in December 20009 to 12,600 by October 2012.

By the mid 2010s, the NRIC was reportedly generating the majority of its revenue from track access charges on the various train operators, both domestic and international. In early 2013, the agency was negotiating with the World Bank for a Лв. 140 million loan to finance the purchasing of new maintenance machinery. To help mitigate financial difficulties, the NRIC adopted various cost optimisation processes and fiscal implementation reviews, including for alternative financing options where applicable. Around this same timeframe, it also invested in the modernisation of numerous level crossings with the aim of reducing accident rates, which had been amongst the highest recorded in Europe at the time. Specific measures included the installation of additional signals, automation of numerous crossings, extra axle counters, and new CCTV installations.

By 2021, the NRIC had reportedly electrified 80% of the Bulgarian railway network while work was still ongoing on increasing this further. During the early 2020s, it was engaged in the establishment of a railway line between the cities of Sofia and Skopje, having gained the backing of both Bulgarian and Macedonian governments, reviving construction work that had been initially started during the early 1940s in the process. Furthermore, the agency was actively implementing new computerised management systems, optical cable networks, and digital equipment that would enhance train capacity and safety levels, while new substation apparatus would reduce energy consumption.
