= Ganz DVM-4 =

Diesel-electric shunting locomotive

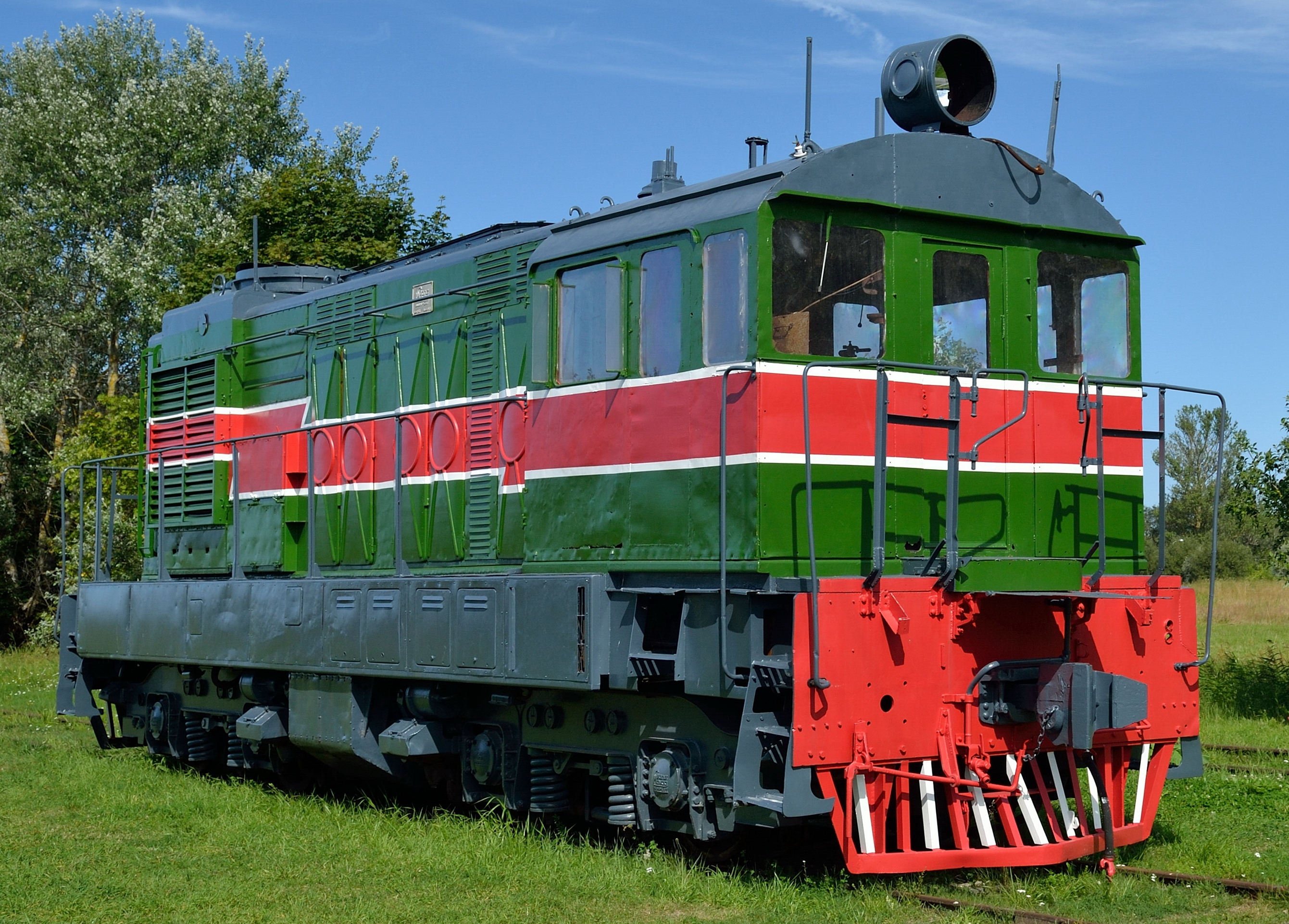
- VME1-116 preserved at Haapsalu, Estonia
Type and origin
- Power type: Diesel-electric
- Builder: Ganz-MÁVAG; Hungarian People's Republic
- Build date: 1958-1965
Specifications
- Configuration
  - UIC: Bo′Bo′
- Gauge: 1,524 mm (5 ft) (USSR); 1,435 mm (4 ft 8 1/2 in) (DPRK)
- Wheel diameter: 1,050 mm (3 ft 5 in)
- Length: 12,850 mm (42 ft 2 in)
- Width: 3,110 mm (10 ft 2 in)
- Height: 4,600 mm (15 ft 1 in)
- Axle load: 18.4 t (18.1 long tons; 20.3 short tons)
- Loco weight: 73.4 t (72.2 long tons; 80.9 short tons)
- Fuel type: Diesel
- Fuel capacity: 1,000 kg (2,200 lb)
- Water cap.: 600 L (160 US gal; 130 imp gal)
- Prime mover: Ganz-Jendrassik; 16 JVF 17/24
- Engine type: V16 Diesel engine
- Aspiration: Normal
- Traction motors: 4× TS32-44/14
- Cylinders: 16
- Cylinder size: 170 mm × 240 mm (7 in × 9 in)
- Transmission: Electrical
- Gear ratio: 73:21
- Train brakes: Knorr air brakes, handbrakes
- Compressor: 1,500 L (400 US gal; 300 imp gal) / min
- Couplers: AAR knuckle (North Korea); SA3 coupler (USSR)
Performance figures
- Maximum speed: 80 km/h (50 mph)
- Power output: 471 kW (632 hp)
- Tractive effort
  - Starting: 205.9 kN (46,300 lbf)
  - Continuous: 112.0 kN (25,200 lbf)
Career
- Operators: Soviet Railways; Korean State Railway
- Class: (Soviet Union) SZhD: VME1 (ВМЭ1) (North Korea) KSR 150-series
- Number in class: SZhD: 310; KSR: 14
- Numbers: SZhD: ВМЭ1-001 to ВМЭ1-310; KSR: 151 to 164

The Ganz DVM-4 is a diesel-electric shunting locomotive developed and manufactured by Ganz-MÁVAG of Hungary in the mid-1950s to meet a requirement issued by the Soviet Railways (SZhD). It entered series production for SZhD in 1958, and was also supplied to the North Korean State Railway.

== General description ==
The DVM-4 was derived from the Ganz DVM-2, used by the Albanian Railways, the Bulgarian State Railways (Class 51), China Railway (Class ND15), the Czechoslovak State Railways (Class T 455), the Hungarian State Railways (Class M44), the Polish State Railways (Classes SM40 and SM41), the Yugoslav Railways (Class 641), and the Austro-Hungarian joint Raaberbahn.

The DVM-4 is of a hood-type design, with a cab at one end, external walkways around the engine compartment, and a welded steel frame. It has two-axle bogies with box beams and transverse pivot bars; the journal boxes have SKF roller bearings. Tractive and braking forces are transmitted via pins. The gearbox was set with a gear ratio of 73:21=3.476. The locomotive is equipped with Knorr air brakes and handbrakes; air for the brake system is supplied by an MK-135 three-cylinder, two-stage compressor. Brake pads are located at either side of each wheel.

The DVM-4 is powered by a Ganz-Jendrassik 16 JVF 17/24-type non-turbocharged (pre-chamber) V16 Diesel engine. The cylinders have a bore of 170 mm (6.7 in) and a stroke of 240 mm (9.4 in). The locomotive has four six-pole, series-wound TS32-44/14 traction motors with forced ventilation, axle-hung and nose-suspended.

== Soviet Union ==
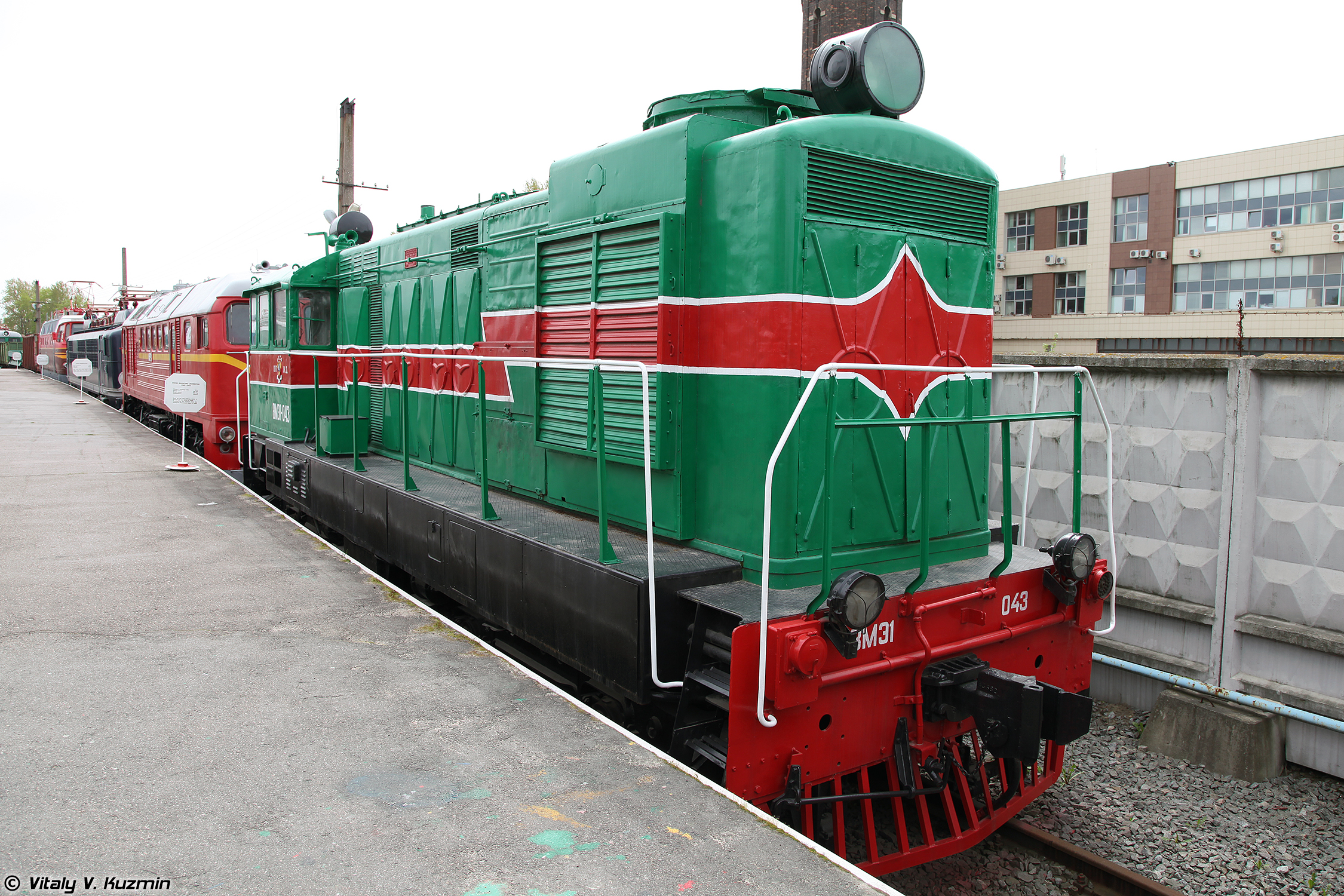
VME1-043 preserved at Saint Petersburg, Russia

In the 1950s the Soviet Union began a large-scale program to replace steam locomotives with diesel and electric traction. As domestic production of diesel shunting locomotives was just beginning, the decision was made to import such locomotives from Czechoslovakia and Hungarian People's Republic. Ganz-MÁVAG thus began work on a derivative of their successful DVM-2 design, modifying it to meet Soviet specifications, and in 1956 a prototype of the new locomotive was tested on the Moscow-Kursk-Donbass Railway.

After some further refinement, Ganz began deliveries to the Soviet Railways in 1958, who assigned the new locomotive the ВМЭ1 (VME1) class designation (В = венгерский, "Hungarian"; М = маневровый, "shunter", Э = электропередача, "electric transmission" 1 = first class of this category).

The first VME1-class locomotives to be delivered to the USSR were put into service in Leningrad to shunt passenger trains, as they were not powerful enough to work heavy freight trains. 310 units were delivered between 1958 and 1965, and they found work all over the USSR. On the Baltic Railway (encompassing the Estonian, Latvian and Lithuanian SSRs), they were used to haul light, local passenger trains around Tallinn and Riga, in addition to shunting. Some units were assigned to various railway lines in the Byelorussian, Moldavian and Ukrainian Soviet Socialist Republics.

The first VME1 locomotives were delivered to the Belarusian division of the Soviet Railways in May 1960, when VME1-040 and VME1-042 were assigned to the Minsk locomotive depot. Two more, VME1-047 and VME1-049, were assigned to the Gomel locomotive depot in June of the same year, and VME1-127 was assigned to the Brest depot in September 1961, and after a three-year pause, over 50 more were assigned to Belarusian depots.

In 1964 the SZhD received three very similar locomotives of works type DVM-7, which were designated ВМЭ2 (VME2) class; these had the same prime mover as the DVM-4, but upgraded to produce 589.4 kW (790 hp).

In 1968, VME1-024 was refitted with asynchronous traction motors and AC transmissions, and was reclassified ВМЭ1А (VME1A).

Most of the VME1 were retired between 1975 and 1985. VME1-043 is preserved at the railway museum at Saint Petersburg's Warsaw Station.

== North Korea ==
Fourteen DVM4 locomotives, identical to the Soviet Railways' VME1, were delivered new by Ganz to the Korean State Railway of North Korea in 1964; these were numbered 150 to 164. At least four were rebuilt at an unknown time by the Kim Chong-t'ae Electric Locomotive Works in P'yŏngyang, converting them to 3,000 V DC electric operation by removing the Diesel engine and adding a pantograph for current collection. In some cases they have retained their original numbers, but at least one has received an out-of-sequence number (001). Whether any of these locomotives is still operational in unrebuilt Diesel-powered form is unknown, but at least two of the converted electrics are still in use. Two liveries are known to have been applied to these locomotives: the standard light blue over dark green, and overall light blue with yellow lightning stripe.
