= BDZh Tovarni prevozi =

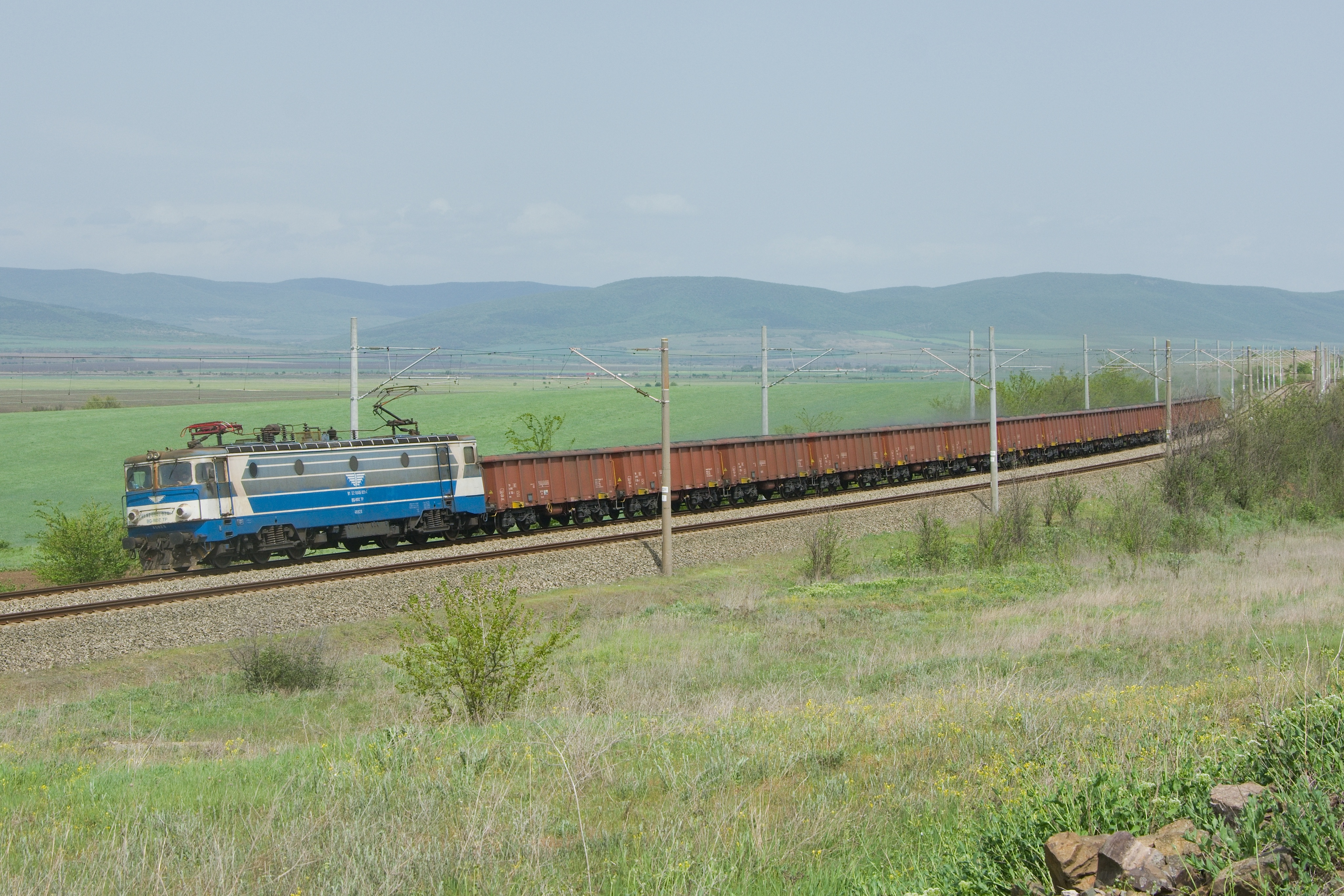
Freight train of BDZh Tovarni prevozi

BDZh Tovarni prevozi is the national rail freight business of Bulgaria, part of BDZ.

== History ==
By 2010, BDŽ Tovarnni Prevosi reportedly held a market share (by tonne-km) of 77.3% in the Bulgarian rail freight sector; during the following year, it transferred 11.57m tonnes of freight, roughly 70% of which was domestic traffic. By 2012, the company operated 220 locomotives along with a total rolling stock inventory of 4,859 vehicles; of these 164 locomotives and in excess of 3,000 wagons were in excess of 30 years old.

During the late 2000s and early 2010s, the government of Bulgaria undertook several efforts to restructure and reform the Bulgarian railway sector; these included the Lev 550m ($US 392.9m) capital increase to BDZ over six tranches between 2011 and 2016. The cash is intended to restructure the company by repaying some of its debts, which added to cost-reduction measures such as the disposal of some rolling stock assets and a reduction of its workforce. In May 2011, the government gave notice of a five year plan to subsidise the organisation's operations with the intent to returning it to fiscal viability around 2012; however, these plans were subject to a probe by the European Commission over allegedly insufficient compensatory measures to mitigate its negative impact on potential competitors, as well as doubts over the adequacy and uncertainty present in these restructuring plans. Approval for writing off the organisation's debt had already been given at the EU level.

On 12 June 2012, the Bulgaria's Privatisation and Post-Privatisation Control Agency issued a formal tender with the goal of privatising BDZ Tovarnni Prevosi; this move started the second attempt that the agency had made to privatise the freight operator. Under the terms set out, interest parties had 135 days from the tender's issuing to submit bids; it was publicly stated that between LEV 200-250 million ($128–160 million) was expected to be generated from the sale. During December 2012, it was reported that seven prospective bidders have expressed an interest and six potential investors had purchased tender documents; aside from one party based in neighbouring Romania, all of the interested parties were domestic companies.

During June 2013, it was announced that the privatisation initiative had been cancelled; this was reportedly due to BDZ having encountered difficulties with one of its creditors, which had led to shares in the company being frozen under a court order in February 2013 and thus they could not be released to any private entities. Furthermore, a new left-leaning coalition government had been formed only one month earlier, under the new transport minister, Danail Papazov, stated to the press that he sought to halt the privatisation process, and would instead aim to reform and stabilise the company underneath public ownership instead.

In the 2010s, BDŽ Tovarnni Prevosi pursued the development of international freight routes, such as an intermodal cargo service between Italy and Belgium. During early 2016, BDŽ commenced negotiations towards participating in the development of the Trans-Caspian International Transport Route (TITR) that would circumvent traditional east-west trade routes that traversed Russian territory; the initiative involved China, Kazakhstan, Azerbaijan, Georgia, and Turkey. In 2017, BDŽ Freight Transport received an official invitation to join the International Association for the TITR.

During the late 2010s, the renewal of BDZ's rolling stock inventory became an increasingly pressing priority. In April 2020, a deal was signed that covered the repairing of 50 freight wagons. In September of that year, BDZ launched a tender for the repair of a further 110 wagons.

During November 2019, it was announced that both the passenger and freight divisions of BDZ would be reorganised as standalone joint stock companies under the terms of an agreement with the Bulgarian Ministry of Transport, IT & Communications. . On 4 February 2022, Nikolay Sabev, the Minister of Transport & Communications, stated that the state-owned railway holding company BDZ Holding, its passenger BDZ Ptnicheski Prevozi, and BDZ Tovarni Prevozi had been formally reunited as one organisation.
