= PKP class SM40 =

Polish code-name for a Hungarian locomotive

SM40
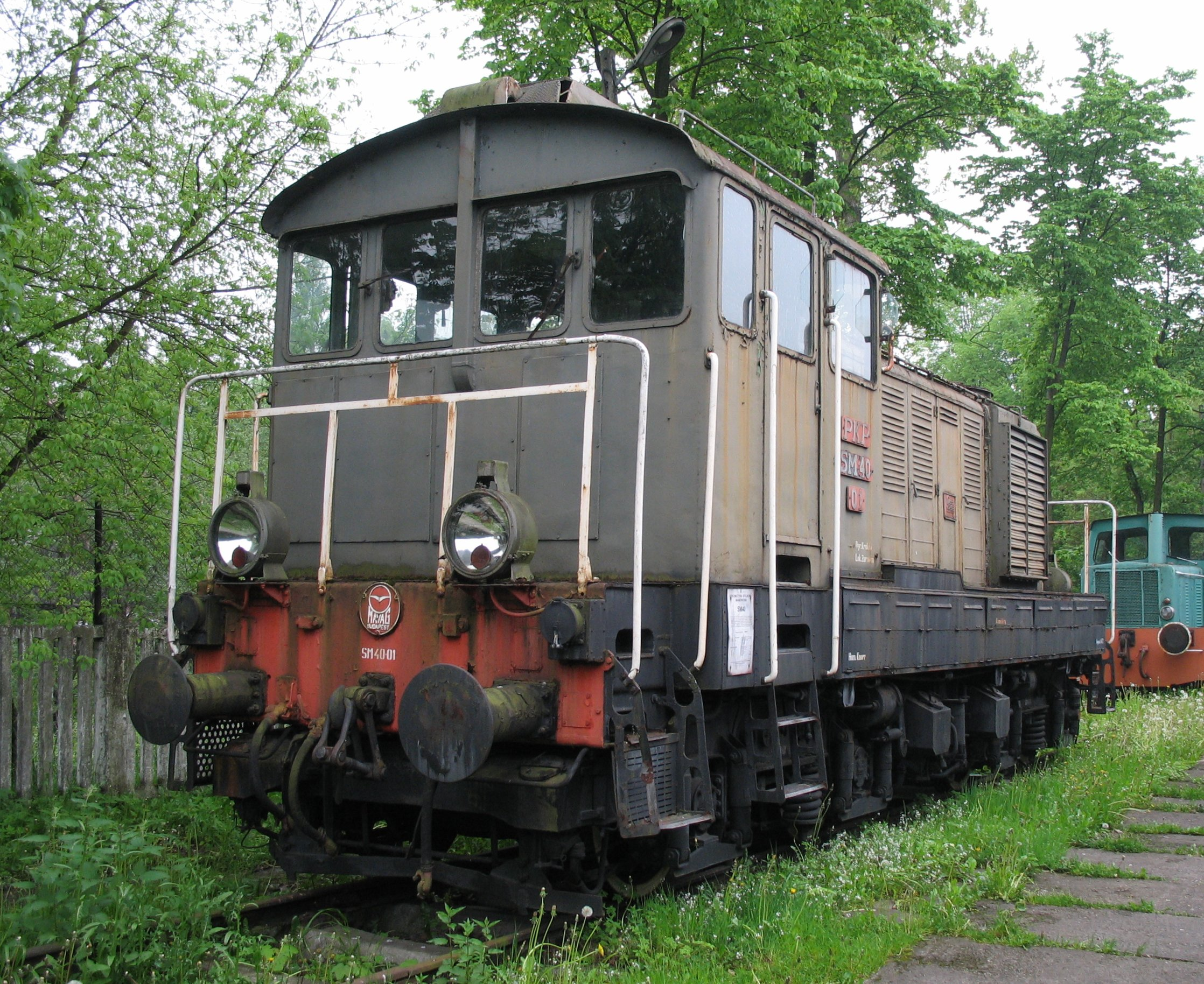
- SM40 locomotive
Type and origin
- Power type: Diesel
- Builder: Ganz–MÁVAG; Budapest
- Build date: 1956
Specifications
- Configuration
  - UIC: Bo′Bo′
- Gauge: 1,435 mm (4 ft 8 1/2 in)
- Driver dia.: 1,040 mm
- Length: 11,278 mm
- Width: 4,440 mm
- Loco weight: 61,67 t
- Engine type: XVIJV170/240
- Cylinders: 16
- Transmission: Electric
- Loco brake: Knorr
Performance figures
- Maximum speed: 80 km/h
- Power output: 441 kW
- Tractive effort: 182.6 kN
Career
- Operators: PKP
- Class: SM40

SM40 is a Polish code-name for a Hungarian shunting and maneuvering purpose diesel electric locomotive after export from Hungary to Poland and in service at PKP.

== History ==
SM40 were imported for the first time from Hungary in 1959, after tests at the distance of 2,185 km with cargo load of 156 t.

The first name for this loco was Lwe58, and in 1960 it was changed to SM40 (according to RN-58/MK0001 regulations).

Items delivered from 1961 had a few modifications, and a different code-name SM41.

== See also ==
- Polish locomotives designation
