= Bulgarian State Railways =

State railway company of Bulgaria

Bulgarian State Railways Holding
- Native name: Холдинг Български държавни железници
- Romanized name: Bâlgarski dâržavni železnici Holding
- Type: Government-owned corporation
- Industry: Transport
- Founded: 1888
- Headquarters: Sofia, Bulgaria
- Area served: Bulgaria
- Key people: Georgi Drumev
- Services: railway passenger and freight transportation
- Number of employees: 17867
- Website: www.bdz.bg

The Bulgarian State Railways (Bulgarian: Български държавни железници, romanized: Balgarski darzhavni zheleznitsi, abbreviated as БДЖ, BDZ or BDŽ) are Bulgaria's state railway company and former largest railway carrier in the country, established as an entity in 1888. The company's headquarters are located in the capital Sofia. Since the 1990s, the BDŽ has met serious competition from automotive transport. Up to 2002 the company also owned/managed the state railway (up to 2,485 miles (3,999 km) total of 1,435 mm (4.708 ft) & 760 mm (2.49 ft) (Septemvri to Dobrinishte only) track gauge railway tracks) infrastructure in the country, when according to EU regulations a new state company, the National Railway Infrastructure Company, was founded and became the owner of the infrastructure.

Bulgaria is a member of the International Union of Railways (UIC). The UIC Country Code for Bulgaria is 52.

== History ==
On 1 January 2002, the new Railway Transport Act entered into force, passed by the National Assembly of the Republic of Bulgaria, according to which the National Company Bulgarian State Railways were split into two separate enterprises – a railway carrier (Bulgarian State Railways EAD) and an infrastructure enterprise (Railway Infrastructure National Company)

The European Commission formally warned Bulgaria in May 2010 for failure to implement the First Railway rules on track access charges. In October 2010 further restructuring was announced, with BDŽ EAD becoming a holding company, and all rolling stock allocated to passenger & freight subsidiaries.

== Company structure ==
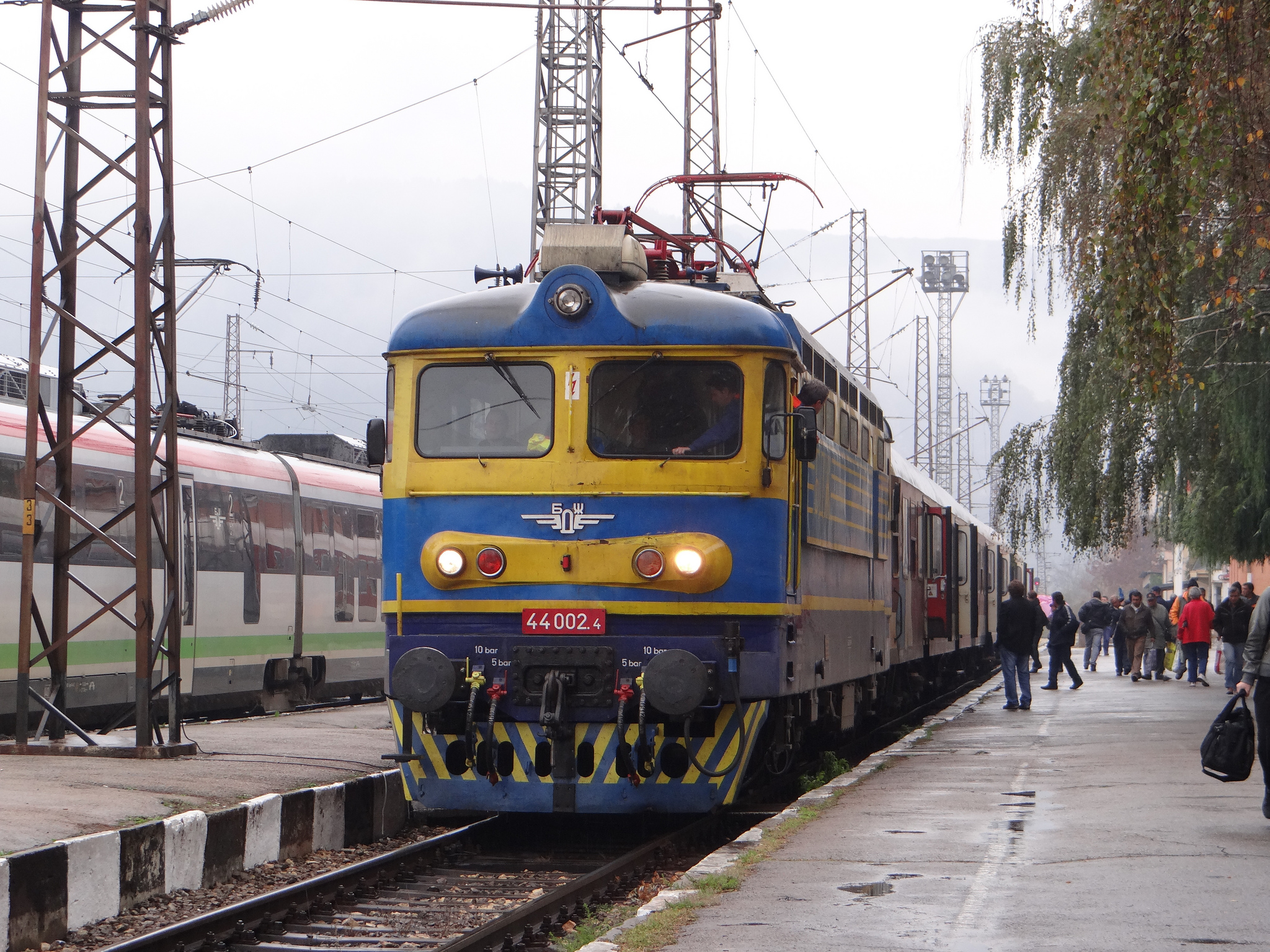
BDZ trains at Pernik railway station

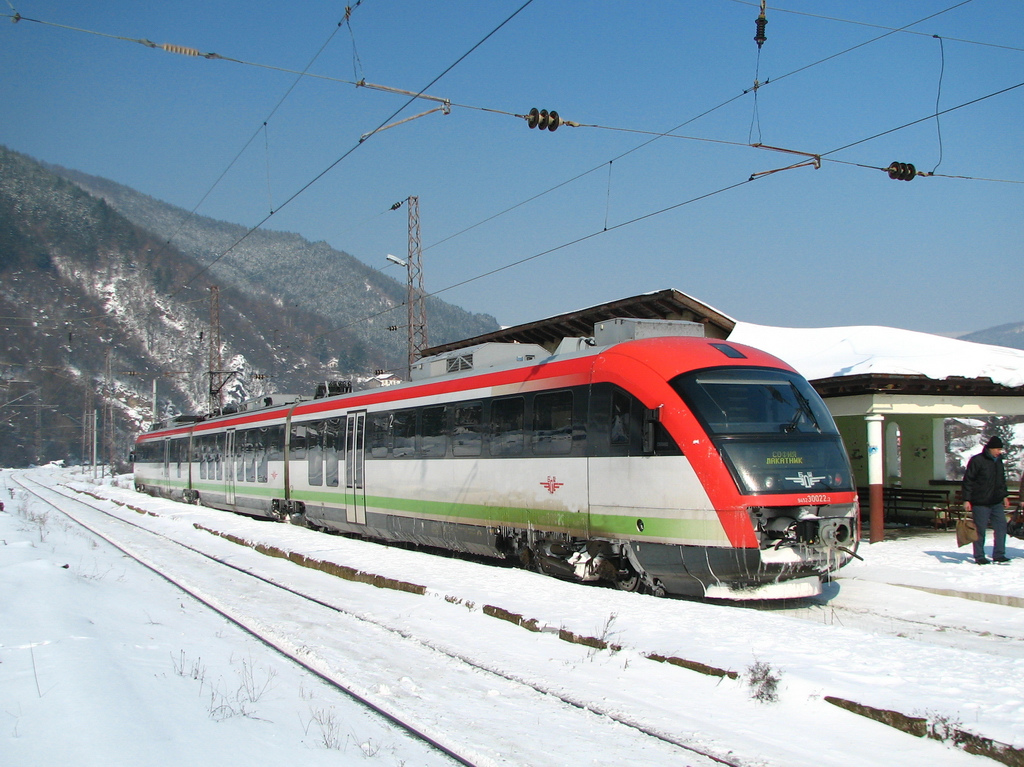
Siemens Desiro

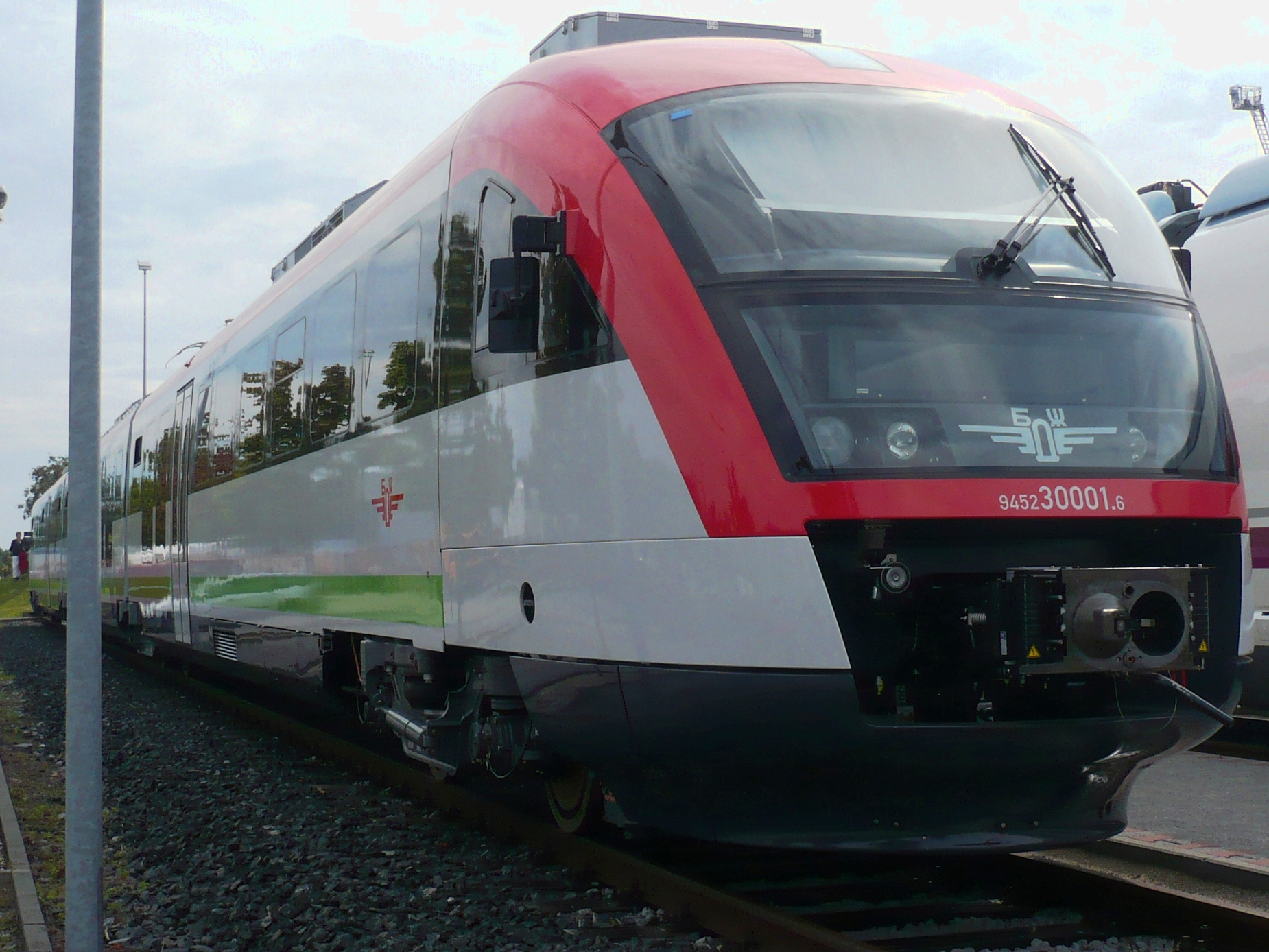
Siemens Desiro

Since the last reforms in 2007, a new organisational structure has been approved.

BDŽ Inc. (a holding company with one shareholder, the Republic of Bulgaria)

- BDŽ Passenger transportations (БДЖ - Пътнически превози) - responsible for the passenger services. The company carried 21.3 million passengers in 2019.
- BDŽ Freight Transportations (БДЖ – Товарни превози) - Freight operations and expedition with subsidiary BDZ SPED Ltd. The company carried 13.3 million tonnes of freight in 2009 in 3.1 million tonne-kilometers. Privatisation was attempted in 2012, but called off in 2013 due to financial problems.
- BDŽ Traktzionen Podvizhen Sustav Ltd. - locomotive management and servicing.
- BDŽ-Koncar Inc. - joint venture between BDŽ EAD {Bulgarian State Railways single-member joint-stock company} and KONČAR Group from Croatia with main scope of work locomotive repairs and modernization.

Still there are many problems with the organisational structure of the holding. There is an evident lack of effectiveness in the administration and the main goal of the Ministry of Transport, Information Technologies and Telecommunication is to make the company profitable.

== Train ==
The National rail carrier offered its customers medium and long-distance travel with the following passenger train categories:

fast train with mandatory booking (БВЗР, RБВ);
fast train (БВ);
passenger train (ПВ)
suburban passenger train (КПВ) and
international express (МБВ).

Fast trains with mandatory booking (БВЗР) were direct descendants of the last commercial category – "express". Fast train timetables with mandatory booking were compiled based on a thorough analysis of the current traffic on major railways. Basically and inviolably rules when developing the schedule of high-speed trains with mandatory reservation is a condition that they stop at a minimum number of stations, which ensure that they move as quickly as possible from point A to point B along the route. For the express traffic of this category of trains, the good technical condition of traction and rolling stock, which has a railway operator, is also important.

In 2017 (from July 1, 2017) for the first time in the history of Bulgarian State Railways and thanks mainly to the renovated with European funds of the 1st and 8th RAILWAY lines, it became possible to release another fast train БВЗР with a maximum speed of 150 km / h. These are the BVZR "Sunny Beach", which for this purpose serves promoted to Končar Ellok – Zagreb electric locomotives of the 46 200 series and with cars of the 21 – 50 series (second – class coupes), 10 – 50 (first – class coupes) and 84 – 9784-97 (bistro car).

== Current traction ==
- List of BDŽ locomotives

Class	Manufacturer	Traction Type	Notes
06	Electroputere – Craiova	Diesel-electric	
07	Luganskteplovoz	Diesel-electric	Ludmilla (locomotive) The most famous locomotives built in the Soviet Union. Same as DB Class 232
10	Siemens	DMU-2	Desiro Modern diesel-hydraulic multiple-units.
30	Siemens	EMU-3	Desiro Modern 3 car electric multiple units
31	Siemens	EMU-4	Desiro 4 car version of class 30
32	RVR Riga	EMU-4	Soviet built EMUs. Soviet class ЭР25 (ER25)
33	RVR Riga	EMU-4	Soviet built EMUs. Soviet class ЭР33 (ER33)
34	Škoda Works	EMU-4	
35	Alstom	EMU-6	
42.1	Škoda Works	Electric	
43	Škoda Works	Electric	
44	Škoda Works	Electric	Same as Class 43, but with electro-dynamic braking.
45	Škoda Works	Electric	Same as Class 44. Re-geared for 110 km/h operation for freight trains.
46/46.2	Electroputere – Craiova	Electric	The LE5100 are the most powerful locomotives in use by BDŽ. Similar to CFR class 40.
51	Ganz	Diesel	Similar to ZS Class 641 and MÁV Class M44.
52	VEB Lokomotiv und Electrotechnische Werke	Diesel-hydraulic	DB Class V 60.
55	FAUR	Diesel-hydraulic	The biggest number of locomotives in the BDŽ fleet.
61	Škoda Works	Electric	Shunter and light service loco. Famous amongst railfans in Bulgaria due to rarity (≈20 units) of locomotive.
66	Humboldt-Deutzmotoren A.G.	Diesel-hydraulic	Sofia Depot has one locomotive of the class, which had to be restored for shunting service in the depot, but works were stopped due to lack of financing. DR Class V20.
75	Henschel & Son	Diesel-hydraulic	760 mm (2 ft 5 15/16 in) gauge locomotives used on the Septemvri – Dobrinishte tourist-attraction line.
77	FAUR	Diesel-hydraulic	760 mm (2 ft 5 15/16 in) gauge locomotive.
81	Камбарский машиностроительный завод (Kambarka Engineering Works)	Diesel-hydraulic	760 mm (2 ft 5 15/16 in) gauge shunting locomotive. Soviet class ТУ7 (TU7)

== Gallery ==
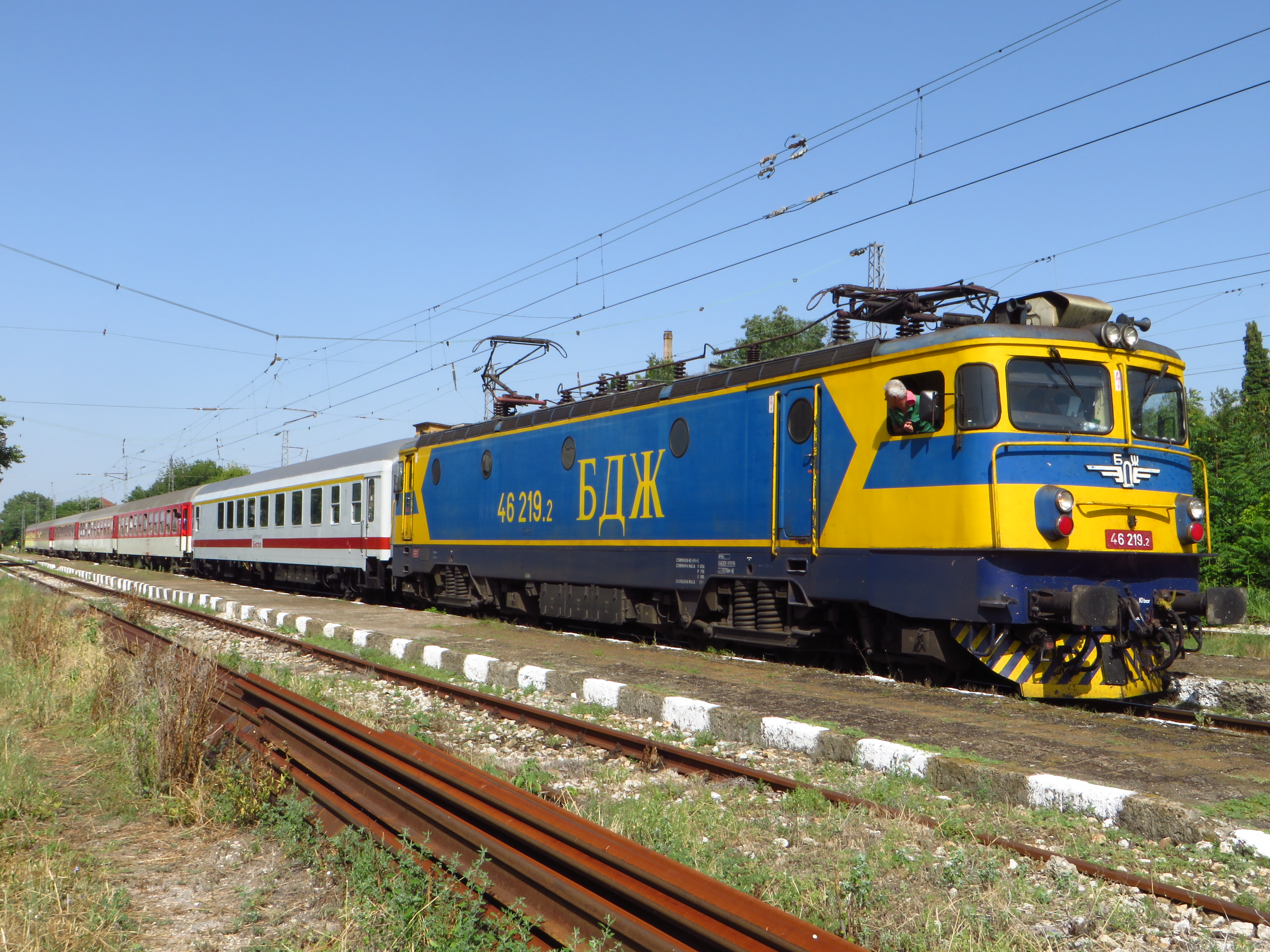
46 219.2

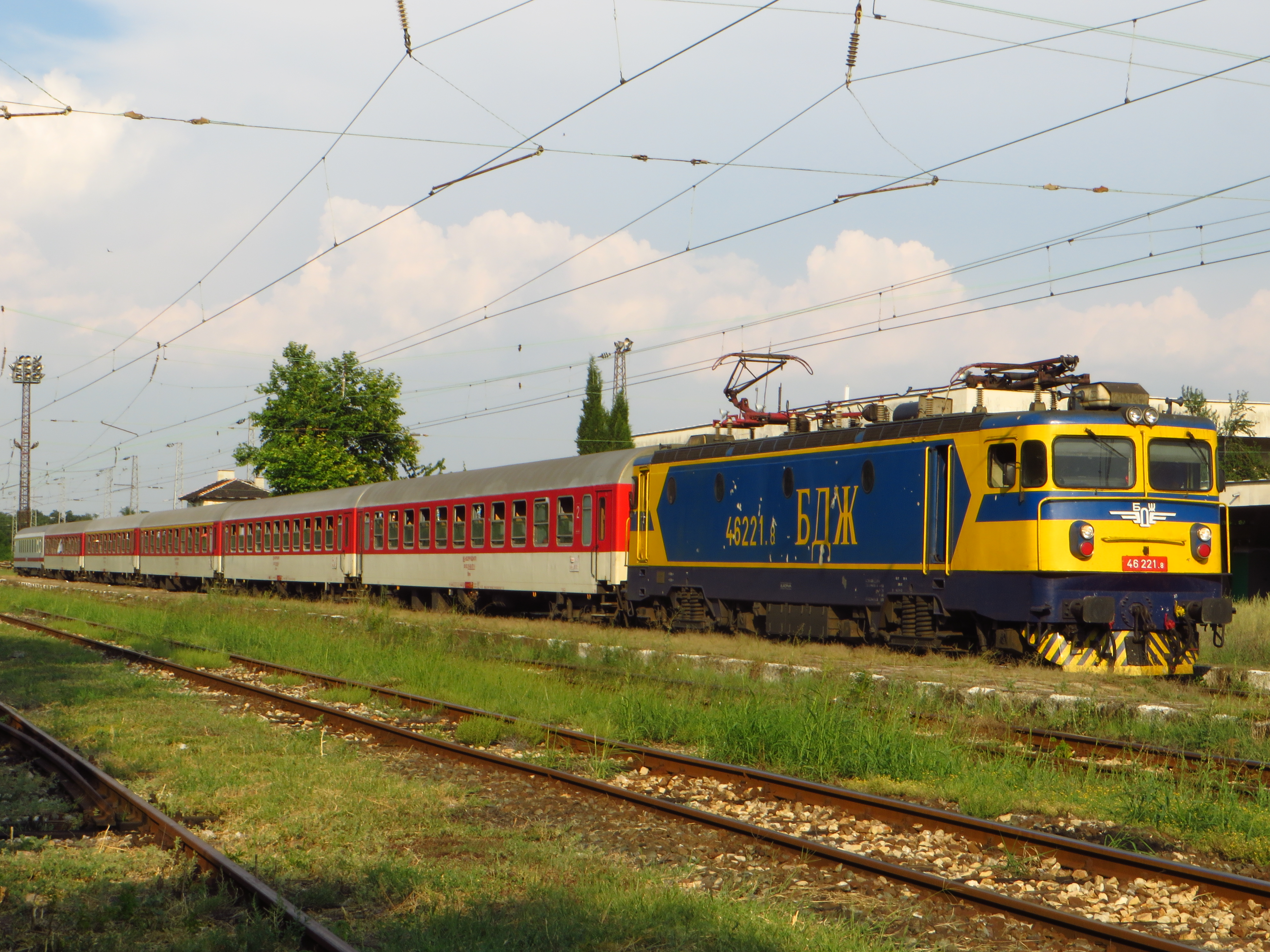
46 221.8

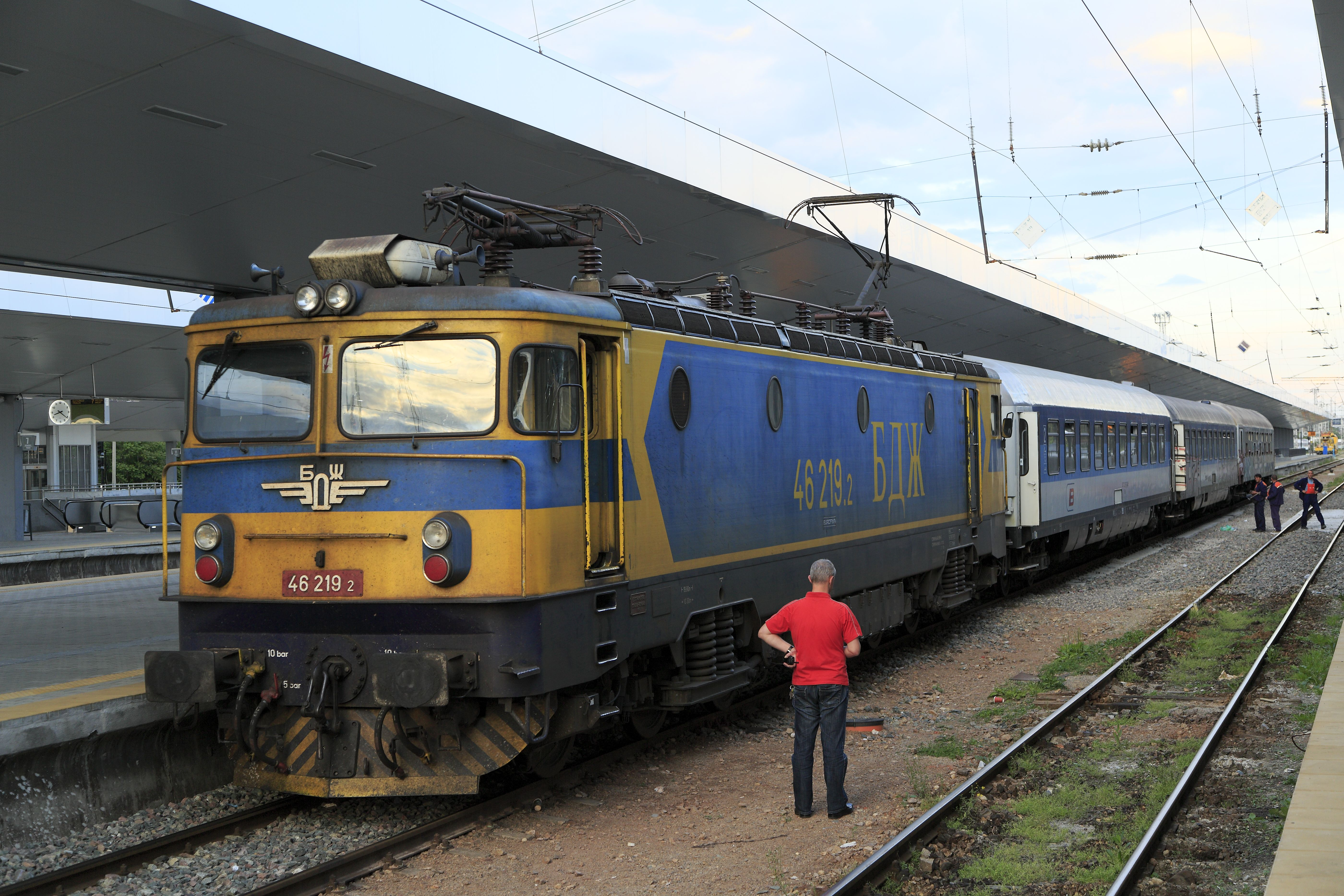
46 219.2

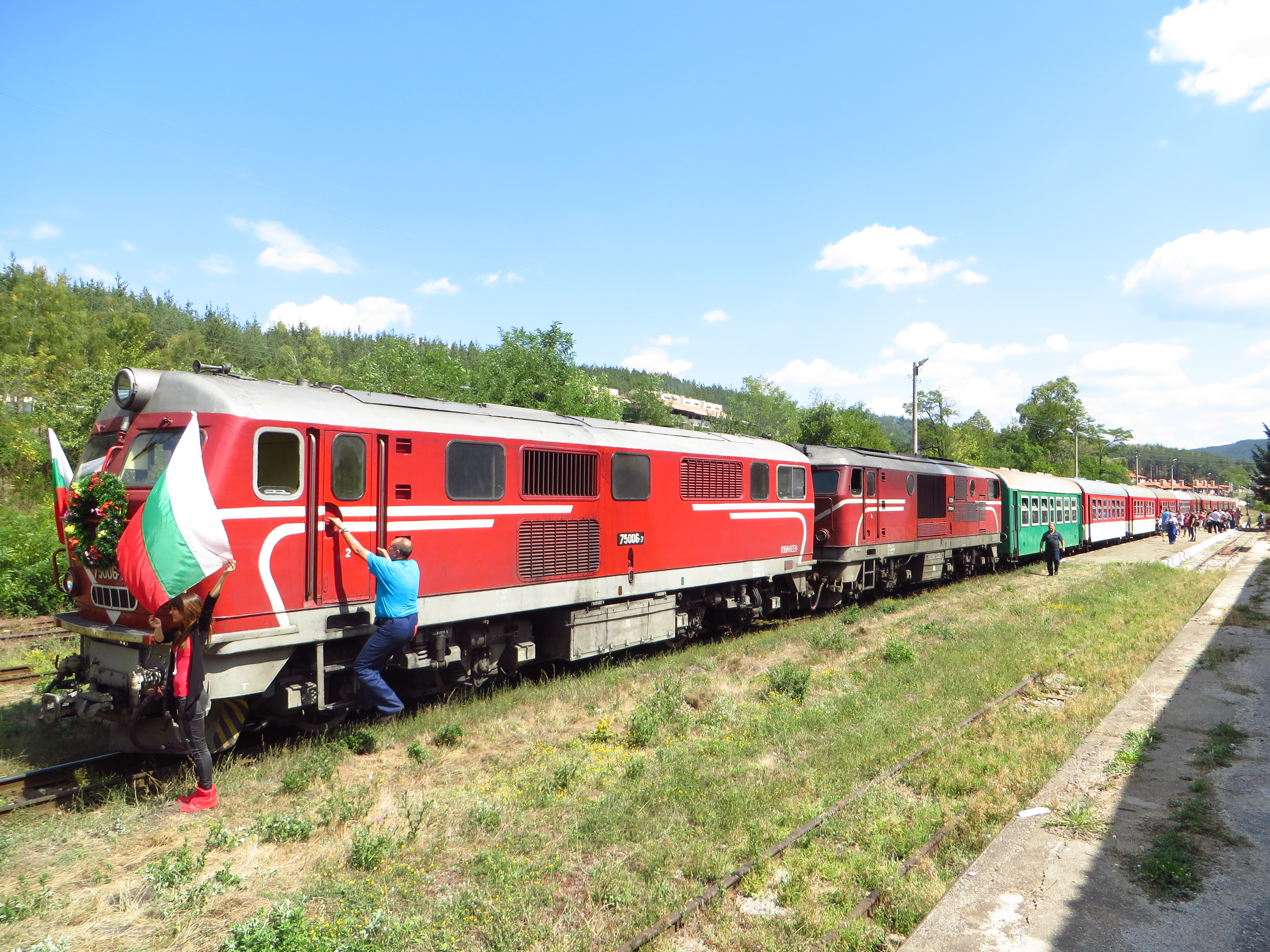
75 006.7 + 77 009.9

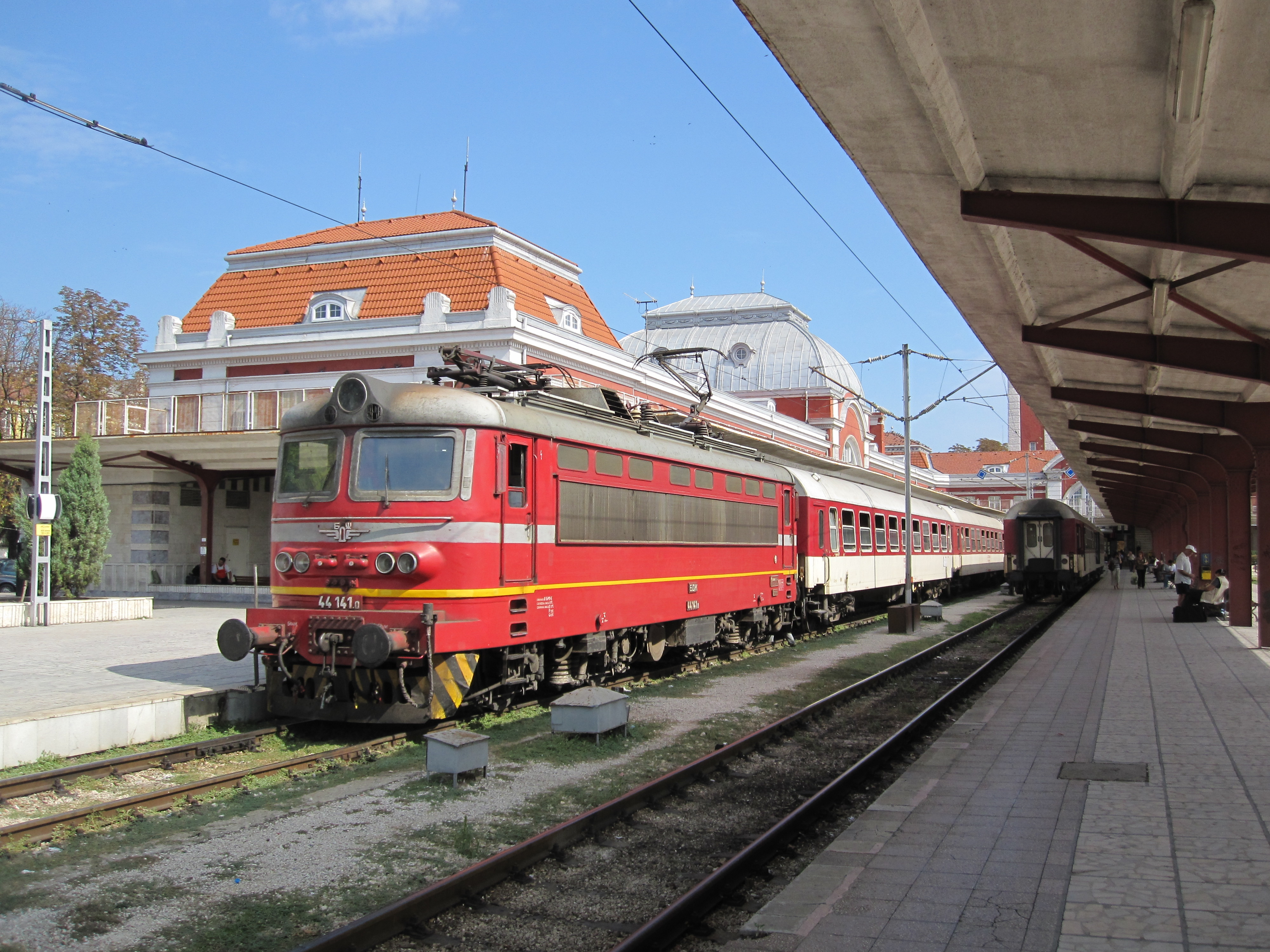
44 141

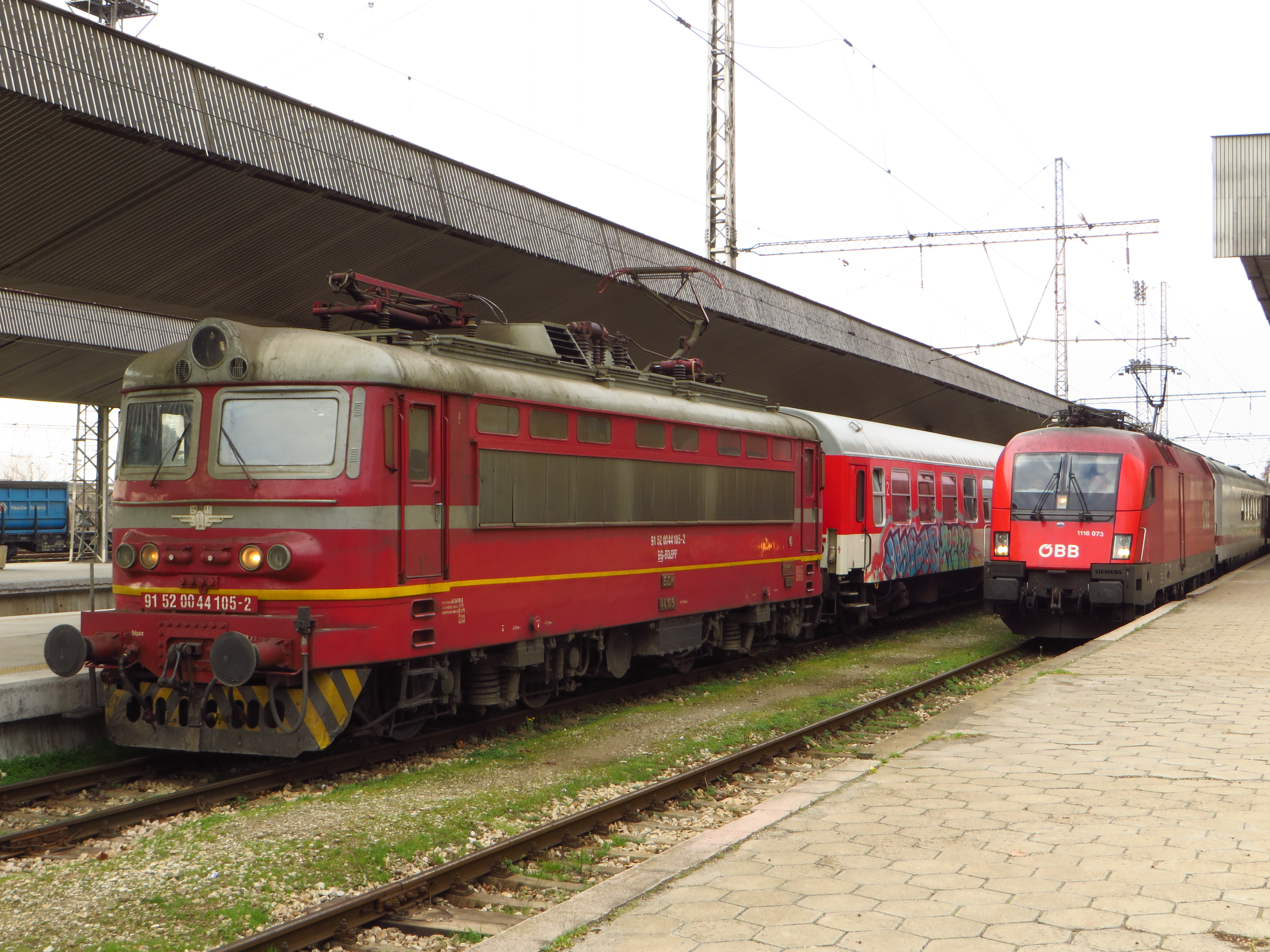
44 105.5

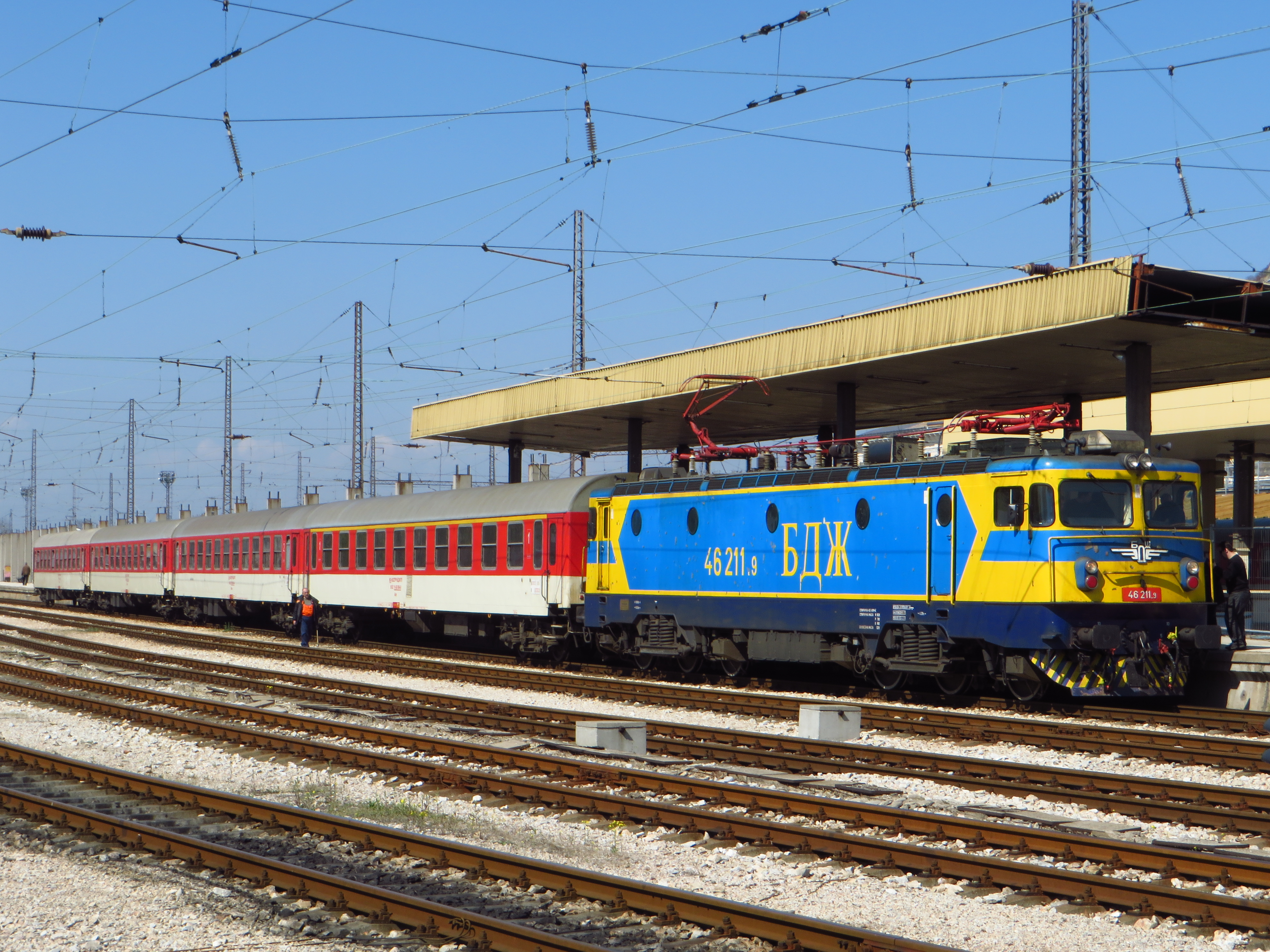
46 211.9

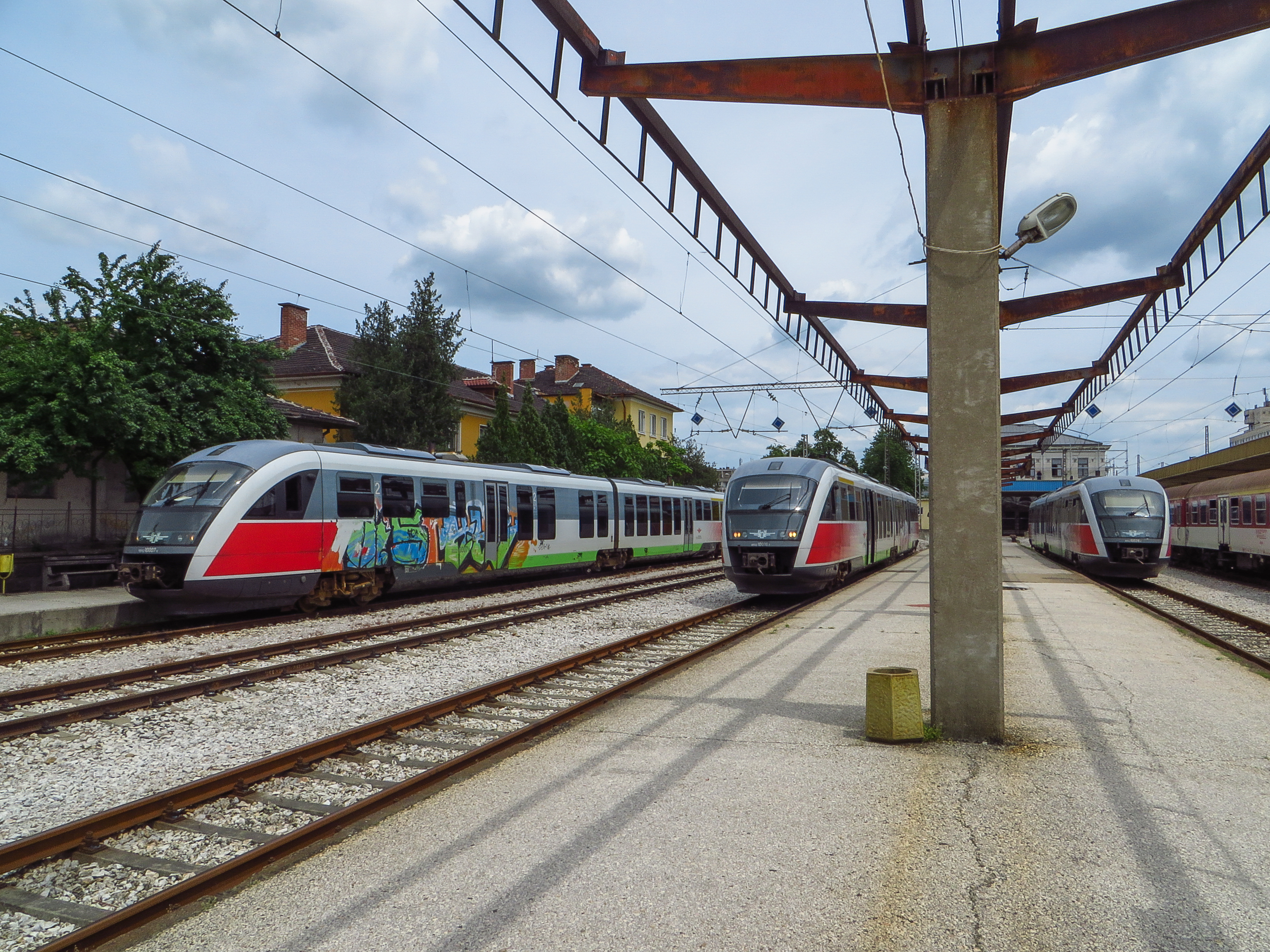
3 x Siemens Desiro DMU;

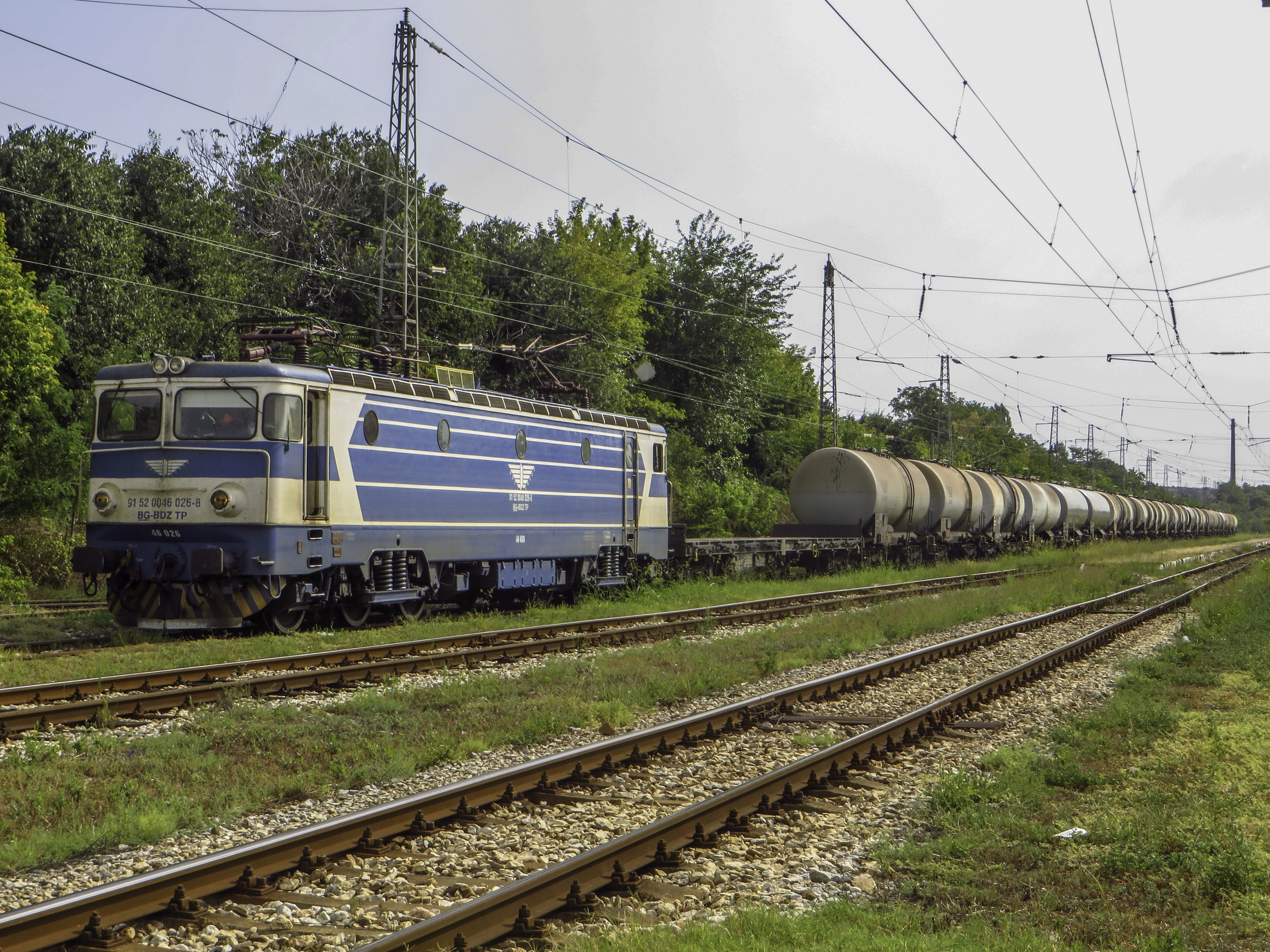
ТОВ (BDZ Cargo)

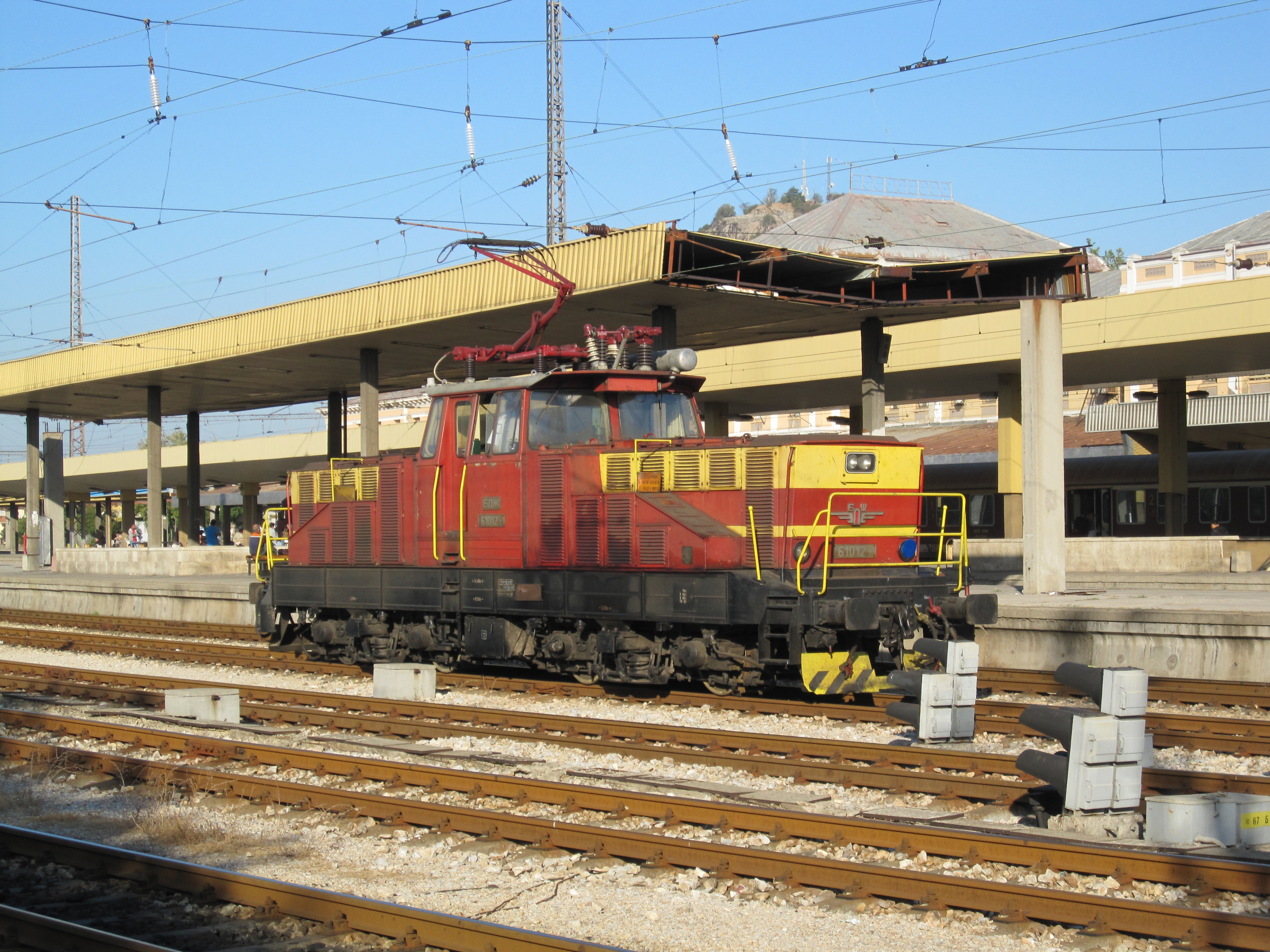
61 012

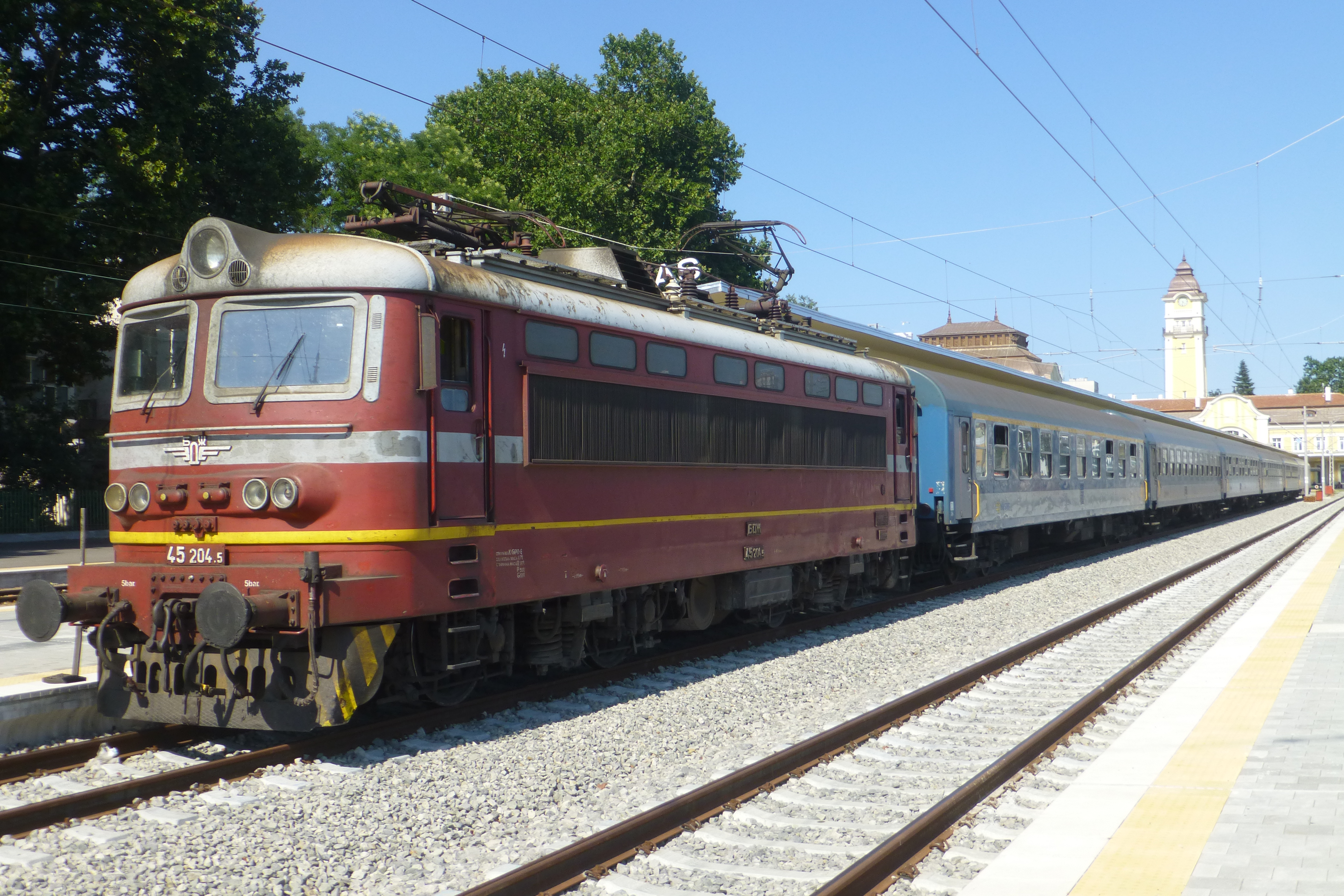
45 204.5

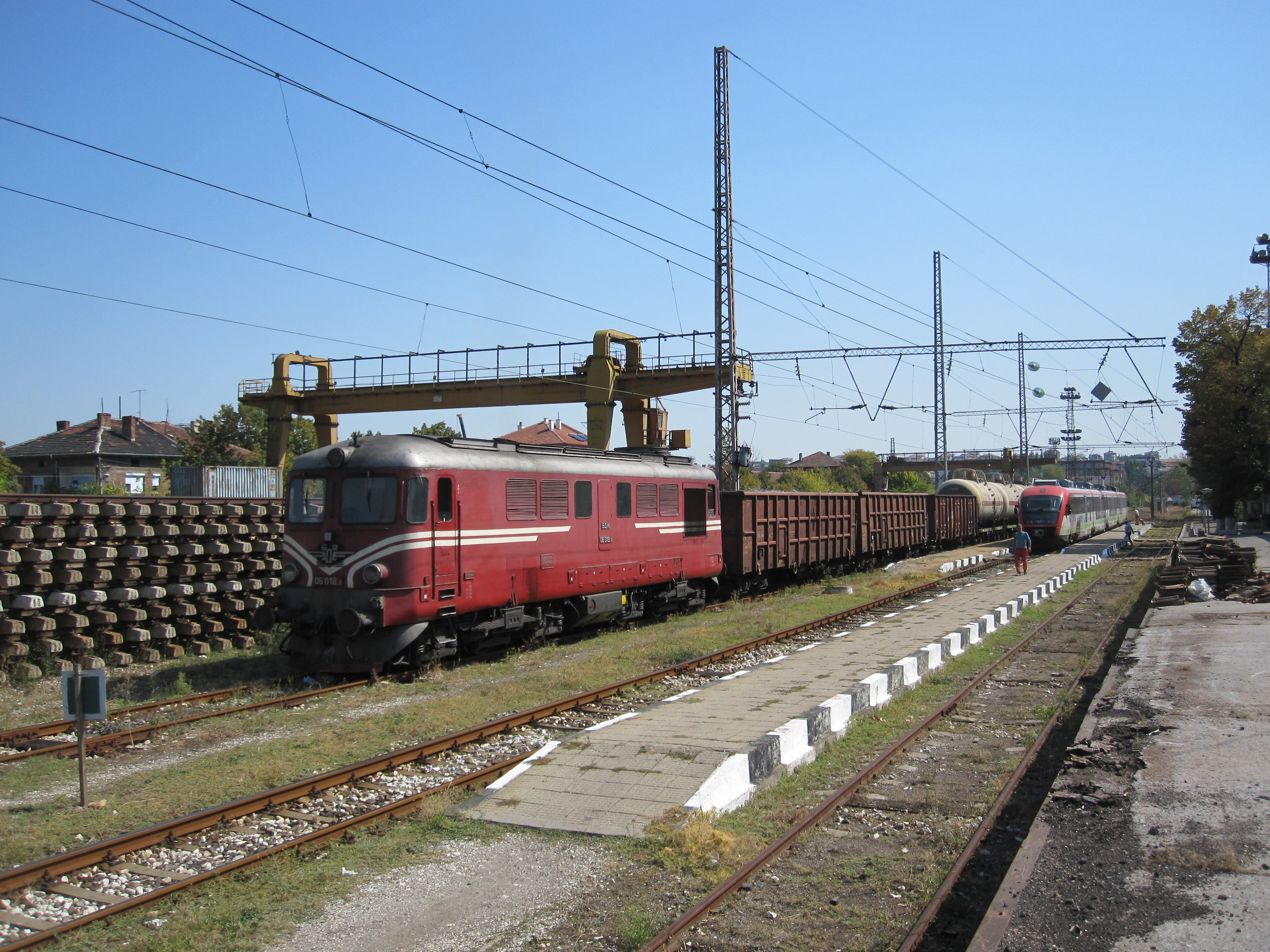
06 018

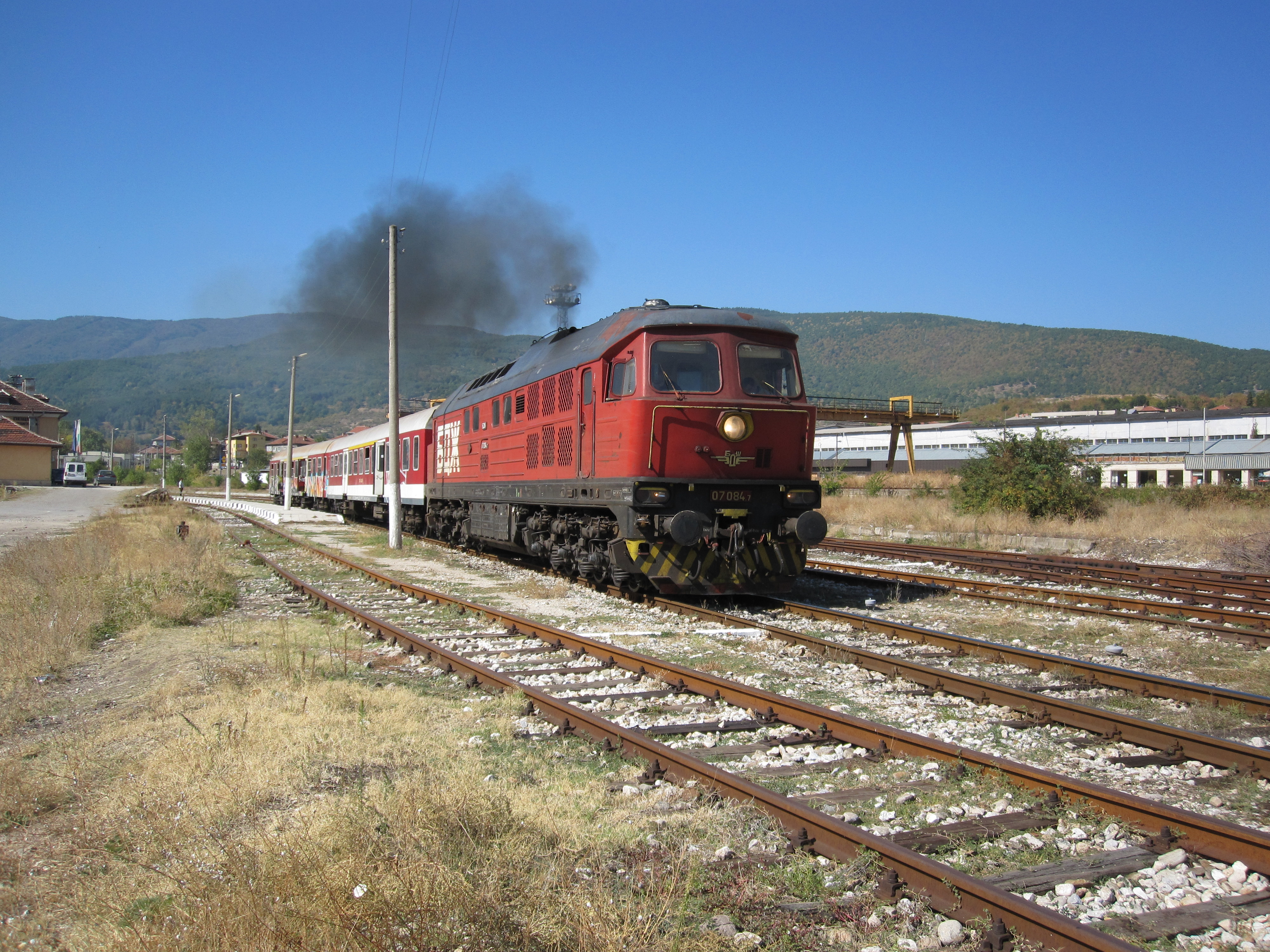
07 084

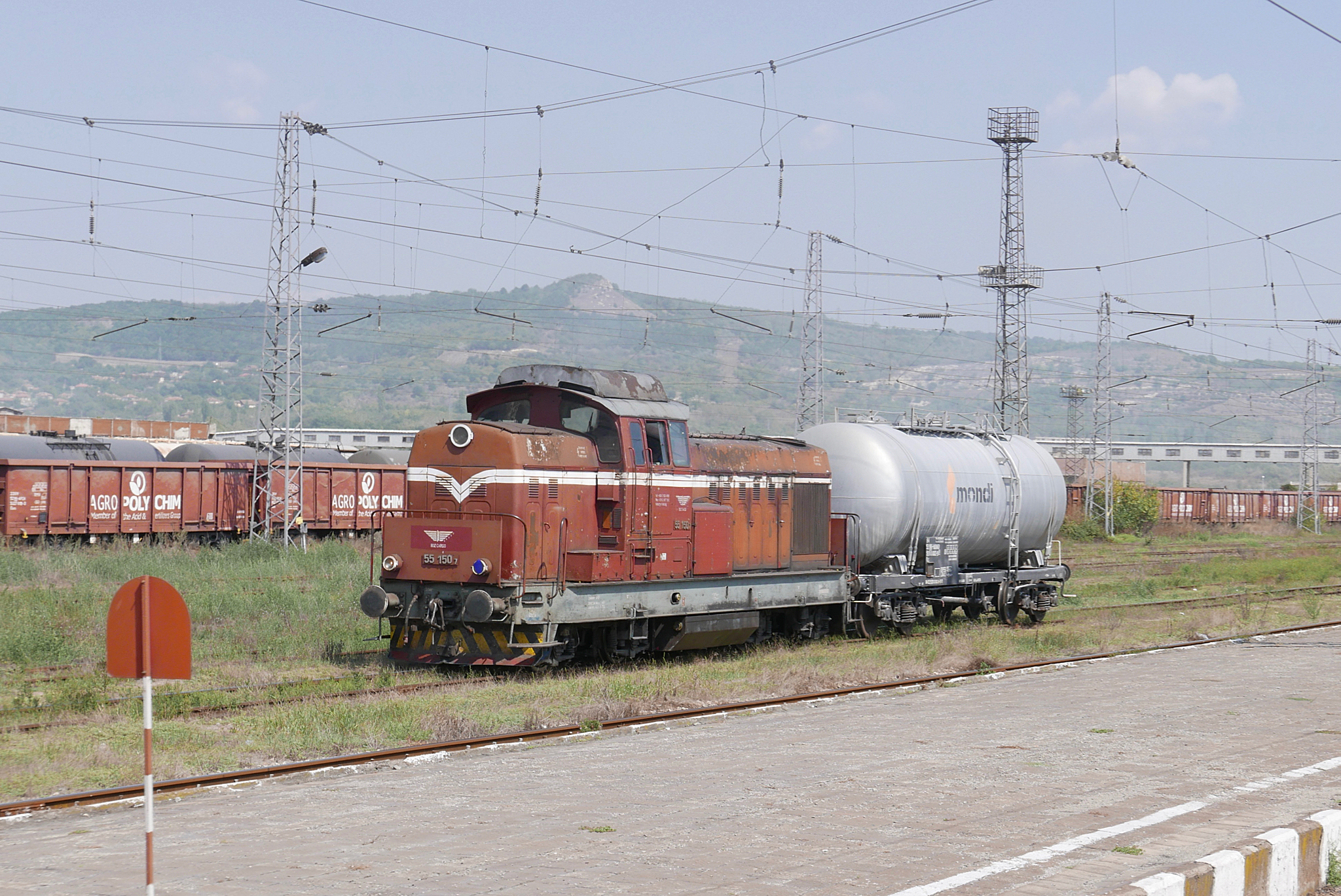
55 150.7

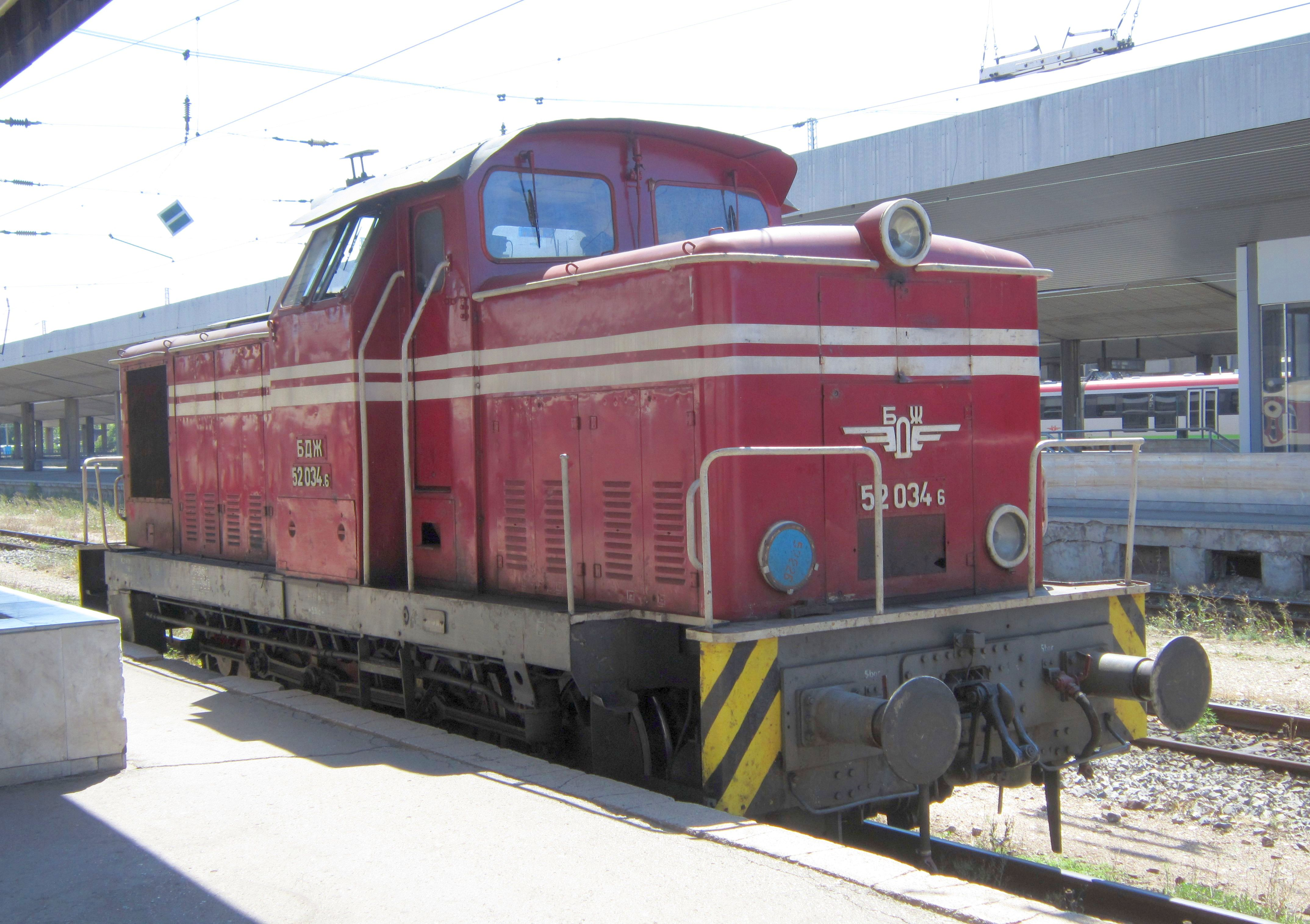
52 034

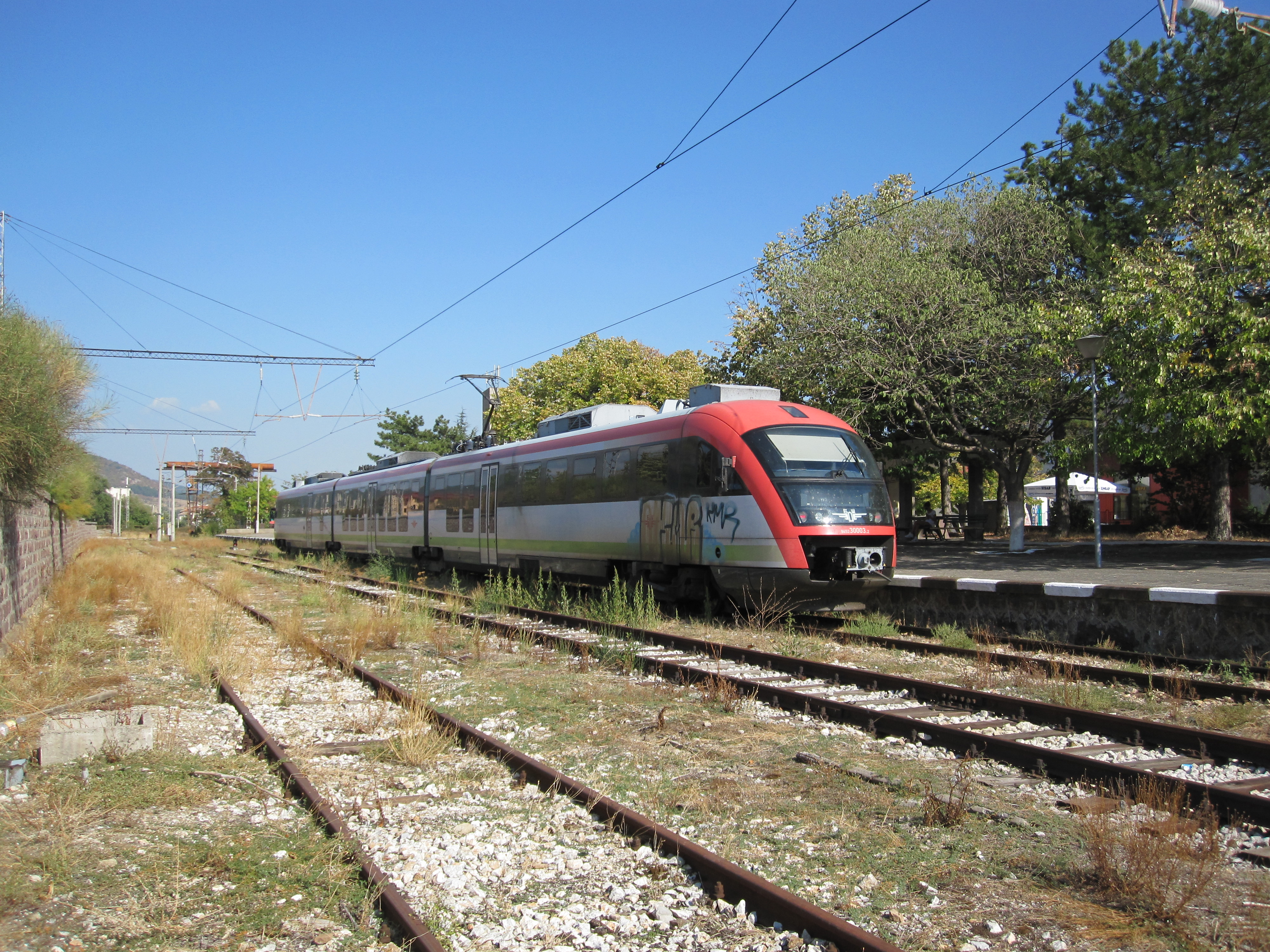
30 003

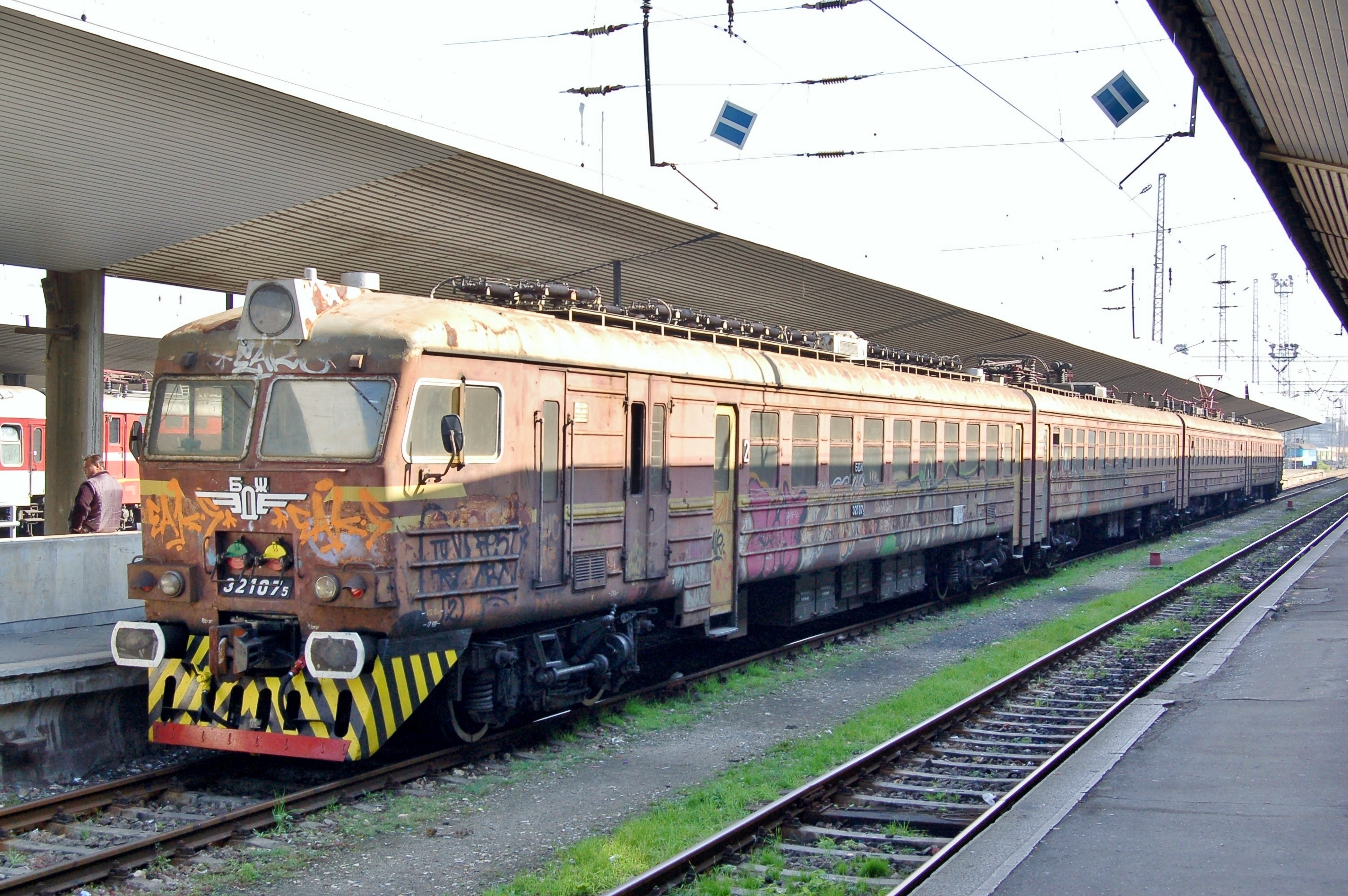
32 107.5
