= MÁV Class M44 =

MÁV M44
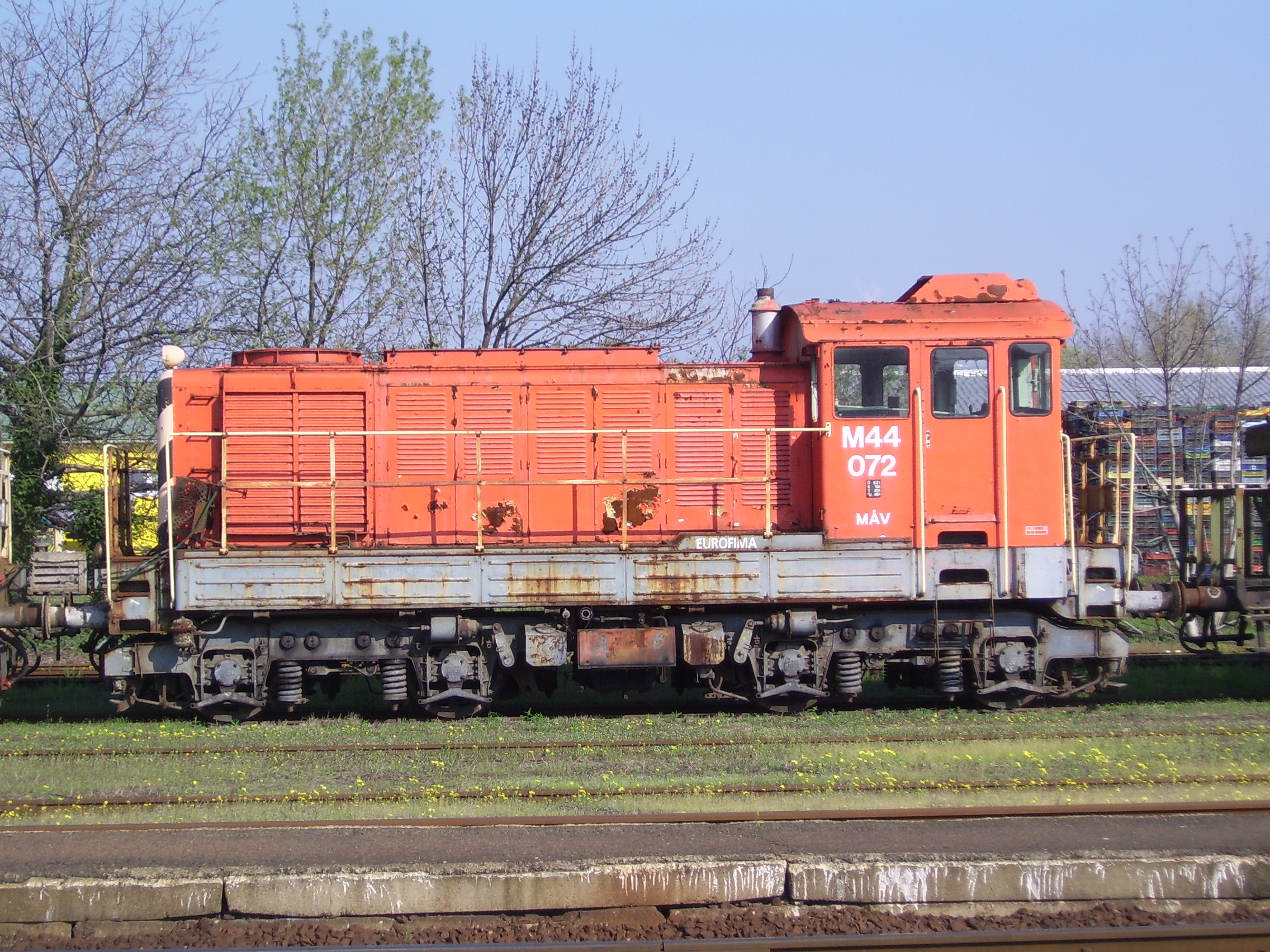
- M44.072
Type and origin
- Power type: Diesel
- Builder: Ganz–MÁVAG
- Model: DVM-2
- Build date: 1954–1976
- Total produced: 926
Specifications
- Configuration
  - AAR: B-B
  - UIC: Bo′Bo′
- Gauge: 1,435 mm (4 ft 8 1/2 in)
- Wheel diameter: 1,040 mm (40.94 in)
- Length: 11,278 mm (37 ft 0 in)
- Width: 3,132 mm (10 ft 3 in)
- Height: 4440 mm
- Loco weight: 62 t (136,700 lb)
- Fuel capacity: 1 t
- Prime mover: Ganz–Jendrassik XVI Jv 170/240
- Aspiration: Naturally aspirated
- Cylinders: 16
- Cylinder size: 170×240 mm
- Transmission: Electric
- Loco brake: Knorr
- Train brakes: Air
Performance figures
- Maximum speed: 80 km/h (50 mph)
- Power output: 441 kW (590 hp)
- Tractive effort: 182.6 kN (41,050 lbf)
Career
- Operators: MÁV, MÁV-HÉV, PKP, BDŽ, HŽ, ŽS
- Class: M44 (MÁV); SM40-SM41 (PKP)
- Number in class: 195 (MÁV), 273 (PKP), 132 (BDŽ),

MÁV Class M44 is a Hungarian shunting engine built from 1954 to 1971, and used by multiple railways, including Hungarian State Railways (MÁV), Polish State Railways (PKP), Bulgarian State Railways (BDŽ), Yugoslav Railways (JŽ), and some industrial railways in the former countries of the Eastern Bloc.

All versions used the Ganz–Jendrassik XVI Jv 170/240 V16 4-stroke naturally aspirated diesel engine producing 600 HP (420 kW).

== History ==
The Hungarian railway system was in a very bad shape after the ending of the war, and modernisation became important for MÁV. Ganz has built 2 generator locomotives for the suburban electrified railways during the war. MÁV needed a heavy shunting locomotive to replace the previously used old and obsolete steam locomotives, with relatively high power and acceleration. Ganz has designed a diesel electric locomotive with the then-biggest series built engine made by them, the Ganz XVI Jv 170/240. The first 2 prototypes were built in 1954, and they got the designation M424 5001 and 5002. After the good results of the tests, mass production had started. Other railways bought from this design, with similar results. After nearly 70 years, the original prototypes are still operational, and the class is still in active service, albeit with decreasing numbers.

== See also ==
- Polish locomotives designation
