= Mladost, Sofia =

District of Sofia, Bulgaria

Mladost Младост
- District of Sofia
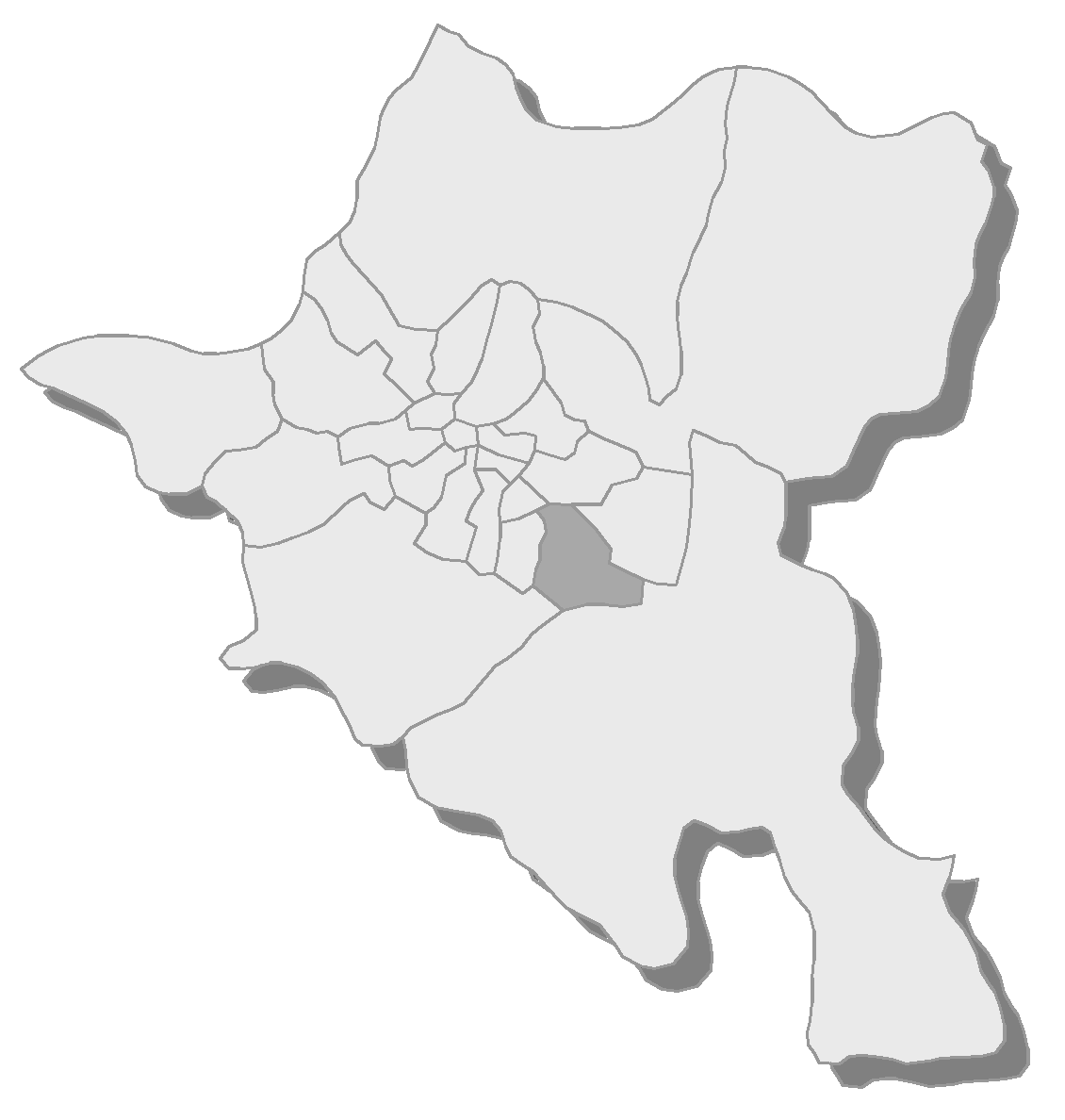
- Location of Mladost within Sofia
- Coordinates: 42°38′38″N 23°22′39″E
- Country: Bulgaria
- Province: Sofia City
- Municipality: Stolichna

Mladost (Bulgarian: Младост, meaning "Youth") is a district of Sofia. It is one of the most modern and fast developing areas in the city. As of 2021 it has 104,047 inhabitants which makes it the second-most-populous district in the capital, situated in the south-east end of Sofia, between Druzhba and Vitosha mountain. The largest business complex in Bulgaria is situated in the south end: Business Park Sofia. Mladost is among the safest and cleanest districts of Sofia. In May 2011 it became one of the first neighbourhoods of Sofia to have a complete cycling route of more than 8 km.

== Economy ==
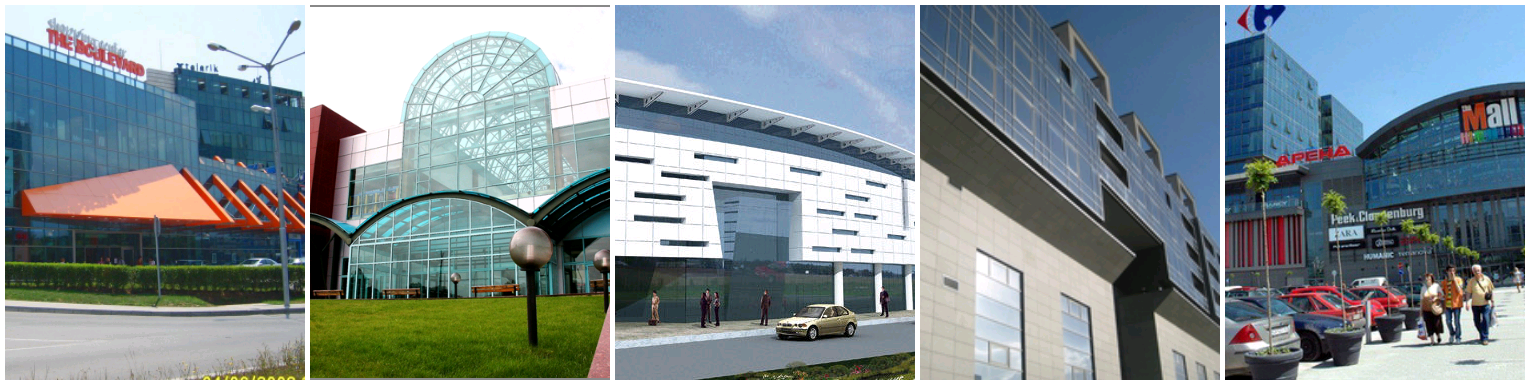
Small part of the business buildings in Mladost

The district has a flourishing economy. There are two industrial and scientific zones, "Iztok" and "Gorublyane". "Iztok" has an area of 201 ha and specialises in the production of electronics, machinery and press industry. There are a number of important scientific institutes including the Institute of Hydrology and Meteorology; Library Institute; Institute of Electronics; Institute of Astronomy; Institute of Physics of the Solid Objects; Institute of nuclear Energy and Nuclear Research; Central Laboratoty of Solar and Alternative Energy and others. The other zone is located near to the "Gorublyane" neighbourhood. There are food-processing factories and an Institute of Brewery and Hops Production.

The service sector is very important. There are 11 hypermarkets (Metro, Kaufland, Billa, Praktiker, Fantastico, COMO, Technopolis, Technomarket and others); several trade centres; many office buildings, supermarkets and different automobile dealerships such as Toyota, BMW, Volvo, Opel; 3,268 trade shops. Several business centres are planned or under construction. The unemployment in the district is 4,2%, some of the lowest in the country.

== Transport ==
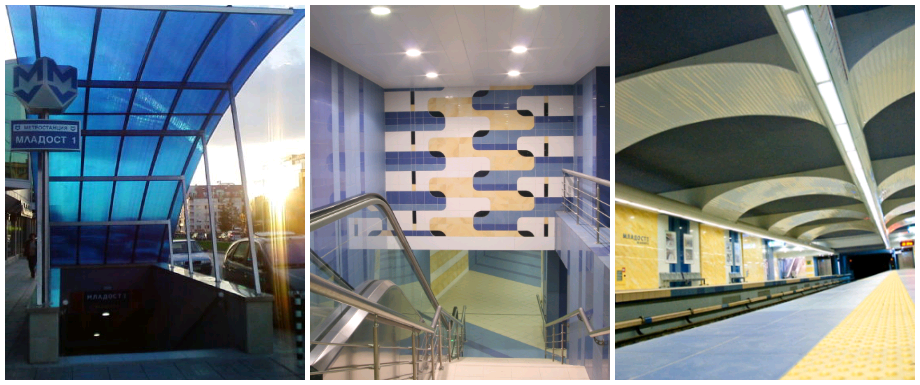
Mladost 1 Metro Station

The roads on the territory of the district are generally in good condition. The public transport includes bus and trolley lines as well as fixed route taxis. A great improvement to the transport system has been made, due to the Sofia Metro (Mladost 1, Mladost 3, Aleksandar Malinov, Akad. Aleksandar Teodorov - Balan and Business Park Sofia), which eases the communication with the central and western neighbourhoods of the city. There are five bus lines and two trolley line connecting the different parts of the quarter to the center of Sofia.

T 5 Mladost 1 - zh.k. Nadezhda
T 8 Hospital "St. Anna" - zh.k. Goce Delchev

== Education and health ==
There are 15 schools and 16 kindergartens in Mladost as well as 4 chitalishta. Around 10,100 pupils attend the schools and 1,800 children attend the kindergartens. Amongst the schools in the area is the American College of Sofia, the oldest United States educational institution, situated outside of the US. Officially, the college's address is in Mladost 2.

The district has 4 polyclinics and the Metropolitan Oncology Dispensary. The most important hospital is "Sveta Anna" (Saint Anna) with around 900 beds.

== Image gallery ==
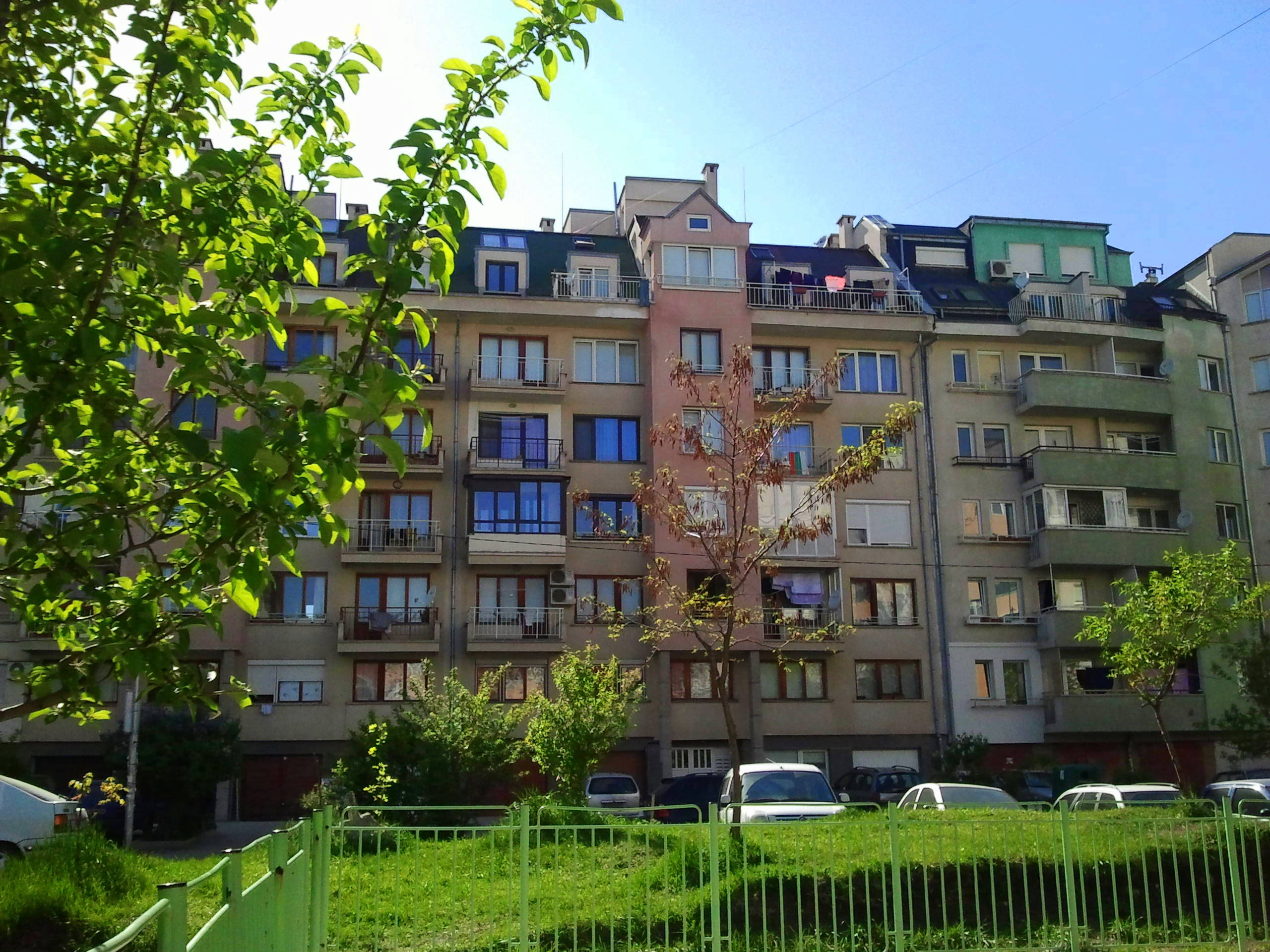
Apartment block in Mladost

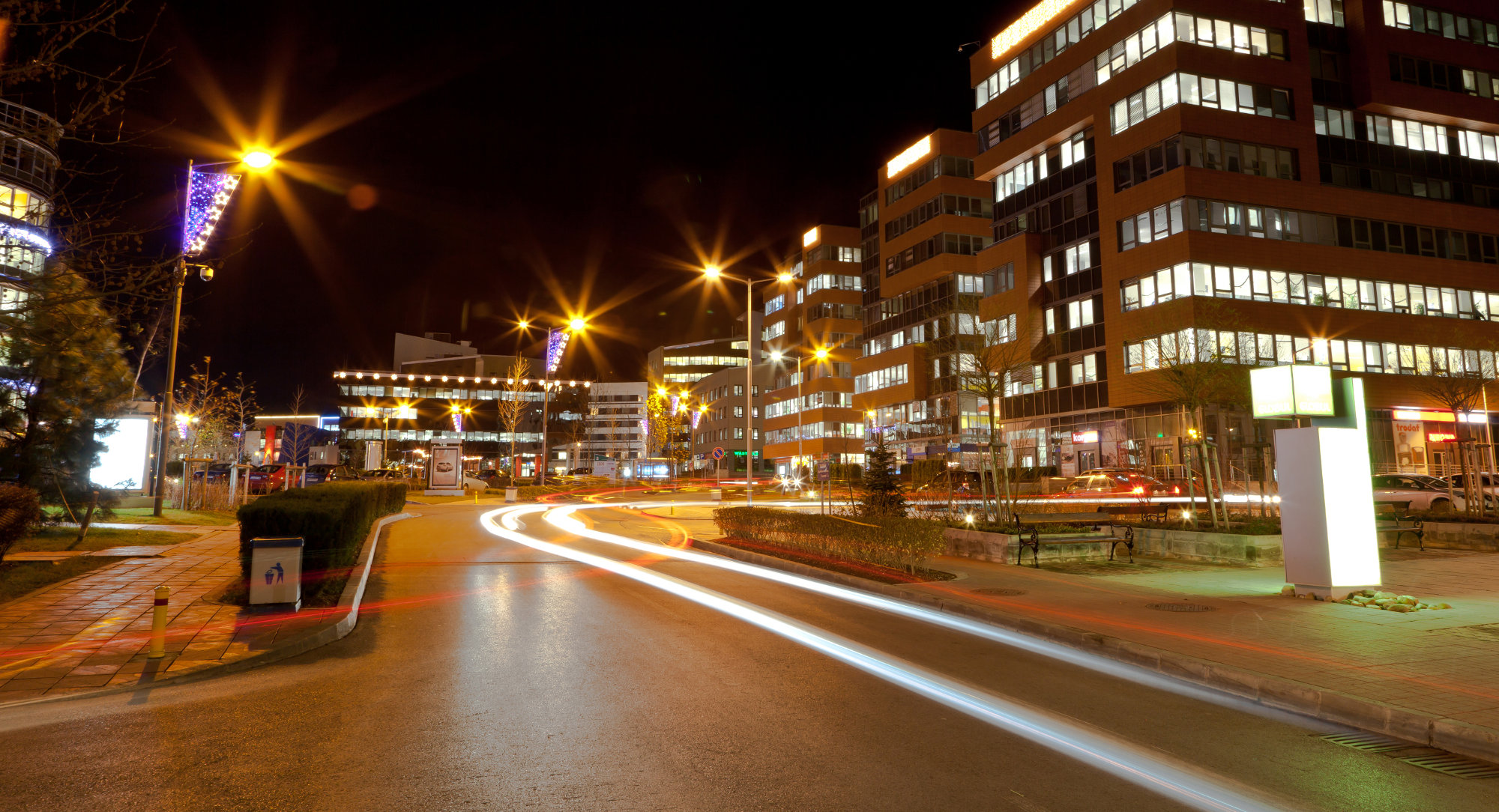
Business Park Sofia

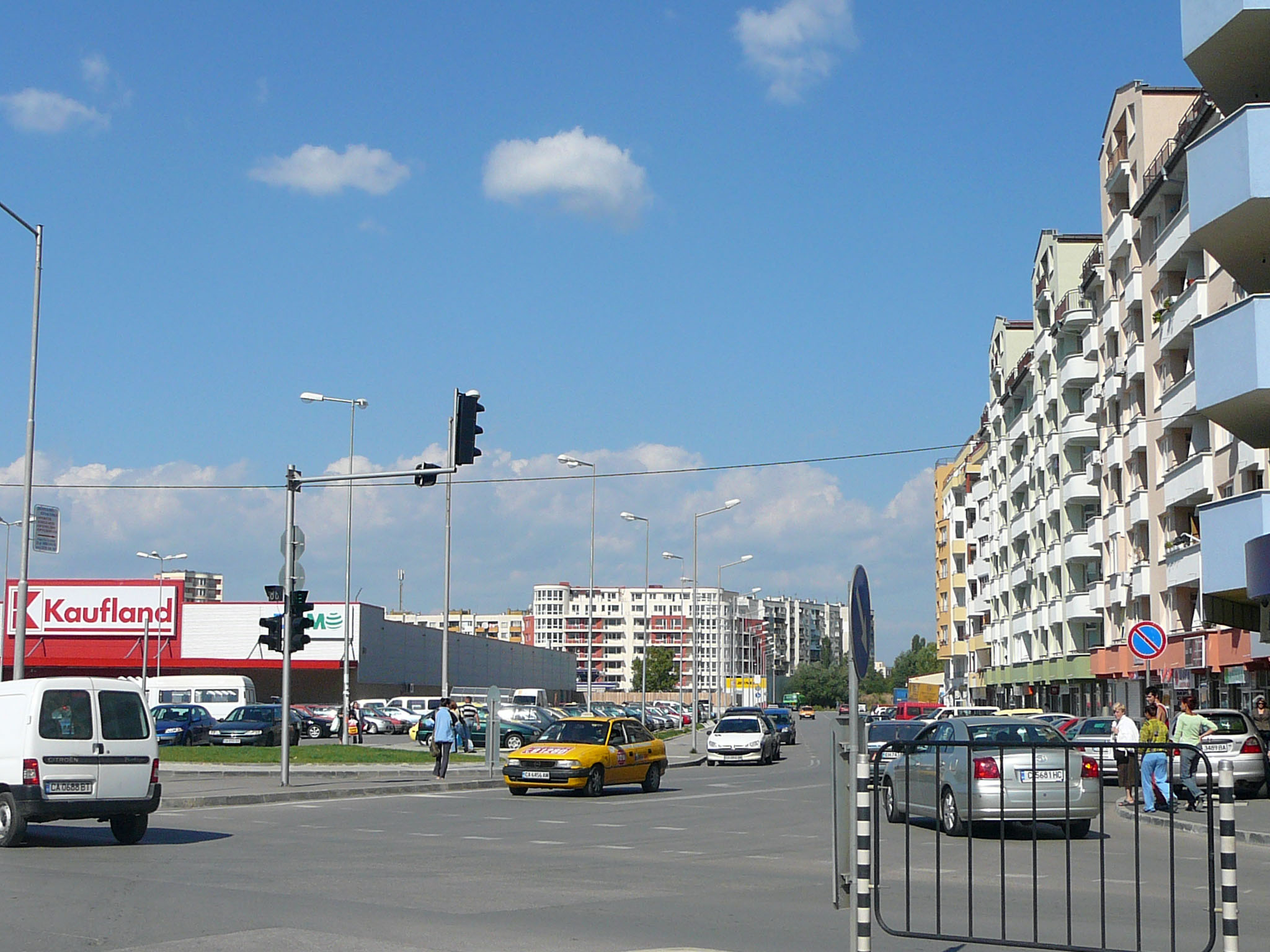
"Kaufland" in Mladost 3

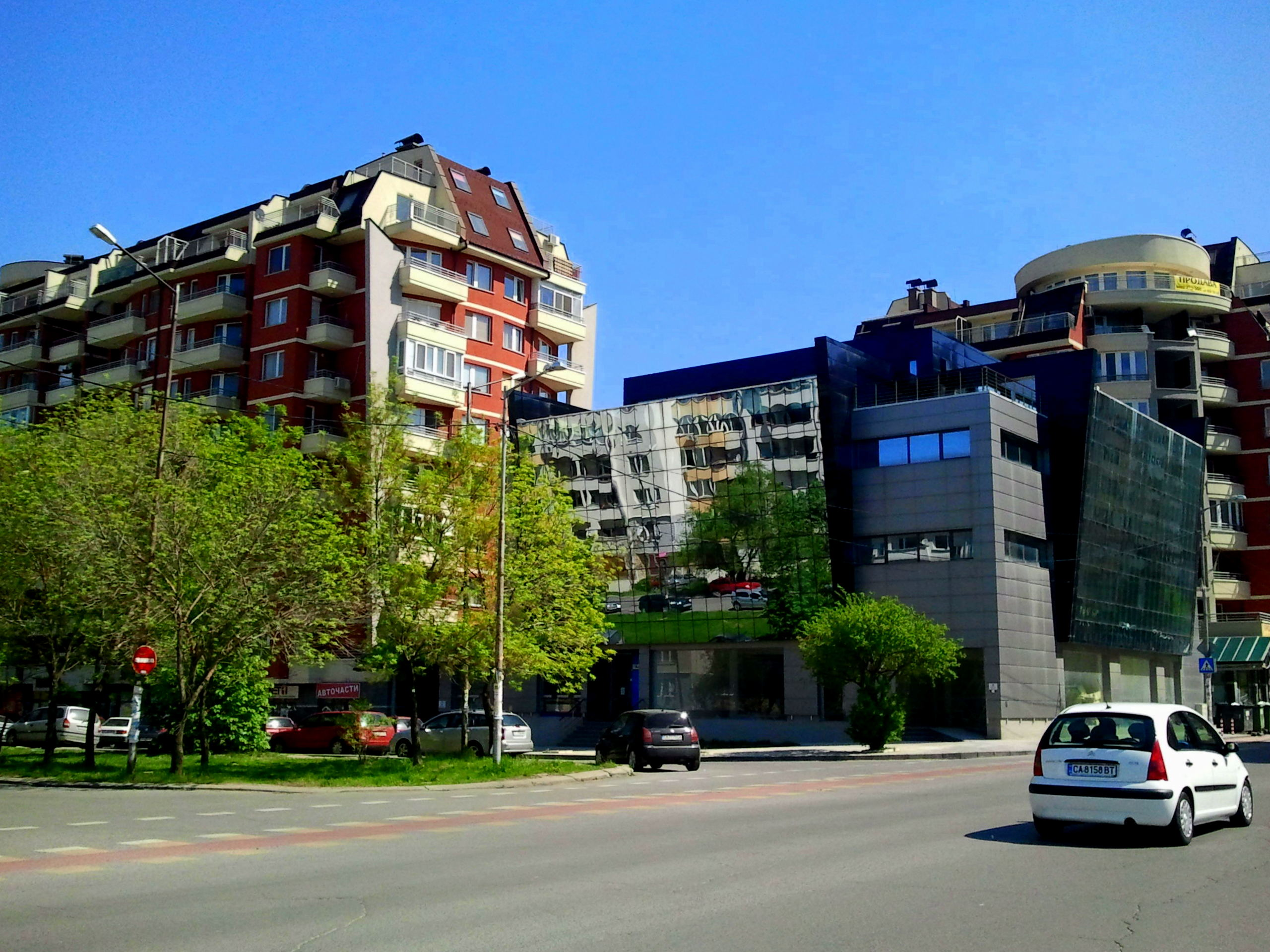
Mladost 4 "Xenia Complex"
