= G. M. Dimitrov Metro Station =

Sofia metro station

G.M.Dimitrov Г.М.Димитров
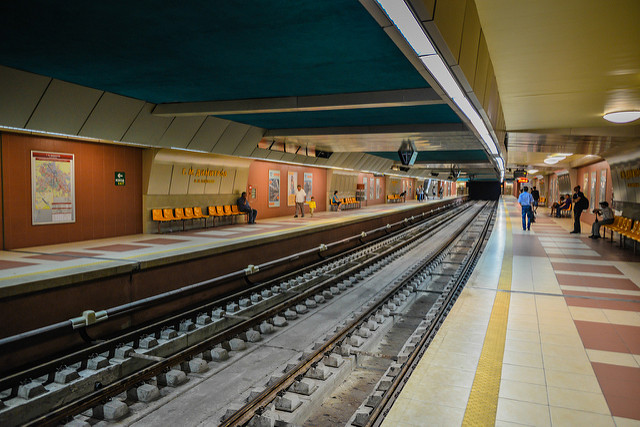

General information
- Location: 1756 Student Complex, Sofia
- Coordinates: 42°39′46″N 23°21′28″E
- Owner: Sofia Municipality
- Operator: Metropoliten JSC
- Platforms: side
- Tracks: 2
- Bus routes: 9
- Connections
- Bus: 67, 69, 70, 88, 123, 280, 288, 294, 413

Construction
- Structure type: ground
- Platform levels: 2
- Parking: no
- Cycle facilities: no
- Accessible: none
- Architect: Krasen Andreev

Other information
- Status: Staffed
- Station code: 3021; 3022
- Website: Official website

History
- Opened: 8 May 2009

Passengers
- 2020: 430,000

Services
Preceding station	Sofia Metro	Following station
Joliot-Curie towards Slivnitsa	M1 line	Musagenitsa towards Business Park Sofia
Joliot-Curie towards Slivnitsa	M4 line	Musagenitsa towards Sofia Airport
Location

G.M.Dimitrov Metro Station (Bulgarian: Метростанция "Г. М. Димитров") is a station on the Sofia Metro in Bulgaria. It opened on 8 May 2009.

== Interchange with other public transport ==
- City Bus service: 88, 280, 288, 294, 413
- Suburban Bus service: 67, 69, 70, 123

== Gallery ==
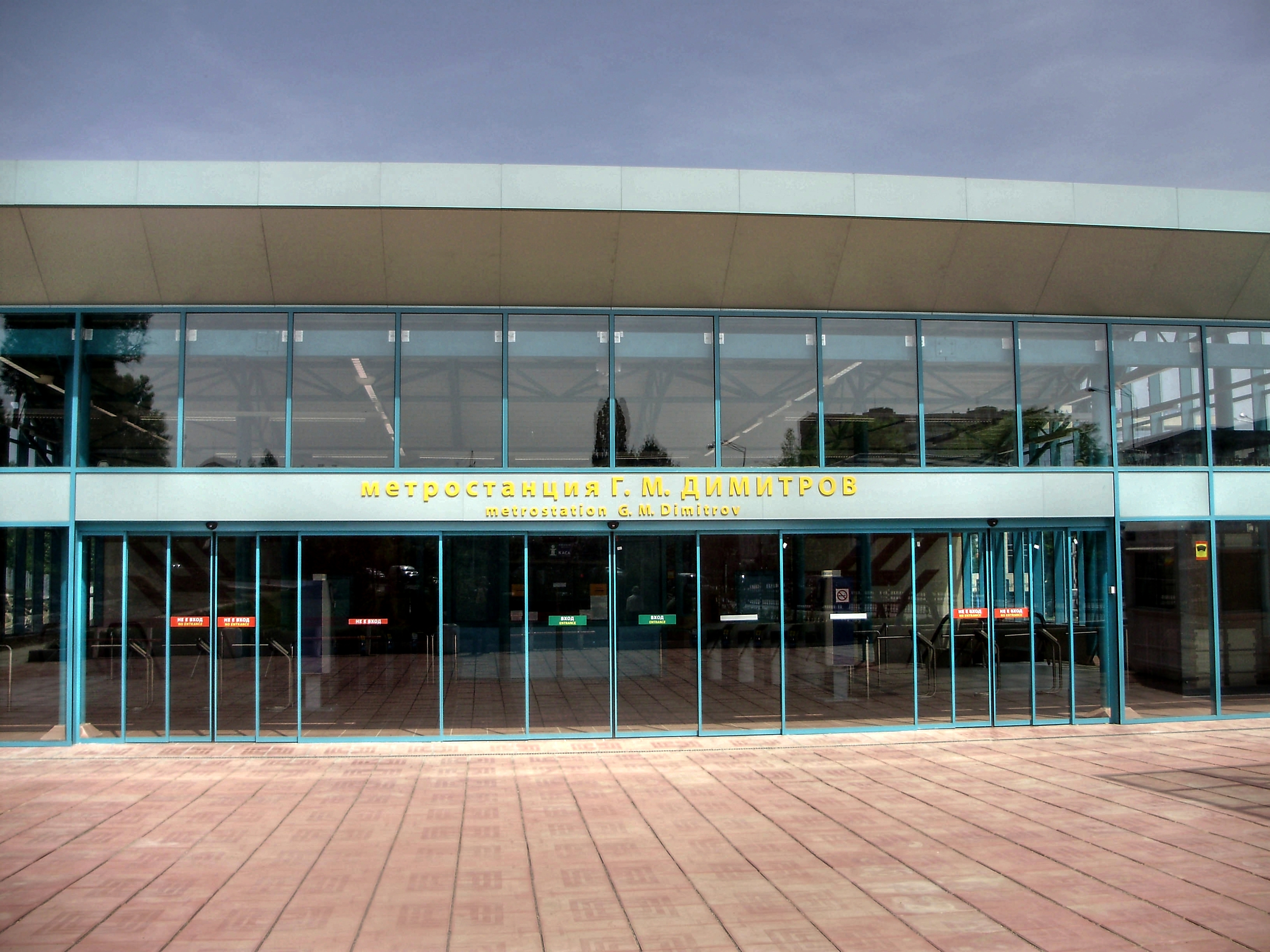
