= Musagenitsa Metro Station =

Sofia metro station

Musagenitsa Мусагеница
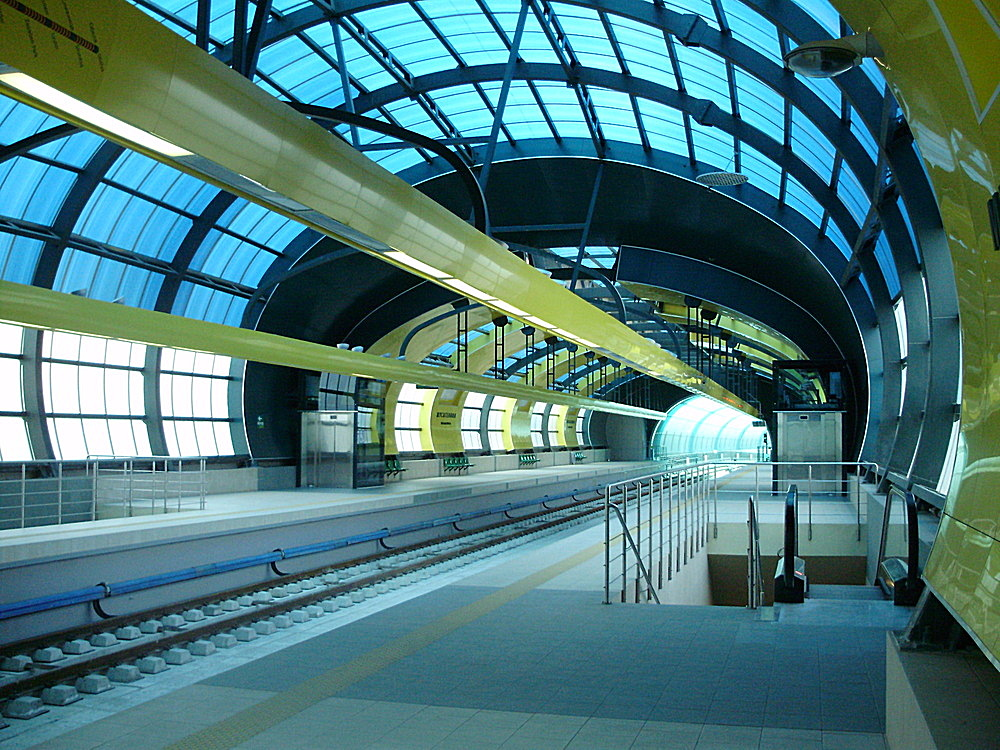

General information
- Location: 1797 Darvenitsa, Sofia
- Coordinates: 42°39′31″N 23°21′52″E
- Owner: Sofia Municipality
- Operator: Metropoliten JSC
- Platforms: side
- Tracks: 2
- Bus routes: none

Construction
- Structure type: overground
- Platform levels: 2
- Parking: no
- Cycle facilities: no
- Accessible: Yes
- Architect: Elena Paktiaval; Farid Paktiawal; Rumyana Kostadinova

Other information
- Status: Staffed
- Station code: 3023; 3024
- Website: Official website

History
- Opened: 8 May 2009

Passengers
- 2020: 280,000

Services
Preceding station	Sofia Metro	Following station
G.M.Dimitrov towards Slivnitsa	M1 line	Mladost 1 towards Business Park Sofia
G.M.Dimitrov towards Slivnitsa	M4 line	Mladost 1 towards Sofia Airport
Location

Musagenitsa Metro Station (Bulgarian: Метростанция „Мусагеница“) is a station on the Sofia Metro in Bulgaria. It opened on 8 May 2009, together with four more metro stations.

== Location ==
Musagenitsa metro station is located in Sofia's "Darvenitsa" neighborhood. It is located on "Prof. Marko Semov" Boulevard, immediately north-west of a 240 m-long (790 ft) bridge over the Vartopo river.

== Public Transportation ==
There are no other public transport lines in the immediate vicinity of the station. The nearest bus/trolley lines stops are near the other 2 closest metro stations - G.M. Dimitrov and Mladost 1 which are to the east and west respectively.

Thus, the nearest public transport link besides the metro station itself, is about 600 meters away in either direction.

== Gallery ==
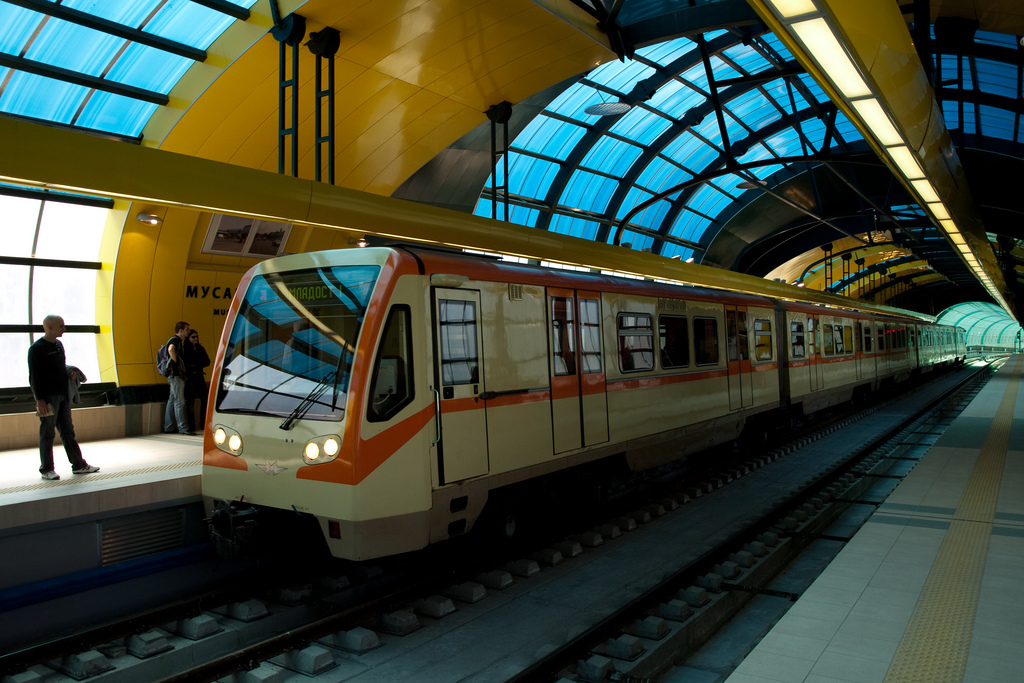

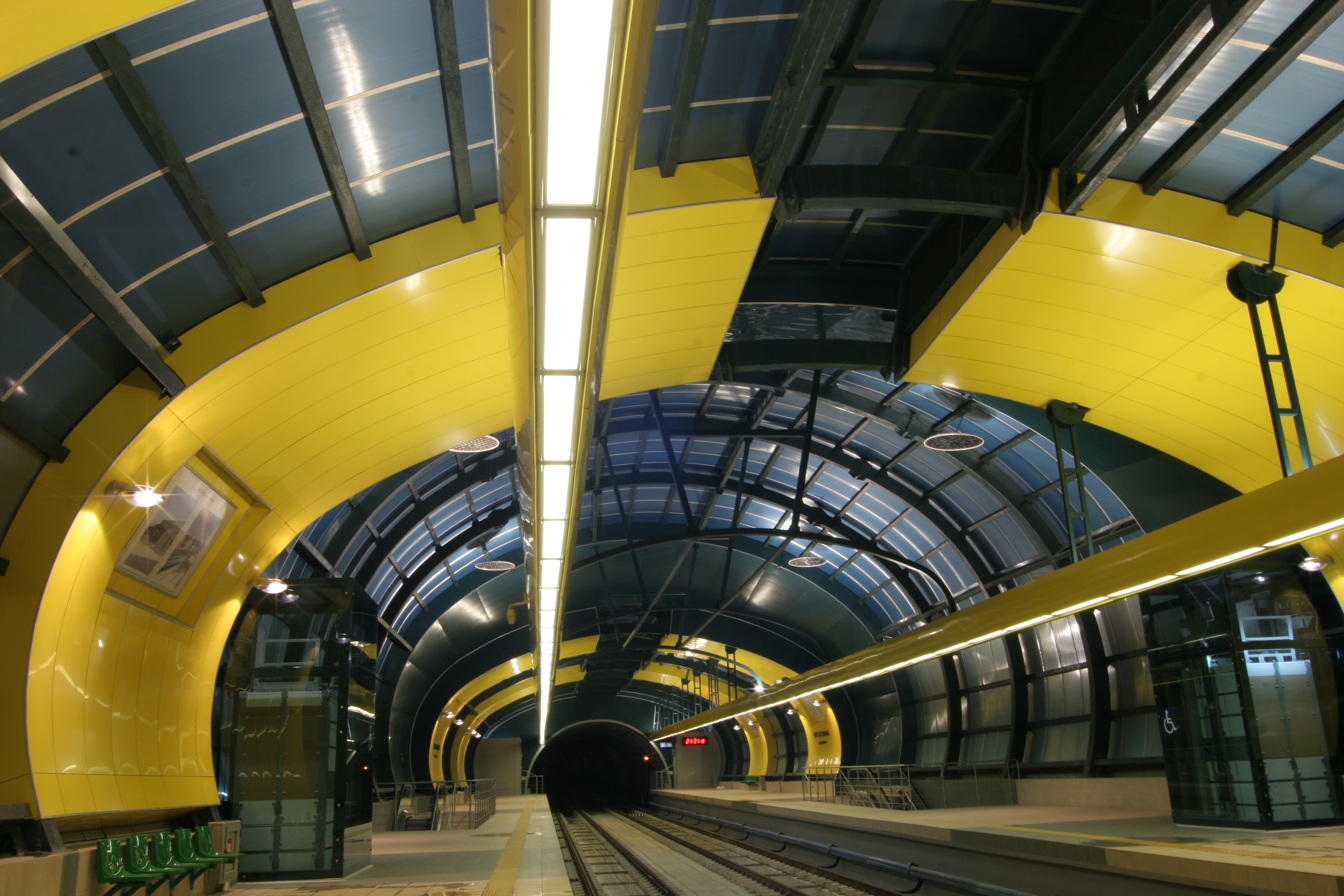

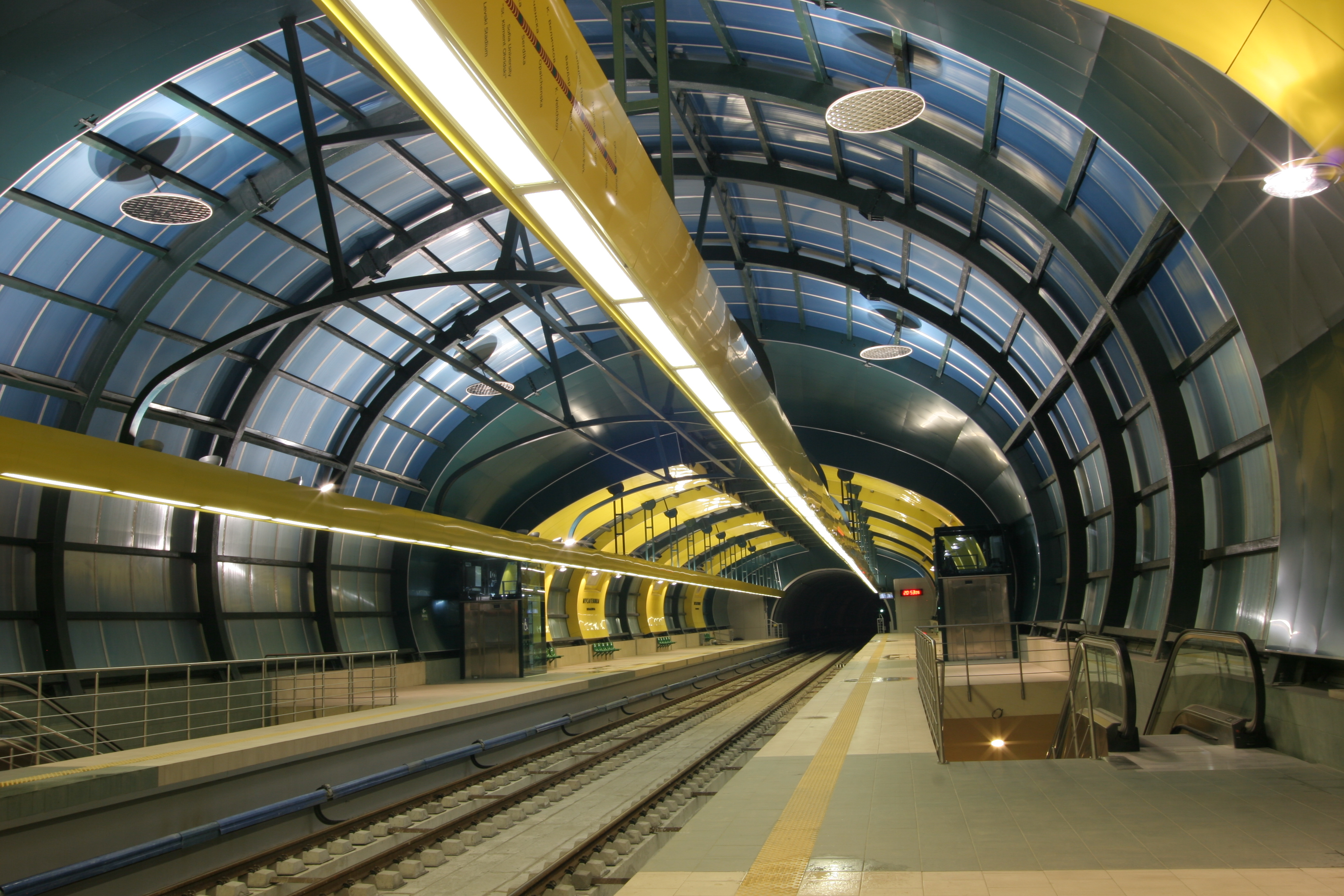

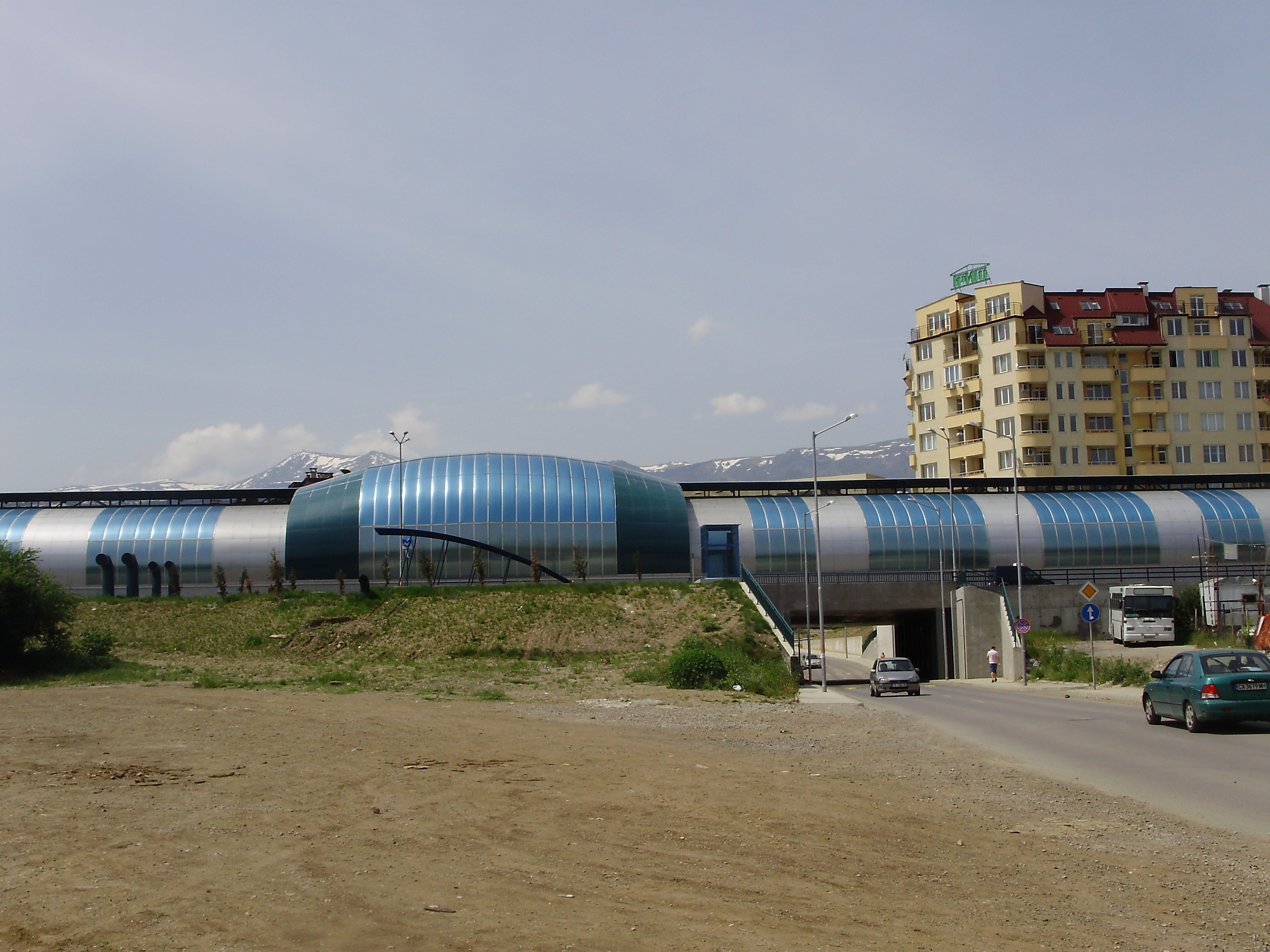

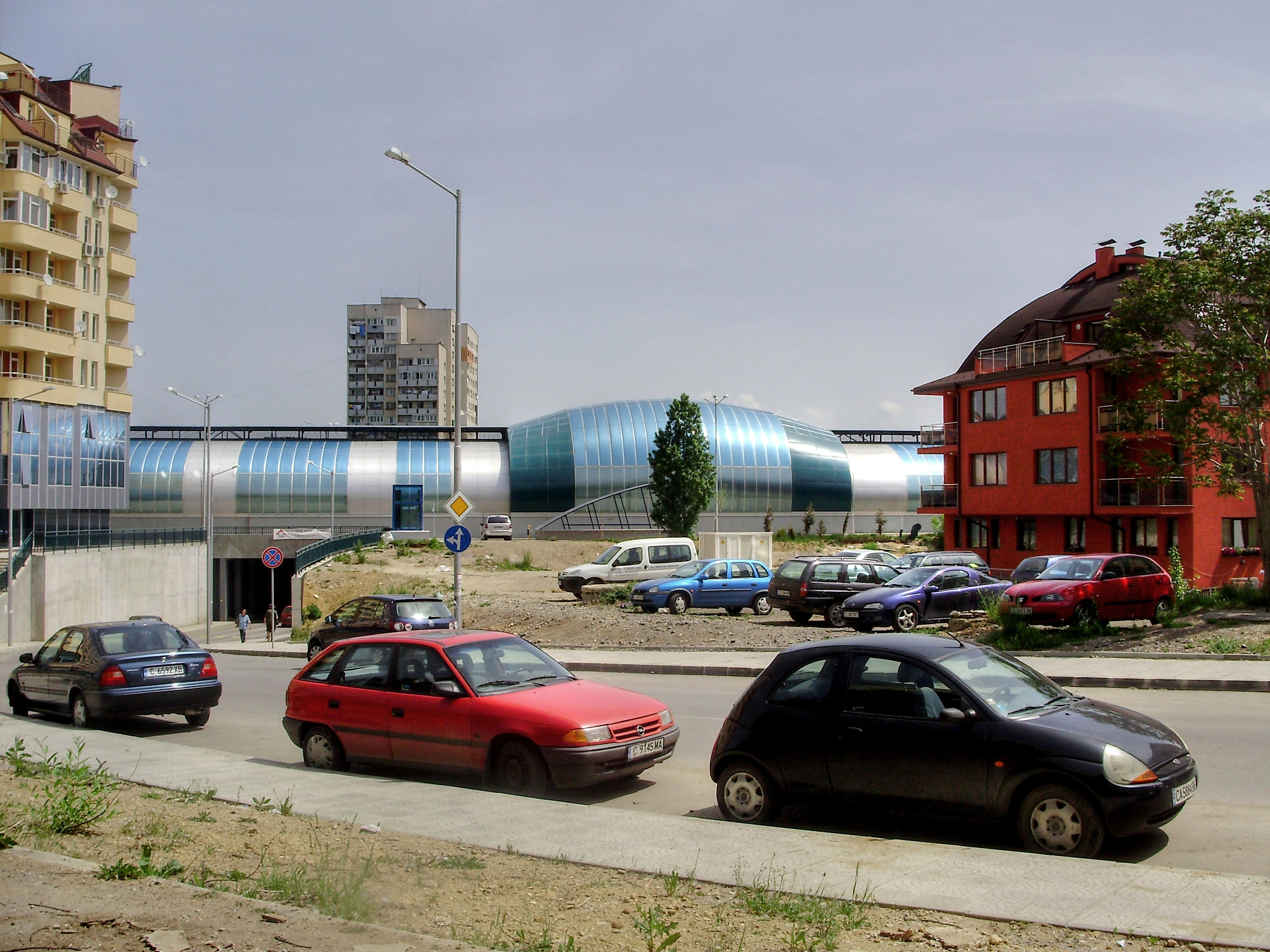
