= Inter Expo Center – Tsarigradsko shose Metro Station =

Sofia metro station

IEC – Tsarigradsko shose ИЕЦ – Цариградско шосе
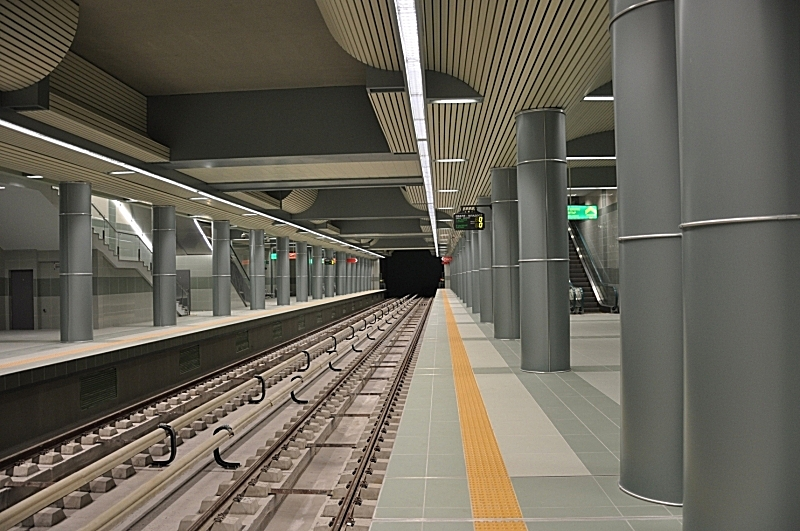

General information
- Location: Tsarigradsko shose, Sofia
- Coordinates: 42°38′58.62″N 23°23′37.01″E
- Owner: Sofia Municipality
- Operator: Metropoliten JSC
- Platforms: side
- Tracks: 2
- Bus routes: 5
- Connections
- Bus: 1, 3, 5, 6, X50

Construction
- Structure type: sub-surface
- Platform levels: 3
- Parking: yes
- Cycle facilities: yes
- Accessible: an elevator to entrance
- Architect: Konstantin Kosev

Other information
- Status: Staffed
- Station code: 3029; 3030
- Website: Official website

History
- Opened: 25 April 2012
- Former names: Tsarigradsko shose

Passengers
- 2020: 170,000

Services
Preceding station	Sofia Metro	Following station
Mladost 3 towards Slivnitsa	M4 line	Druzhba towards Sofia Airport
Location

Inter Expo Center – Tsarigradsko shose Metro Station (Bulgarian: Метростанция "Интер Експо Център - Цариградско шосе") is a station on the Sofia Metro in Bulgaria. It opened on 25 April 2012. Bulgaria's Prime Minister Boyko Borisov and EU Council President Herman Van Rompuy inaugurated the new section of the Sofia Metro, which was funded with EU money. It is located on Tsarigradsko shose.

== Interchange with other public transport ==
- City Bus service: X50
- Suburban Bus service: 1, 3, 5, 6

== Location ==
The metro station is situated immediately next to and named after the Inter Expo Center, whose main entrance is located about 20 m (65 feet) from the pedestrian exit of the station. Located in the proximity is the neighborhood of Sofia Skyscraper Center - a cluster of high-rise buildings, including Capital Fort and Sky Fort.

== Gallery ==
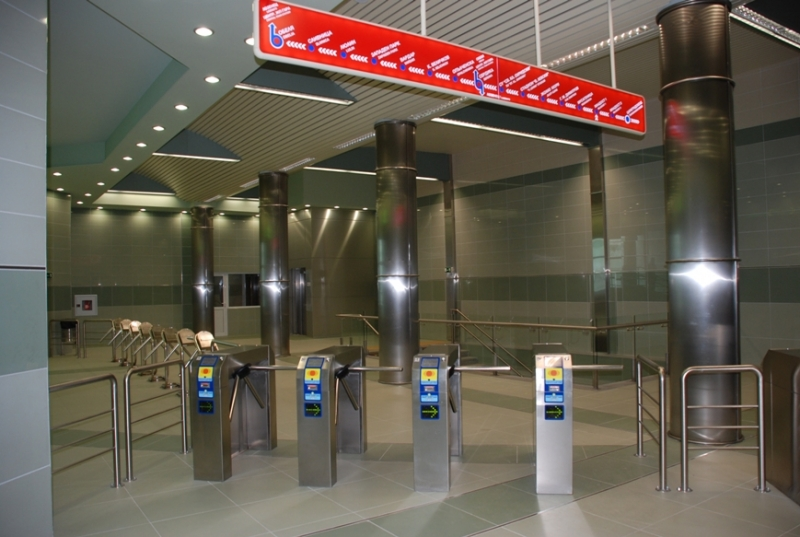
