= Aleksandar Malinov Metro Station =

Sofia metro station

Aleksandar Malinov Александър Малинов
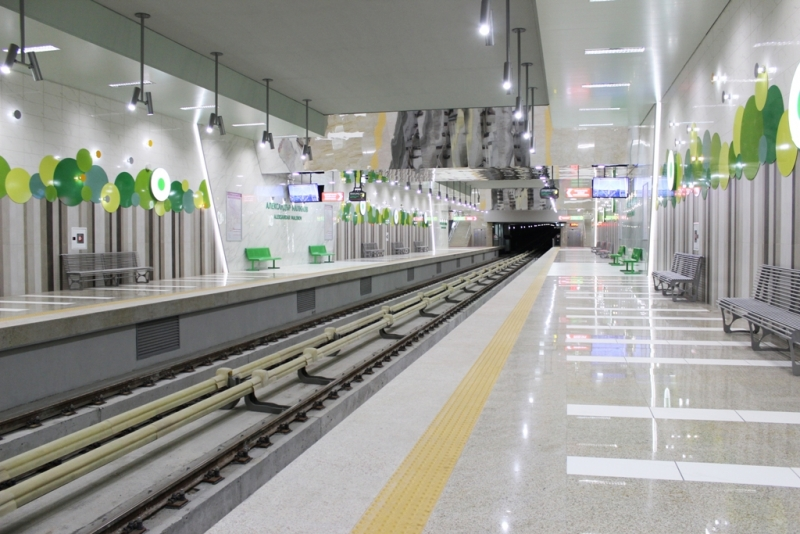

General information
- Location: 1799 Mladost 2, Sofia
- Coordinates: 42°38′50″N 21°22′35″E
- Owner: Sofia Municipality
- Operator: Metropoliten JSC
- Platforms: side
- Tracks: 2
- Bus routes: 8
- Connections
- Bus: 4, 76, 90, 111, 213, 305, 314, N1

Construction
- Structure type: sub-surface
- Platform levels: 2
- Parking: no
- Cycle facilities: yes
- Accessible: an elevator to platforms
- Architect: Irena Derlipanska

Other information
- Status: Staffed
- Station code: 3039; 3040
- Website: Official website

History
- Opened: 8 May 2012

Passengers
- 2020: 300,000

Services
Preceding station	Sofia Metro	Following station
Mladost 1 towards Slivnitsa	M1 line	Akademik Aleksandar Teodorov - Balan towards Business Park Sofia
Location

Aleksandar Malinov Metro Station (Bulgarian: Метростанция "Александър Малинов") is a station on the Sofia Metro in Bulgaria. It started operation on 8 May 2015. It is serviced by the M1 line that runs toward Business Park Sofia station. The station bears the name of 17th Prime Minister of Bulgaria Aleksandar Malinov.

== Interchange with other public transport ==
- City Bus service: 4, 79, 88, 111, 210, 305, 314
- Night Bus service: N1

== Location ==
The station is located in the Mladost neighborhood, underneath Al. Malinov boulevard. It features two concourses, with entrances on either side of the boulevard near where it intersects Andrey Lyapchev boulevard and Sveti Kiprian and Filip Avramov streets. The interior of the station features artwork of a stylized forest landscape.
