= Inter Expo Center =

Bulgarian software developer

Coordinates: 42.649219°N 23.395392°E

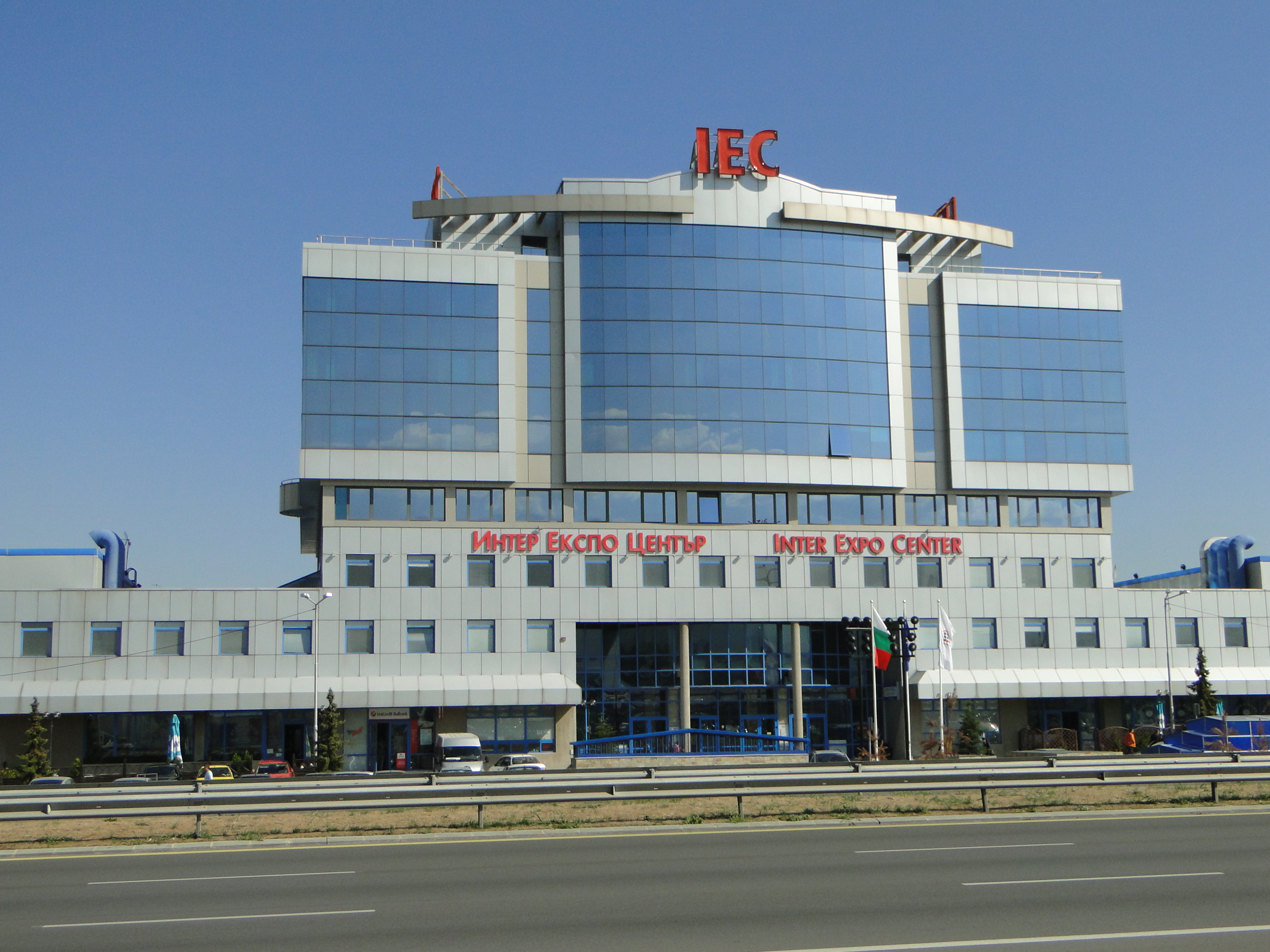
- Front entrance of the Inter Expo Center in 2012
- Interactive map of Inter Expo Center
- Address: Boulevard "Tsarigradsko shose" 147
- Location: Sofia, Bulgaria
- Owner: Bulgarreklama Ltd
- Public transit: 4 via Inter Expo Center – Tsarigradsko shose Metro Station

Construction
- Opened: 2001
- Renovated: 2019
- Expanded: 2003, 2009

Website
- en.iec.bg

The Inter Expo Center (IEC) is a multi-purpose convention center in Sofia, Bulgaria. It consists of six exhibition halls, eight congress halls, and outdoor exhibition spaces. The center is the biggest convention and exhibition venue in the city. The development also includes an office tower above the main reception area and restaurants around the main entrance.

== History ==
The Inter Expo Center opened in 2001, initially featuring two exhibition halls and outdoor exhibition spaces alongside leasable office and trade spaces in an office tower above the halls and in public areas around the main entrance facing the street.

The center had its first expansion in 2003, adding a congress center featuring eight congress halls, as well as an additional exhibition hall. In 2008, the center was expanded again with the opening of further exhibition halls. The Inter Expo Center – Tsarigradsko shose Metro Station, part of the Sofia Metro, opened in April 2012. Originally named the Tsarigradsko shose Metro Station, it was renamed to bear the convention center's name less than two months later.

The congress halls were renovated in 2019, which was considered the biggest update to the center since its last expansion.
