= Druzhba Metro Station =

Sofia metro station

Druzhba Дружба
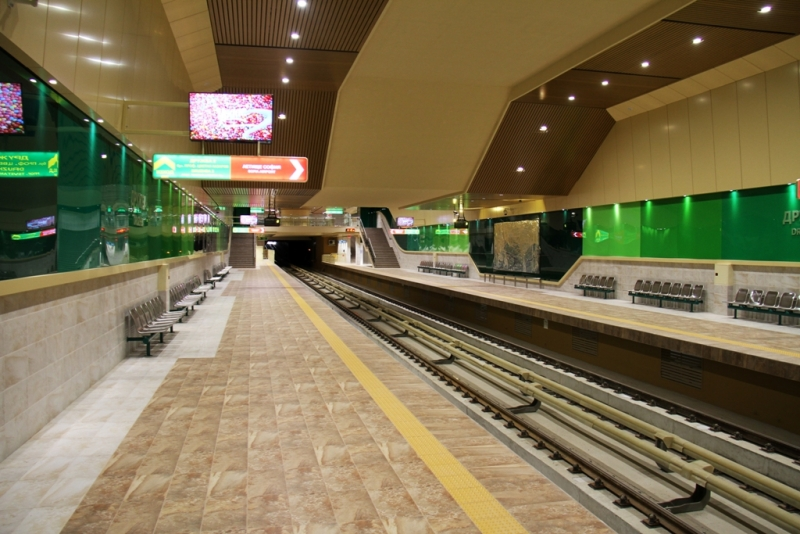

General information
- Location: 1592 Druzhba, Sofia
- Coordinates: 42°39′30″N 23°23′40″E
- Owner: Sofia Municipality
- Operator: Metropoliten JSC
- Platforms: side
- Tracks: 2
- Bus routes: 4
- Connections
- Trolleybus: 4, 11
- Bus: 204, 304, 404, 604

Construction
- Structure type: sub-surface
- Platform levels: 2
- Parking: no
- Cycle facilities: yes
- Accessible: an elevator to platforms
- Architect: Krasen Andreev

Other information
- Status: Staffed
- Station code: 3031; 3032
- Website: Official website

History
- Opened: 2 April 2015

Services
Preceding station	Sofia Metro	Following station
Tsarigradsko shose towards Slivnitsa	M4 line	Iskarsko shose towards Sofia Airport
Location

Druzhba Metro Station (Bulgarian: Метростанция "Дружба") is a station on the Sofia Metro in Bulgaria. It opened on 2 April 2015.

== Interchange with other public transport ==
- City Bus service: 204, 304, 404, 604
- Trolleybus service: 4, 11

== Location ==
The station is located between Captain Dimitar Spisarevski Street and Professor Tsvetan Lazarov Boulevard in the Druzhba 1 and 2 neighbourhoods of the Iskar district.
