= Mladost 1 Metro Station =

Sofia metro station

Mladost 1 Младост 1
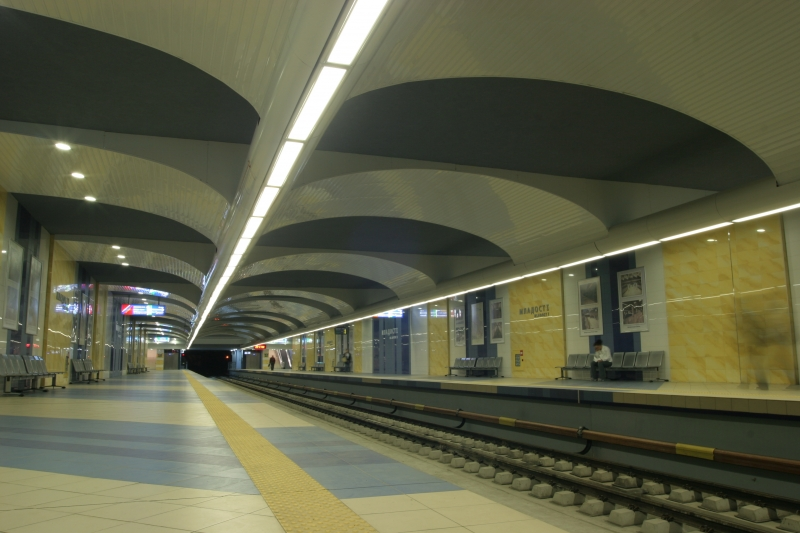

General information
- Location: 1784 Mladost 1, Sofia
- Coordinates: 42°39′14″N 23°22′19″E
- Owner: Sofia Municipality
- Operator: Metropoliten JSC
- Platforms: side
- Tracks: 2
- Bus routes: 3
- Connections
- Trolleybus: 5
- Bus: 4, 111, 314

Construction
- Structure type: sub-surface
- Platform levels: 2
- Parking: no
- Cycle facilities: no
- Accessible: an elevator to platforms
- Architect: Elena and Farid Paktiawal

Other information
- Status: Staffed
- Station code: 3025; 3026
- Website: Official website

History
- Opened: 8 May 2009

Passengers
- 2020: 620,000

Services
Preceding station	Sofia Metro	Following station
Musagenitsa towards Slivnitsa	M1 line	Aleksandar Malinov towards Business Park Sofia
Musagenitsa towards Slivnitsa	M4 line	Mladost 3 towards Sofia Airport
Location

Mladost 1 Metro Station (Bulgarian: Метростанция "Младост 1") is a station on the Sofia Metro in Bulgaria. It opened on 8 May 2009. The station is served by M1 and M4 lines. M1 line continues towards Business Park, while M4 continues to Sofia Airport.

== Public transport interchange ==
- Trolleybus service: 5
- City Bus service: 111, 314
- Suburban Bus service: 4

== Location ==
The station is located between the intersection of Andrei Sakharov Blvd. with Jerusalem St. in the residential area Mladost 1 and the market on both sides of the boulevard in the direction of Alexander Malinov. The metrostation is underground, with side platforms, shallow setting. The length of the platform is 105 metres (344 ft) above the section. The station is done in blue tones with pale yellow walls and floor, above the platforms are transverse vaulted segments of a suspended ceiling type "Hunter Douglas", which reflect light. The station has two underground vestibules, which are connected to the subways at the crossroads.

After this station, the track branches off in the direction of the airport (Line M4) and in the direction of zh.k. Mladost 4, near the Business Park (Line M1).

== Gallery ==
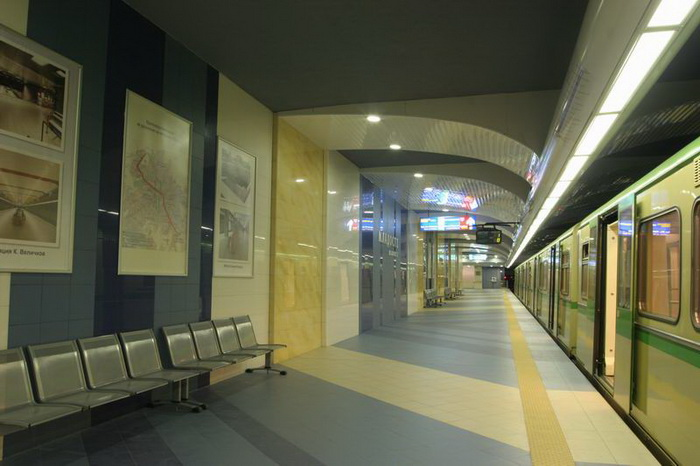

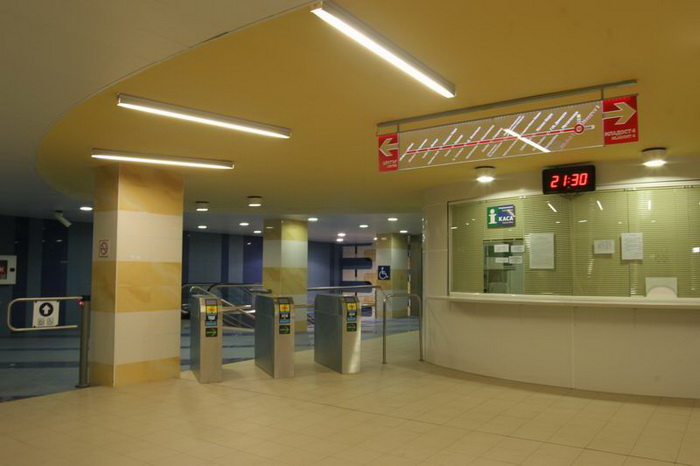

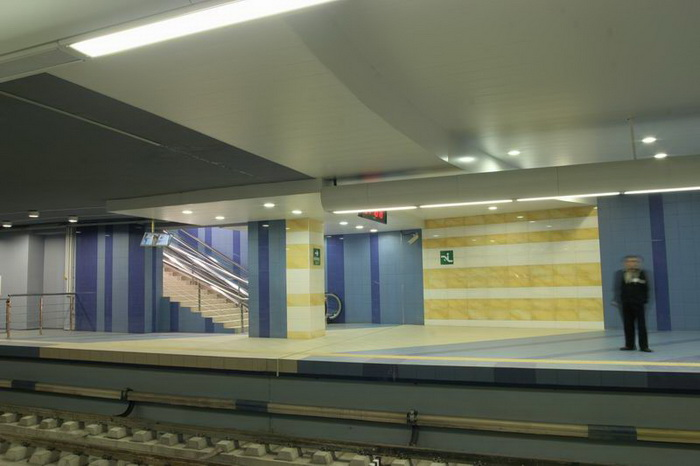

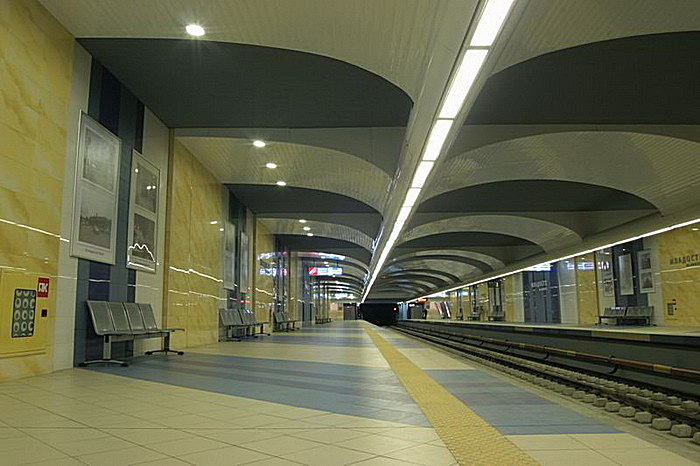
