= European Union Metro Station =

Sofia metro station

European Union Европейски съюз
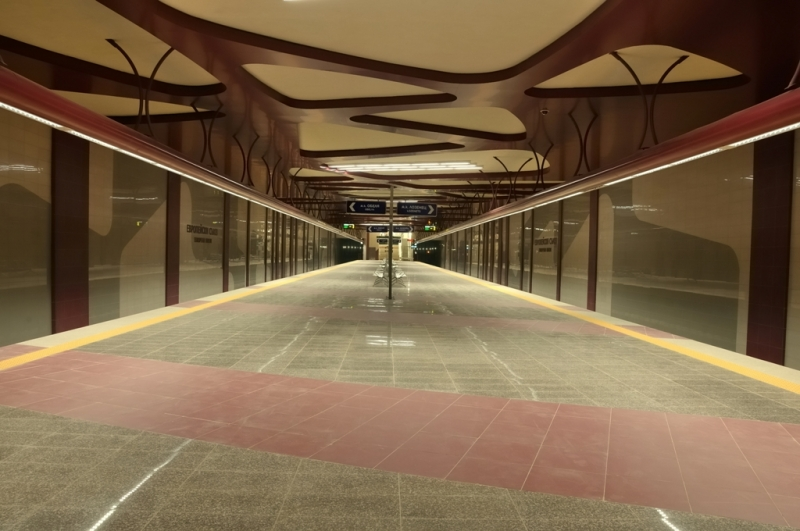

General information
- Location: 1421 Lozenets, Sofia
- Coordinates: 42°40′46.43″N 23°19′17.56″E
- Owner: Sofia Municipality
- Operator: Metropoliten JSC
- Platforms: island
- Tracks: 2
- Bus routes: 4
- Connections
- Trolleybus: 7
- Bus: 94, 102, X9, N2

Construction
- Structure type: sub-surface
- Platform levels: 2
- Parking: no
- Cycle facilities: yes
- Accessible: yes
- Architect: Elena and Farid Paktiawal

Other information
- Status: Staffed
- Station code: 2979; 2980
- Website: Official website

History
- Opened: 31 August 2012

Passengers
- 2020: 170,000

Services
Preceding station	Sofia Metro	Following station
James Bourchier towards Vitosha	M2 line	NDK towards Obelya
Location

European Union Metro Station (Bulgarian: Метростанция „Европейски съюз“; Metrostantsiya „Evropeyski sayuz“) is a station on the Sofia Metro in Bulgaria.

It opened on 31 August 2012. Bulgaria's PM Boyko Borisov and the President of the European Commission Jose Manuel Barroso inaugurated the new section of the Sofia Metro, which was funded with EU money. Barroso expressed his delight that the metro station was named after the European Union.

== History ==
As the Sofia underground network was planned in the late 1970s, the station, along with the NDK Metro Station, was originally built in the early 1980s, along with the building of the National Palace of Culture. The original project name of the station was "Hemus" (the name of the large hotel next to the station); during the building of Line 2 of the Sofia Metro, it was planned to be called "Sveti Naum" (as it is located at the intersection of the Cherni Vrah and Sv. Naum boulevards). Shortly before the opening of the station, the city council (dominated by the Citizens for European Development of Bulgaria party) controversially voted to change the name to "European Union". As the timing was so close to the opening of Line 2, many of the maps in the trains still retained the name "St. Naum" even after station was opened to the public.

== Interchange with other public transport ==
- City Bus service: 94, 102, X9
- Trolleybus service: 7

== Location ==
The European Union Metro Station is situated nearby the Earth and Man National Museum and City Center Sofia.

== Gallery ==
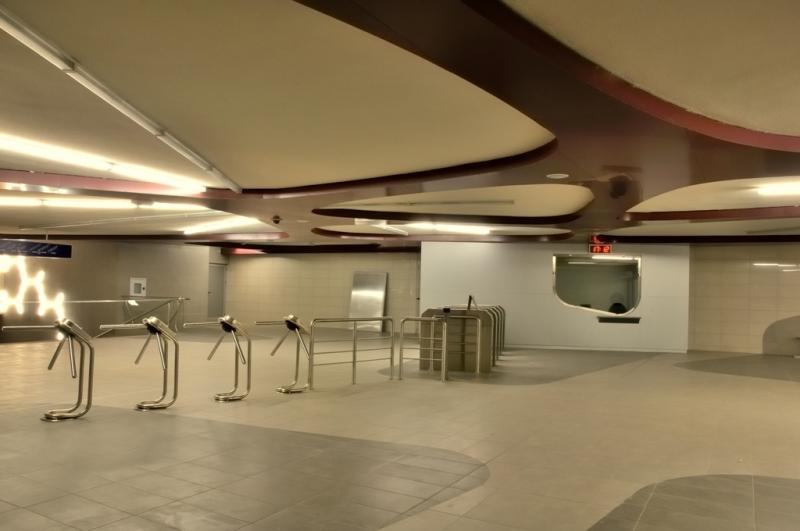

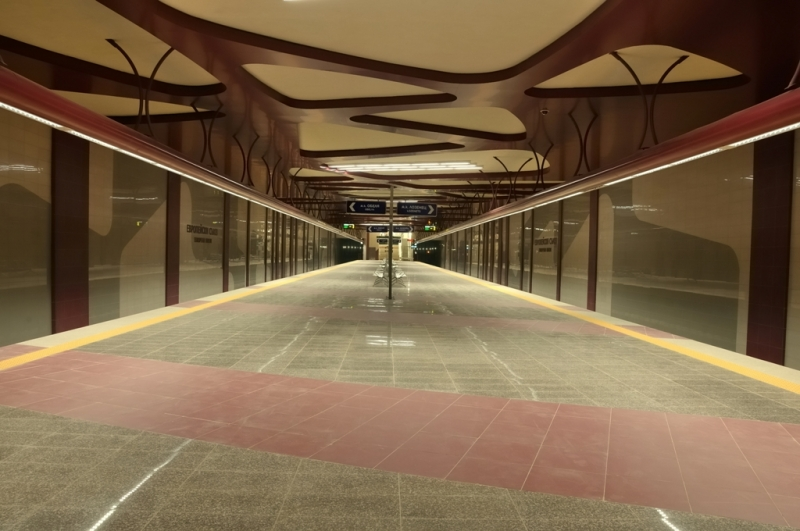
