= Mladost 3 Metro Station =

Sofia metro station

Mladost 3 Младост 3
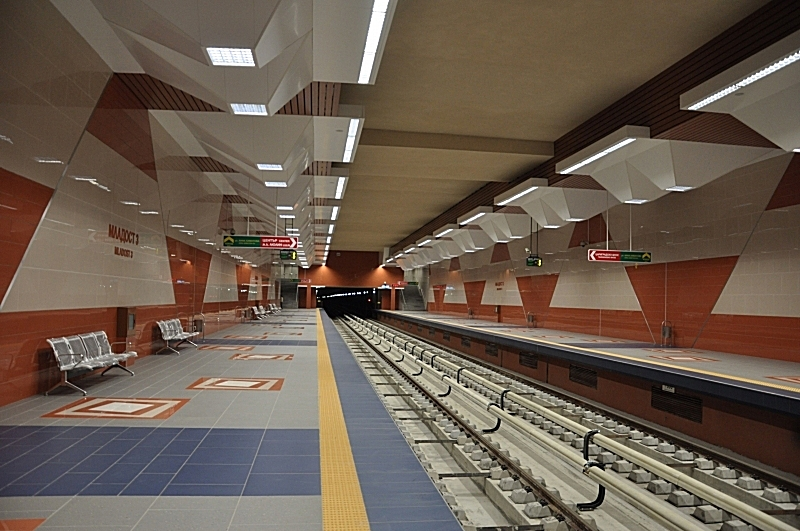

General information
- Location: 1729 Mladost 1A, Sofia
- Coordinates: 42°38′47.51″N 23°23′1.44″E
- Owner: Sofia Municipality
- Operator: Metropoliten JSC
- Platforms: side
- Tracks: 2
- Bus routes: none

Construction
- Structure type: sub-surface
- Platform levels: 2
- Parking: no
- Cycle facilities: no
- Accessible: an elevator to platforms
- Architect: Arsis Studio

Other information
- Status: Staffed
- Station code: 3027; 3028
- Website: Official website

History
- Opened: 25 April 2012

Passengers
- 2020: 380,000

Services
Preceding station	Sofia Metro	Following station
Mladost 1 towards Slivnitsa	M4 line	Inter Expo Center - Tsarigradsko shose towards Sofia Airport
Location

Mladost 3 Metro Station (Bulgarian: Метростанция "Младост 3") is a station on the Sofia Metro in Bulgaria. It opened on 25 April 2012. Bulgaria's PM Boyko Borisov and EU Council President Herman Van Rompuy inaugurated the new section of the Sofia Metro, which was funded with EU money.

== Interchange with other public transport ==
None at the moment. Tramway service on line 23 is expected to open in the future. City Bus service on line 510 is expected to open in the future.

== Gallery ==
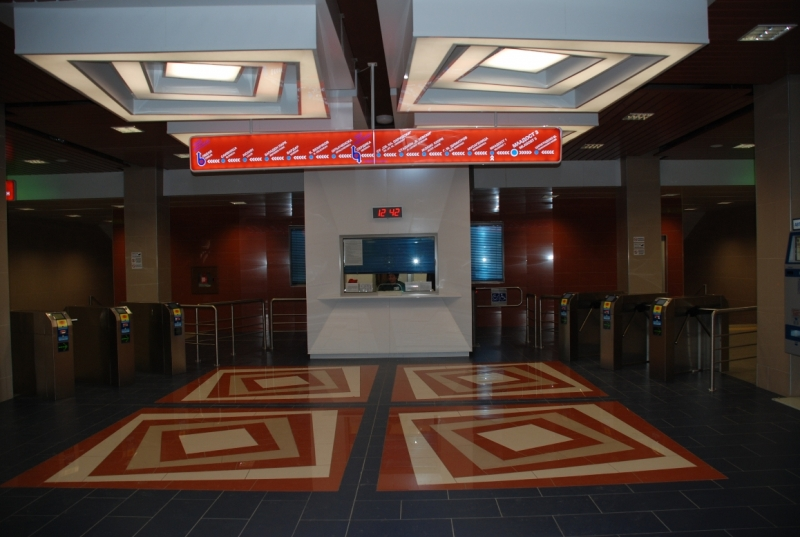
