= Akademik Aleksandar Teodorov - Balan Metro Station =

Sofia metro station

Aleksandar Teodorov – Balan Александър Теодоров – Балан
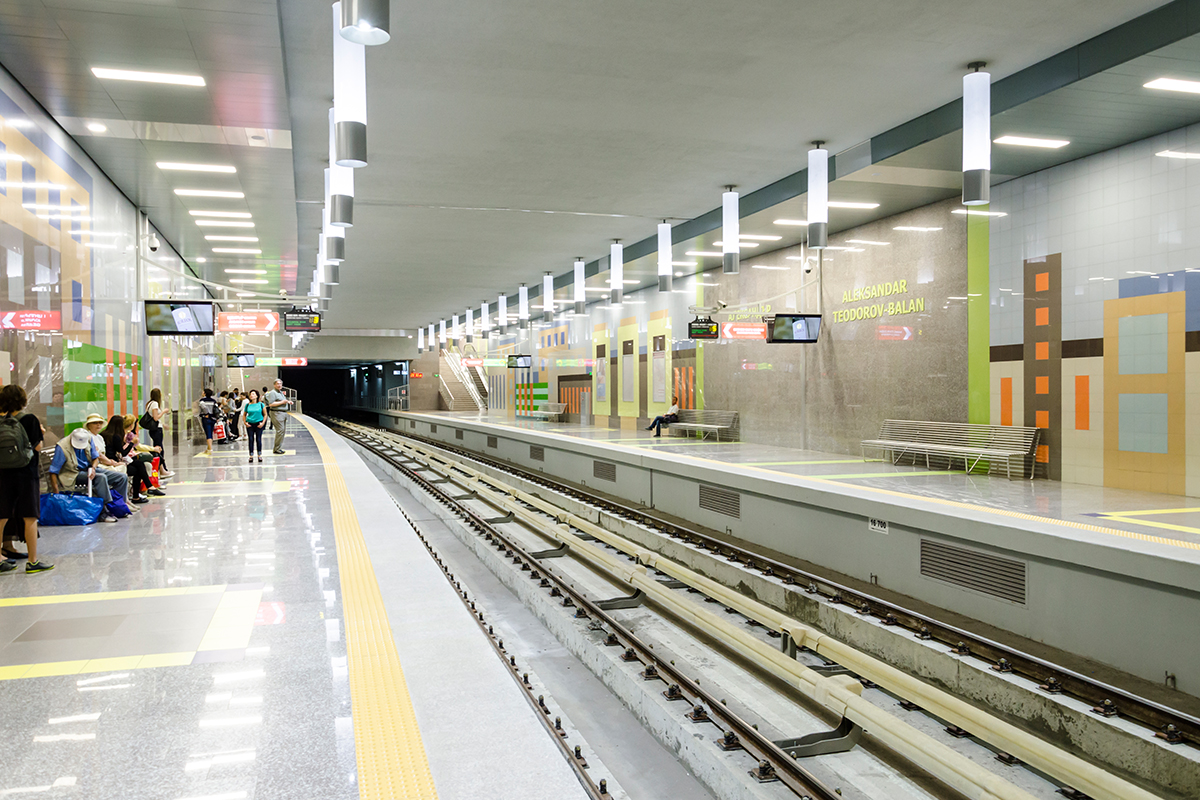

General information
- Location: 1712 Mladost 3, Sofia
- Coordinates: 42°38′25″N 23°22′22″E
- Owner: Sofia Municipality
- Operator: Metropoliten JSC
- Platforms: side
- Tracks: 2
- Bus routes: 8
- Connections
- Bus: 4, 76, 111, 305, 413, X9, X10, N1

Construction
- Structure type: sub-surface
- Platform levels: 2
- Parking: no
- Cycle facilities: yes
- Accessible: an elevator to platforms
- Architect: Irene Derlipanska

Other information
- Status: Staffed
- Station code: 3041; 3042
- Website: Official website

History
- Opened: 8 May 2015

Passengers
- 2020: 270,000

Services
Preceding station	Sofia Metro	Following station
Aleksandar Malinov towards Slivnitsa	M1 line	Business Park Sofia Terminus
Location

Akademik Aleksandar Teodorov - Balan Metro Station (Bulgarian: Метростанция "Академик Александър Теодоров - Балан") is a station on the Sofia Metro in Bulgaria. It started operation on 8 May 2015.

== Interchange with other public transport ==
- Bus service: 4, 76, X9, X10, 111, 305, 413
- Night Bus service: N1
