= James Bourchier Metro Station =

Sofia metro station

James Bourchier Джеймс Баучер
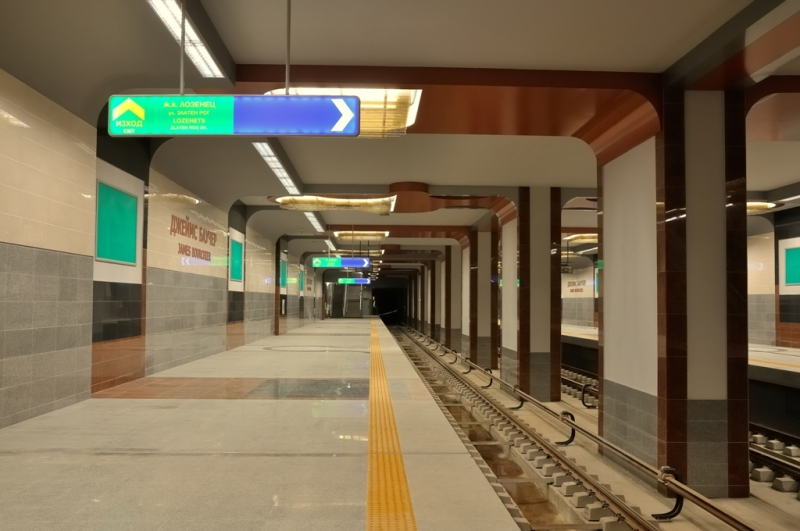

General information
- Location: 1407 Lozenets, Sofia
- Coordinates: 42°40′12.50″N 23°19′12.50″E
- Owner: Sofia Municipality
- Operator: Metropoliten JSC
- Platforms: side
- Tracks: 2
- Bus routes: 1
- Connections
- Tram: 10, 15
- Bus: X9

Construction
- Structure type: sub-surface
- Depth: 28 m (92 ft)
- Platform levels: 4 and 5
- Parking: yes (650 parking lots)
- Cycle facilities: yes
- Accessible: yes
- Architect: Konstantin Kosev

Other information
- Status: Staffed
- Station code: 2977; 2978
- Website: Official website

History
- Opened: 31 August 2012

Passengers
- 2020: 275,000

Services
Preceding station	Sofia Metro	Following station
Vitosha Terminus	M2 line	European Union towards Obelya
Location

James Bourchier Metro Station (Bulgarian: Метростанция "Джеймс Баучер") is a station on the Sofia Metro in Bulgaria, named after James David Bourchier. It opened on 31 August 2012. Bulgaria's PM Boyko Borisov and the President of the European Commission José Manuel Barroso inaugurated the new section of the Sofia Metro, which was funded with EU money. The initial project name of the Metro Station was Lozenets named after the neighbourhood Lozenets.

A park-and-ride underground facility with 650 parking lots was built along with the construction of the James Bourchier Station.

== Interchange with other public transport ==
- Tramway service: 10
- Bus service: 109

== Location ==
The station is located on Cherni Vrah Blvd., between its intersections with Zlatni Rog St. and Elin Vrah St., with an entrance from James Bourchier Blvd.

== Gallery ==
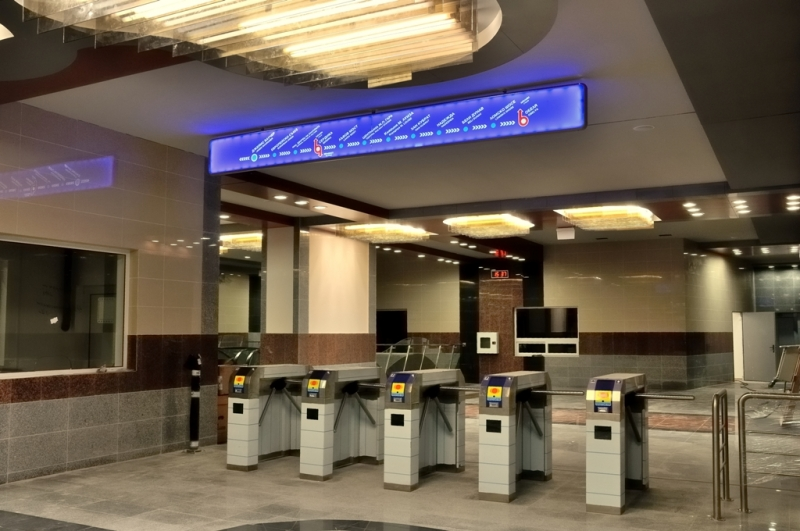
