= Sofia Metro =

Rapid transit system in Bulgaria

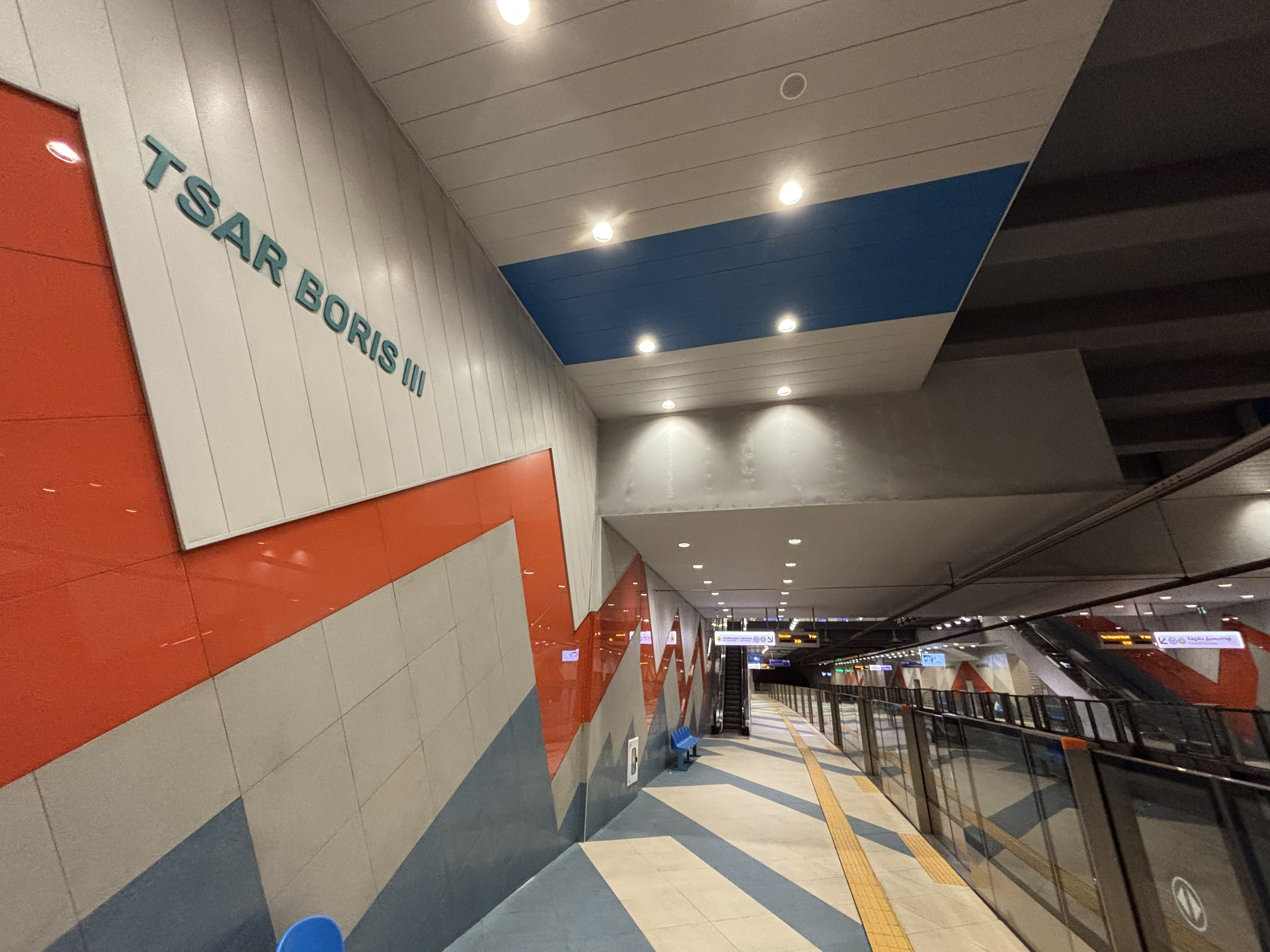
- Tsar Boris III Metro Station, 14 August 2026

Overview
- Native name: Софийско метро
- Owner: City of Sofia
- Locale: Sofia, Bulgaria
- Transit type: Rapid transit
- Number of lines: 4
- Number of stations: 50; 7 under construction
- Daily ridership: 516 000
- Annual ridership: 123 million (2024)
- Chief executive: Nikolai Naidenov
- Website: www.metropolitan.bg

Operation
- Began operation: 28 January 1998; 28 years ago
- Operator: Metropoliten JSC
- Number of vehicles: 272

Technical
- System length: 55.0 km (34.2 mi)
- Track gauge: 1,435 mm (4 ft 8 1/2 in) standard gauge
- Electrification: 825 V DC from third rail (M1/M2/M4 lines); 1,500 V DC from overhead catenary (M3 line)
- Average speed: 39 km/h (24 mph)
- Top speed: 90 km/h (56 mph)
System map
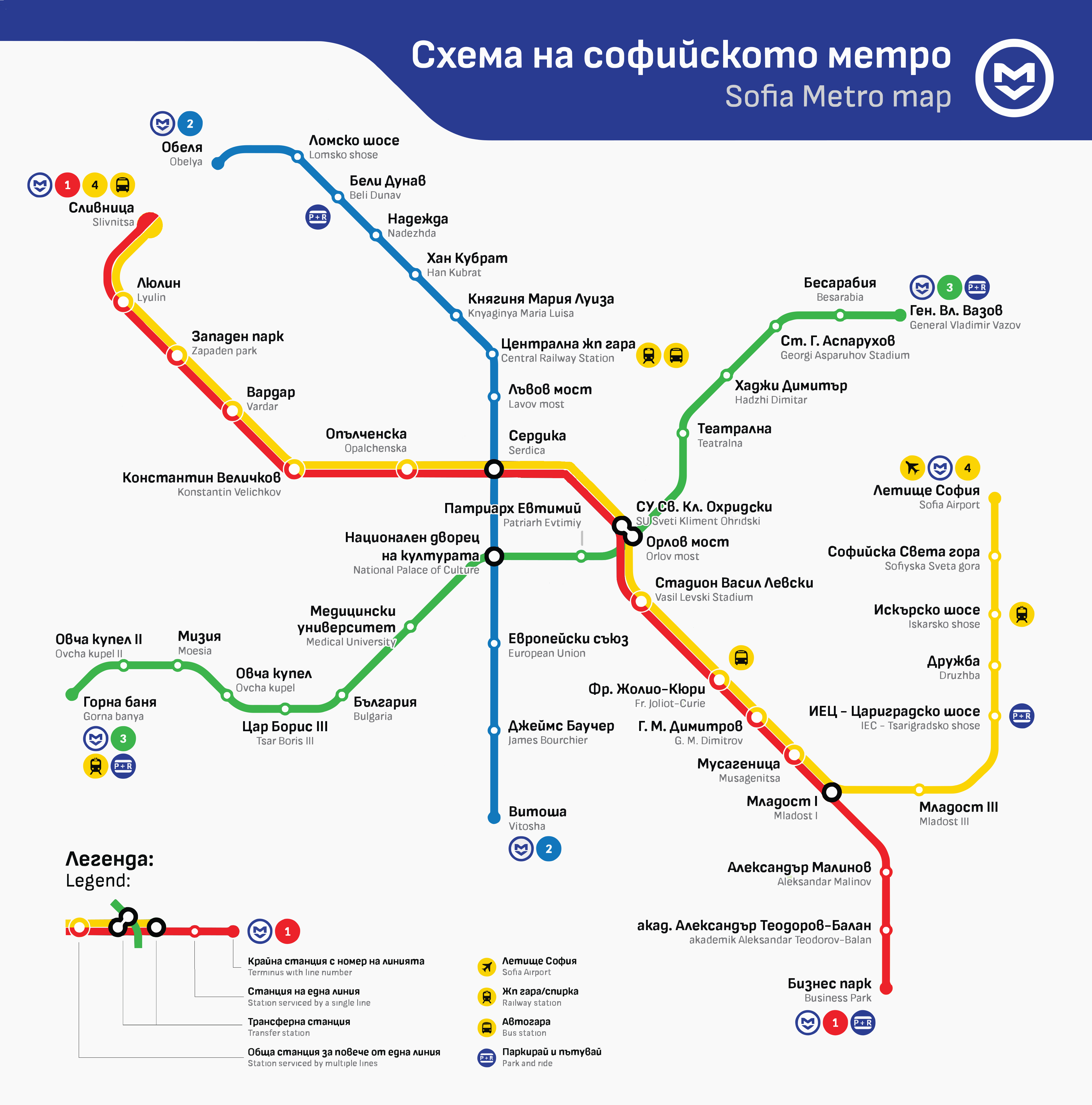

The Sofia Metro (Bulgarian: Софийски метрополитен, romanized: Sofiyski Metropoliten, also colloquially called Bulgarian: Софийско метро, romanized: Sofiysko Metro) is the rapid transit network servicing the Bulgarian capital city Sofia. It is the only metro in Bulgaria. It began operation on 28 January 1998. As of 2026, the Sofia Metro consists of four interconnected lines, serving 50 stations, with a total route length of 55.0 kilometres (34.2 mi) and also being among the top 15 of the most extensive European metro systems, ranking 9th as of 2026. The Metro links the densely populated districts of Lyulin – Mladost (M1 line – Red) and Nadezhda – Lozenets (M2 line – Blue), and serves the Vasil Levski Sofia Airport. A single ride ticket is 0.80 EUR (prevoiously 1,60 leva).

== History ==
Planned since the 1960s, construction of the metro started in the 80s with the demolition of a significant number of buildings. At the beginning of the 90s, construction stopped due to a lack of funds and the complexity of the construction work. Being one of the oldest cities in Europe, Sofia contains many historical layers underneath its central areas. Evidence of antiquity can be clearly seen at the Serdika Station, which exhibits a wealth of unearthed Thracian and Roman ruins. During the construction of the enormous complex of the National Palace of Culture, two stations forming part of the M2 line and their connecting tunnels were built.

The construction of the system began from the route that sees the highest volume of passenger traffic, reaching 38,000 at rush hour.

== Lines ==
Due to an increased population, there are a large number of passengers heading toward the city center during weekday mornings, and away from the city centre in the weekday evenings. The necessity of efficient public transport in the direction of the largest passenger flows, transport, and Sofia's environmental problems precipitated the start of the construction of the Sofia Metro. Following the ratification of a technical and economic report on the metro by the Council of Ministers of Bulgaria, and the subsequently approved General City Plan, the general scheme for the development of the lines should consist of three diameters with extensions in the periphery, with a total length of 66.7 kilometres (41.4 mi), 71 metro stations, and a 1.2 million daily passenger capacity at the final stage of implementation.

== System ==
| Line | Icon | Opened | Current | | Under construction | | Planned | |
| Line | Icon | Opened | Length km (mi) | Stations | Length km (mi) | Stations | Length km (mi) | Stations |
|---|---|---|---|---|---|---|---|---|
| M1 | | 28/01/1998 | 17.6 (10.9) | 16 | 0 (0.0) | 0 | 19.3 (12.0) | 20 |
| M2 | | 31/08/2012 | 11.7 (7.3) | 13 | 0 (0.0) | 1 | 14.5 (9.0) | 16 |
| M3 | | 26/08/2020 | 14.2 (8.8) | 15 | 0 (0.0) | 0 | 14.2 (8.8) | 15 |
| M4 | | 02/04/2015 (as line M2); 26/08/2020 (separated from M2) | 23.0 (14.3) | 20 | 0 (0.0) | 1 | 22.1 (13.7) | 20 |
| M5 | | Future | 0 (0.0) | 0 | 0 (0.0) | 0 | 16.0 (9.9) | 16 |
| M6 | | Future | 0 (0.0) | 0 | 5.5 (3.4) | 6 | 16.0 (9.9) | 16 |
| Total | | | 49.0 (30.4) | 50 | 5.5 (3.4) | 7 | 66.7 (41.4) | 71 |

=== M1 line (Red) ===
The first 6.5 kilometres (4.0 mi) long section of M1 line consisting of five stations linking Slivnitsa Boulevard through Lyulin and K. Velichkov Boulevard was inaugurated on 28 January 1998. Opalchenska station entered into service on 17 September 1999 and Serdika station situated on St Nedelya Square followed on 31 October 2000, extending the total system length to 8.1 kilometres (5.0 mi). The operational section of the line was further extended with a 1.8 kilometres (1.1 mi) long section, reaching Obelya housing estate in April 2003.

The extension of M1 line continued in 2005 with the start of the construction of 4.8 kilometres (3.0 mi) of tunnels and three stations linking St Nedelya Square and the Interped World Trade Center in Izgrev (station Frédéric Joliot-Curie). 2006 saw the start of the construction of another section of the same line (consisting of 3.2 kilometres (2.0 mi) of tunnels and three stations) linking Izgrev and Mladost I housing estate. The completion of the first three stations was projected for the autumn of 2007, however as a result of various delays it was the second section from the first line (Vasil Levski stadium – Mladost 1) that first entered into service on 8 May 2009, operating for a brief period of time separately from the north-west portion of the line. The remaining section between Serdika and Vasil Levski stadium station finally entered into service on 7 September 2009 establishing an uninterrupted link between Obelya and Mladost 1 stations.

The construction of the section from Mladost I to Business Park Sofia station (2.62 kilometres (1.63 mi), with three new underground stations) began on 25 April 2013, and was completed on 8 May 2015. It cost 43,852,320 EUR, VAT exclusive, and serves the majority of the second most densely populated area in Sofia. Part of the sections of "Sofia Airport" - "Iskarsko Shose" and, Ovcha kupel" -, Krasno selo" are not underground.

Struma and Tsaritsa Yoanna stations are a planned extension of M1 line, west of Lyulin station. Their construction will start in 2027-2028, and when completed, M1 split from the M4 after Lyulin station. M4 will continue to serve Slivnitsa and Pancho Vladigerov stations.

| Station | Image | In service since | Exits | Intermodality | Location |
|---|---|---|---|---|---|
| Dobrinova skala Добринова скала | | planned | | | Near Lyulin III housing estate, on Sofia Ring Road |
| Tsaritsa Yoanna; Царица Йоанна | | planned | | | Near Lyulin II housing estate |
| Slivnitsa; Сливница | | 28 January 1998 | 4 | first station of the shared section with M4 | Slivnitsa Blvd and Pancho Vladigerov Blvd |
| Lyulin; Люлин | | 28 January 1998 | 4 | | Tsaritsa Yoanna Blvd in Lyulin |
| Zapaden Park; Западен парк | | 28 January 1998 | 8 | | Tsaritsa Yoanna Blvd and Dr. Petar Dertliev Blvd |
| Vardar; Вардар | | 28 January 1998 | 6 | | Tsaritsa Yoanna Blvd and Vardar Blvd |
| Konstantin Velichkov; Константин Величков | | 28 January 1998 | 3 | | Todor Aleksandrov Blvd and Konstantin Velichkov Blvd |
| Opalchenska; Опълченска | | 17 September 1999 | 6 | | Todor Aleksandrov Blvd and Opalchenska St |
| Serdica; Сердика | | 31 October 2000 | 12 | | Todor Aleksandrov Blvd and Knyaginya Maria Luisa Blvd |
| Sofia University Sveti Kliment Ohridski; СУ „Св. Климент Охридски“ | | 7 September 2009 | 13 | | Tsar Osvoboditel Blvd in front of Sofia University |
| Vasil Levski Stadium; Стадион „Васил Левски“ | | 8 May 2009 | 2 | | Northeastern tip of Borisova Gradina Park, near Vasil Levski National Stadium |
| Frédéric Joliot-Curie; Фр. Жолио Кюри | | 8 May 2009 | 2 | Yug Bus Station | Dragan Tsankov Blvd in Iztok |
| G. M. Dimitrov; Г. М. Димитров | | 8 May 2009 | 4 | | Dr. Georgi Mihov Dimitrov Blvd and Dragan Tsankov Blvd |
| Musagenitsa; Мусагеница | | 8 May 2009 | 1 | | Western end of Prof. Marko Semov Blvd bridge |
| Mladost I Младост I | | 8 May 2009 | 5 | last station of the shared section with M4 | Jerusalem St and Andrey Sakharov Blvd |
| Aleksandar Malinov; Александър Малинов | | 8 May 2015 | 6 | | Aleksandrov Malinov Blvd and Andrey Lyapchev Blvd in Mladost II/III |
| Akad. Aleksandar Teodorov-Balan; Акад. Александър Теодоров-Балан | | 8 May 2015 | 6 | | Aleksandrov Malinov Blvd and Dr. Atanas Moskov St in Mladost II/III |
| Business Park Sofia; Бизнес Парк София | | 8 May 2015 | 4 | Park and ride facility | Aleksandar Malinov Blvd, adjacent to Business Park Sofia in Mladost IV |

=== M2 and M4 lines (Blue/Yellow) ===
The second and fourth lines of the Sofia Metro links the districts of Obelya, Nadezhda, the city centre and Lozenets to the south of the city. Half of the construction cost was covered by the European Union, with the remaining part funded by the state and city budgets. Construction of the 6.4 km (4.0 mi) section between Nadezhda interchange and Lozenets district via Central railway station and the National Palace of Culture started on 14 December 2008. Work on the section between Obelya residential District and Nadezhda started in February 2010. Both sections of the line entered into service on 31 August 2012.

NDK and European Union stations and their connecting tunnels were partly completed during the construction of the National Palace of Culture and the redevelopment of the surrounding area in the late 1970s and early 1980s.

The construction of Mladost 3 and Inter Expo Center – Tsarigradsko shose stations began on 15 February 2009 and was completed on 25 April 2012. The further extension to Sofia Airport comprising two underground and two overground stations and a length of 4.968 kilometres (3.087 mi) began in 2013, and was completed on 2 April 2015 at the cost of 69,923,066 EUR, VAT exclusive. This extension was briefly operated as a branch of M1 line, but was soon transferred to M2 line, moving that line's terminus from Obelya to Sofia Airport.

On 20 July 2016, the line was extended southward with 1.3 km (0.81 mi) and one station, Vitosha, located at Hladilnika neighbourhood. The construction took 2 years.

Provisions have been made for the construction of future branch to Iliyantsi, starting from the existing junction located between Knyaginya Maria Luiza and Han Kubrat stations.

On 26 August 2020, the M2 line was split into two portions: the M2, running from Vitosha station to Obelya station, and the M4, running from Obelya to Sofia Airport. The trains continue to run the length of both lines but on maps and other metro signage the M4 line is gradually being introduced. The split was in preparation to the construction of the Pancho Vladigerov station, which will physically separate the lines and will allow them to have independent timetables. On 19 July 2025, M4 was cut to Slivnitsa, while M2 was cut to Obelya, due to the construction of the new Pancho Vladigerov station, which will open sometime in 2026.

==== M2 line (Blue) ====
| Station | Image | Opened | Exits | Intermodality | Location |
|---|---|---|---|---|---|
| Obelya; Обеля | | 20 April 2003 | 2 | Trains arriving from Vitosha station continue as M4 trains to Sofia Airport. Trains arriving as M4 trains from Sofia Airport continue as M2 trains to Vitosha. Previously operated by Line M1. | Obelya over the Kakach river |
| Lomsko shose Ломско шосе | | 31 August 2012 | 4 | | Lomsko shose Blvd in Vrabnitsa |
| Beli Dunav; Бели Дунав | | 31 August 2012 | 4 | Park and ride facility | Lomsko shose Blvd and Beli Dunav St, between Nadezhda and Vrabnitsa |
| Nadezhda; Надежда | | 31 August 2012 | 2 | | Lomsko shose Blvd, between Nadezhda I and Nadezhda II |
| Han Kubrat; Хан Кубрат | | 31 August 2012 | 4 | | Lomsko shose, north of Nadezhda Overpass in Triagalnika |
| Knyaginya Maria Luiza; Княгиня Мария Луиза | | 31 August 2012 | 4 | | Knyaginya Maria Luisa Blvd, south of Nadezhda Overpass in Banishora |
| Central Railway Station; Централна ж.п. гара | | 31 August 2012 | 15 | BDZ trains, intercity and international buses | Knyaginya Maria Luisa Blvd, in front of Sofia Central Station and Central Bus Station Sofia |
| Lavov most Лъвов мост | | 31 August 2012 | 4 | | Knyaginya Maria Luisa Blvd, north of Lavov Most |
| Serdica II; Сердика II | | 31 August 2012 | 12 | | Knyaginya Maria Luisa Blvd, in front of Central Hali |
| National Palace of Culture; Национален дворец на културата | | 31 August 2012 | 11 | | Northern end of the park of the National Palace of Culture |
| European Union; Европейски съюз | | 31 August 2012 | 6 | | Cherni vrah Blvd, near Earth and Man National Museum and City Center Sofia |
| James Bourchier; Джеймс Баучер | | 31 August 2012 | 4 | | James Bourchier Blvd in Lozenets |
| Vitosha; Витоша | | 20 July 2016 | 6 | | Cherni vrah Blvd, near Paradise Center in Hladilnika |
| Cherni vrah Черни връх | | planned | | Southbound M5 diverges from M2 after this station. | Cherni vrah Blvd, between Prof. Marin Goleminov St and Dimitar Manchev St |
| Dragalevtsi; Драгалевци | | planned | | | Sofia Ring Road interchange with Cherni vrah Blvd |

==== M4 line (Yellow) ====
| Station | Image | Opened | Exits | Intermodality | Location |
|---|---|---|---|---|---|
| Obelya; Обеля | | 20 April 2003 (withdrawn 19 July 2025) | 2 | Trains arriving from Vitosha continue as M4 trains to Sofia Airport. M4 trains arriving from Sofia Airport continue as M2 trains to Vitosha. Previously operated by line M1 | Obelya, over the Kakach river |
| Pancho Vladigerov; Панчо Владигеров | | under construction | 2 | M2 and M4 terminate | Beneath the National Rail, near Obelya Depot |
Slivnitsa – Mladost I section shared with M1; see line
| Mladost III; Младост III | | 25 April 2012 | 4 | | Andrej Sakharov Blvd, Resen St, and Gen. Radko Dimitriev St |
| Inter Expo Center – Tsarigradsko shose Интер Експо Център – Цариградско шосе | | 25 April 2012 | 4 | Park and ride facility | Tsarigradsko shose near Inter Expo Center; Tunnel exit in Druzhba II |
| Druzhba; Дружба | | 2 April 2015 | 7 | | Between Prof. Tsvetan Lazarov Blvd and Kapt. Dimitar Spisarevski St |
| Iskarsko shose Искърско шосе | | 2 April 2015 | 6 | BDZ trains at Iskarsko shose Railway station | Iskarsko shose and Krastyo Pastuhov Blvd |
| Sofiyska Sveta Gora; Софийска Света гора | | 2 April 2015 | 2 | | Iskar Industrial zone |
| Sofia Airport; Летище София | | 2 April 2015 | 1 | Sofia Airport, Terminal 2 | The departures gate of Sofia Airport, Terminal 2 |

=== M3 line (Green) ===
The 16 km (9.9 mi) long M3 line is planned to connect the Ovcha Kupel neighbourhood (in southwest Sofia) and the Vasil Levski neighbourhood (in northeast Sofia), with 16 stations in total, including two transfer stations in the city centre, with the rest of the already operational lines. The first 8 stations of the line entered service on 26 August 2020, and another 4 on 24 April 2021. On 14 August 2026, 3 new stations were put into operation on the northern end.

The original plan was to have 8 aboveground and 11 underground stations. The project design contract was awarded to the Czech company Metroprojekt Praha a.s.

In March 2014, a tender for construction of the central section of the line was announced. The section is 7 km (4.3 mi) long and includes 7 stations, two of them transfer to lines 1 and 2. With the announcement of the tender, it became clear that the initial plans for 19 stations had been partly amended and 2 of the stations, one at Doyran boulevard and another at Shipka street, will not be built. The tunnel of the central section shall be excavated by a tunnel boring machine, while the construction of stations shall be awarded to other companies. The construction of the section shall be completed within 45 months. In January 2015, a tender for 20 trains that shall serve the central section of the line was announced. Driverless train operation, with Grade of Automation 3 (GoA 3), and platform screen doors will ensure the safety of the passengers. Unlike lines 1, 2 and 4, where the trains collect power through a third rail, line 3 trains will be equipped with pantographs. CAF and Siemens applied bids in the tender for the trains, with Siemens winning it.

In early 2016, construction began on the third metro line of the Sofia Metro using the technology for classic underground metro with high-power support. Under construction were all metro stations in the central section, the ones in the west and some in the central-east of downtown Sofia. The Tsar Boris III - Hadzhi Dimitar section opened on 26 August 2020, with the extension from Tsar Boris III to Gorna banya opening on 24 April 2021.

The third line of the Sofia Metro is planned to have a total of 15 metro stations for the main line and 6 metro stations for the M6 line (Slatina branch), which will split east of Orlov Most. Currently, 15 stations of the main line are in operation, the last 3 having opened on 14 August 2026. The 6 stations on the M6 Slatina Branch are starting construction since early 2023, and are projected to open in mid 2027.

| Station | Image | Opened | Exits | Intermodality | Location |
|---|---|---|---|---|---|
| General Vladimir Vazov; Ген. Владимир Вазов | | 14 August 2026 | 4 | | Vladimir Vazov Blvd and Pop Gruyu St |
| Besarabia; Бесарабия | | 14 August 2026 | 3 | | Vladimir Vazov Blvd and Vitinya St |
| Georgi Asparuhov Stadium; Стадион „Георги Аспарухов" | | 14 August 2026 | 4 | | Georgi Asparuhov Stadium, near the intersection of Vladimir Vazov Blvd and Vasil Kanchev St |
| Hadzhi Dimitar; Хаджи Димитър | | 26 August 2020 | 2 | Poduyane Bus Station | Gen. Vladimir Vazov Blvd and Todorini kukli St in Hadzhi Dimitar |
| Teatralna; Театрална | | 26 August 2020 | 2 | near Poduyane Railway Station | Evlogi i Hristo Georgievi Blvd and Madrid Blvd, near Zaimov park |
| Orlov Most; Орлов мост | | 26 August 2020 | 13 | Connected to SU St. Kliment Ohridski; Future terminus of M6 | Knyazheska gradina park |
| Patriarh Evtimiy; Патриарх Евтимий | | 26 August 2020 | 3 | | On Patriarh Evtimiy Sq |
| National Palace of Culture II; Национален дворец на културата II | | 26 August 2020 | 11 | | Patriarh Evtimiy Blvd and Vitosha Blvd |
| Medical University; Медицински университет | | 26 August 2020 | 5 | | Praha Blvd and Georgi Sofiyski St |
| Bulgaria; България | | 26 August 2020 | 7 | | Bulgaria Blvd and Akad. I. E. Geshov Blvd |
| Tsar Boris III; Цар Борис III | | 26 August 2020 | 4 | | Tsar Boris III Blvd and Zhitnitsa St |
| Ovcha kupel Овча купел | | 24 April 2021 | 5 | | Ovcha Kupel Blvd and President Lincoln Blvd |
| Moesia; Мизия | | 24 April 2021 | 6 | | Montevideo St near New Bulgarian University |
| Ovcha Kupel II; Овча купел II | | 24 April 2021 | 2 | | Tsentralna St and Zhiul Losho |
| Gorna Banya; Горна баня | | 24 April 2021 | 4 | Park and ride facility BDZ trains on railway line №5 | Sofia Ring Road (Boycho Boychev St) and President Lincoln Blvd |

==== M6 line (Purple) under construction ====
The 6 stations serving Geo Milev, Slatina, and Mladost 1 housing estates is projected to exceed 75,000 daily ridership, and will be an important part of the network. At Trakiya station, there will be an underground park-and-ride facility.

| Station | Image | Opened | Location |
|---|---|---|---|
Tsar Boris III – Orlov Most section shared with M3; see line
| Sitnyakovo; Ситняково | | under construction | Geo Milev St and Sitnyakovo Blvd, servicing Oborishte and Yavorov housing estates |
| Geo Milev; Гео Милев | | under construction | Geo Milev St and Nikolai Kopernik St, servicing Geo Milev and Reduta housing estates |
| Slatina; Слатина | | under construction | Geo Milev St and Slatinska St, servicing Slatina and Hristo Smirnenski housing estates |
| SC CSKA; СК ЦСКА | | under construction | Shipchenski Prohod Blvd near Asen Yordanov Blvd, servicing the area near "CSKA Cherveno Zname" sports center |
| Arena Sofia; Арена София | | under construction | Asen Yordanov Blvd near Arena Sofia and Sofia Tech Park |
| Trakiya; Тракия | | under construction | Tsarigradsko shose near Dimitar Mollov St, servicing Mladost 1 and Poligona housing estates and The Mall |

=== M5 line (Brown) planned ===
M5 is a planned line, servicing Studentski grad and Iliyantsi. This line would share more than half of M2's stations.

The Studentski grad branch would start from Cherni vrah Blvd, passing through Vitosha quarter and finally, enter Studentski grad. The Iliyantsi branch would start after Maria Luiza station, joining in on Iliyantsi Blvd, and have 4 stations on it.

Recently, a route has been planned for the Studentski grad branch, including 5 stations with one of them being shared with M2.

| Station | Image | Opened | Intermodality | Location |
|---|---|---|---|---|
| Iliyantsi; Илиянци | | planned | | Iliyantsi housing estate |
| Rozhen; Рожен | | planned | | Iliyantsi shopping center |
| Svoboda; Свобода | | planned | | Svoboda housing estate |
| Tolstoy; Толстой | | planned | | Tolstoy housing estate |
Maria Luiza – Cherni vrah section shared with M2; see line
| Cherni Vrah; Черни Връх | | planned | Shared station between M2 and M5. Southbound M5 diverges from M2 after this station. | Cherni vrah Blvd between Prof. Marin Goleminov St and Dimitar Manchev St |
| Stefan Savov; Стефан Савов | | planned | | Stefan Savov St and Prof. Georgi Manev St |
| Simeonovsko shose Симеоновско шосе | | planned | | Prof Ivan Stransky St and Simeonovsko shose Blvd |
| NSA; НСА | | planned | | Akad. Stefan Mladenov St and Prof. Atanas Ishirkov St |
| Studentski Grad; Студентски Град | | planned | | Akad. Stefan Mladenov St between 8-mi dekemvri St and Iordan Iosifov St |

== Fares and ticketing ==
The price of a single ticket on the metro is 0.80 euro (previously 1,60 leva) It can be issued either by a cashier, or by a vending machine. When obtained, the single ticket must be validated within 30 minutes at a validator. Daily, monthly and yearly tickets and passes are also available.

Since November 1, 2021, one's fare can be paid using a contactless debit or credit card at every station of the network. In addition, passengers can pay using a mobile wallet (Apple Pay, Google Pay, Garmin Pay etc.). The fare is the same price as a paper ticket (0.80 euro for a single) and the amount you pay per day will max out at 2 euro, which is 3 trips (every trip after that is de facto free). The 2 euro max resets every day at 00:00 local time.

== Rolling stock ==
The Sofia Metro operates four types of rolling stock.

=== Type 81 – 717.4/81 – 714.4 and 81 – 717.4K/81 – 714.4K Nomernoy ===
The oldest trainets running in the metropolitan are from type metrovagonmash 81 – 717/81 – 714 Nomernoy (modification 81 – 717.4/81 – 714.4), manufactured by the Mytishchi Machine-Building Plant in Mytishchi, Moscow Oblast, then the Soviet Union, in 1989 – 1990. Forty-eight carriages in total (twenty-four 81 – 717.4 head ones numbered 1001 – 1024 and twenty-four 81 – 714.4 intermediate ones numbered 5001 – 5024) were delivered to Bulgaria in 1990 (some eight years prior to the opening of the first section of the metropolitan, which occurred on 28 January 1998). Initially, the trains consisted of three carriages (two head ones and an intermediate one), while today they are all formed up of four carriages (two head ones and two intermediate ones), allowing for twelve four-car trains in total. Eight of these trainsets have been refurbished and now run as 81 – 717.4K/81 – 714.4K rolling stock, while four retain their original appearance. Both original and the modernised Nomernoy trains are being opertated by the Obelya train depot and serve the M1, M2, and M4 metro lines.

=== Type 81 – 740.2/81 – 741.2 and 81 – 740.2B/81 – 741.2B Rusich ===
The second generation of rolling stock is from type metrovagonmash 81 – 740/81 – 741 (in modifications 81 – 740.2/81 – 741.2 and 81 – 740.2B/81 – 741.2B) Rusich, also manufactured by Metrovagonmash (the Mytishchi Machine-Building Plant's successor) and delivered over four times between 2005 and 2013. In total, there are 40 three-car such trains (9 in modification 81 – 740.2/741.2 and 31 in modification 81 – 740.2B/741.2B), operated by the Obelya train depot and serving the M1, M2, and M4 metro lines. The head carriages (types 81 – 740.2 and 81 – 740.2B) are numbered 2001 – 2080, while the intermediate ones (types 81 – 741.2 and 81 – 741.2B) are numbered 6001 – 6040.

=== Type Siemens Inspiro ===
The third generation of rolling stock in the Sofia Metro is represented by 30 three-car Siemens Inspiro trainsets, delivered between 2016 and 2021. They are being operated by the Zemlyane train depot and serve the M3 metro line exclusively. The head carriages are numbered 3001 – 3060, while the intermediate ones are numbered 7001 – 7030.

=== Type Škoda Sofia 21Mt/22Mt/23Mt ===
In July 2023, Škoda Transportation won a contract worth 65 million EUR to deliver 8 four-car trainsets. The trains are the fourth generation of rolling stock in the Sofia Metro and are of the type Škoda Varsovia with the modification Škoda Sofia 21Mt/22Mt/23Mt. All of them have been in service since the summer of 2026. The Škoda Sofia are being operated by the Obelya train depot and serve the M1, M2, and M4 metro lines. They have air conditioning, LED information displays, door sensors, accessibility zones, and more. The head carriages (type 21Mt) are numbered 4001 – 4016, while the intermediate ones (types 22Mt and 2Mt) are numbered 8001 – 8008 and 9001 – 9008, respectively, with 22Mt standing for intermediate carriages with motors and 23Mt – for intermediate carriages without motors.

On 12 November 2026, Škoda Transportation announced it will supply an additional 16 trainsets to the network. They are all scheduled to be delivered within the next two years.

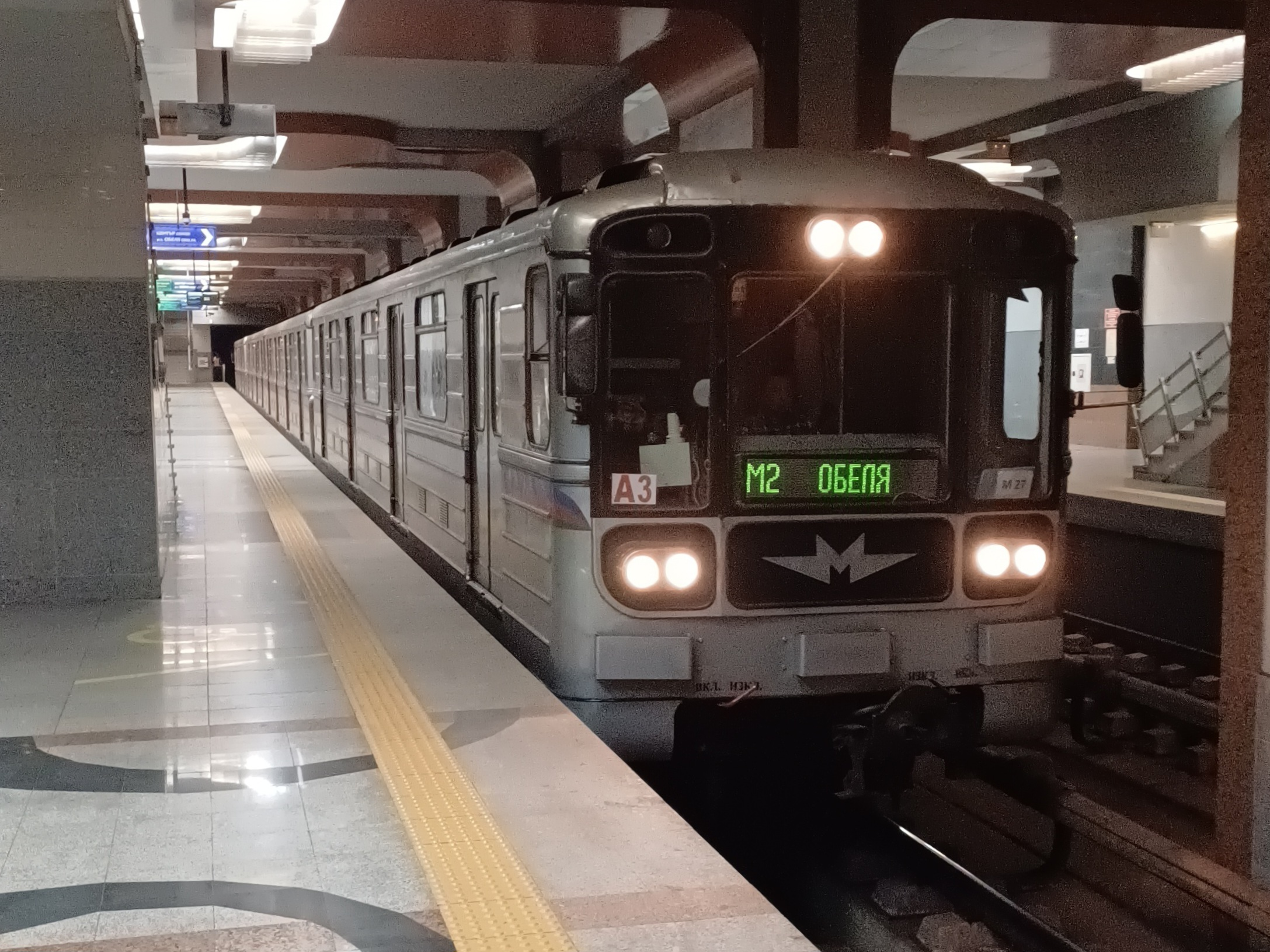
An 81 – 717.4/81 – 714.4 Nomernoy trainset at
James Bourchier Station.

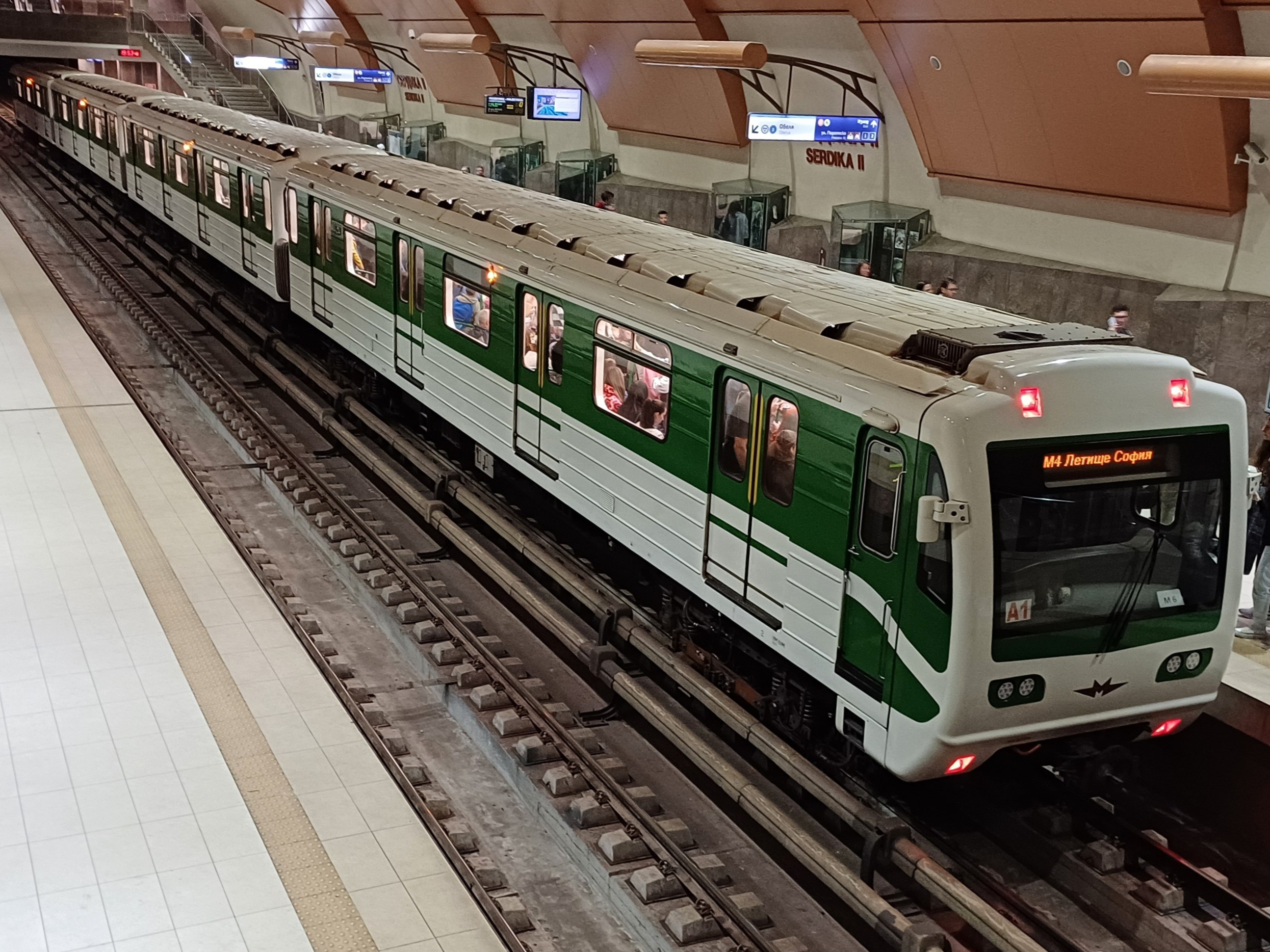
An 81 – 717.4K/81 – 714.4K Nomernoy trainset at
Serdika-2 Station.

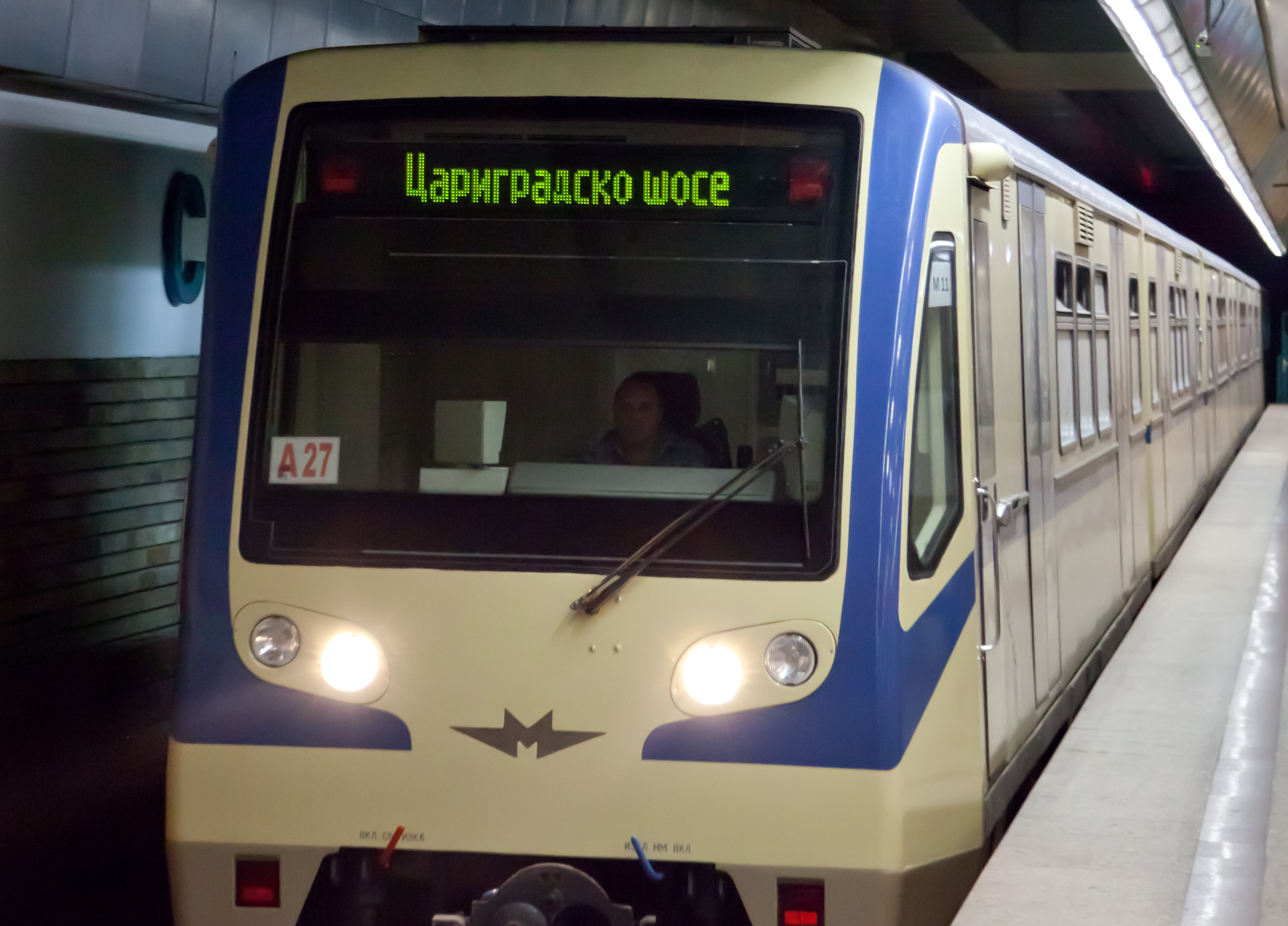
An 81 – 740.2/81 – 741.2 Rusich trainset at Serdika Station.

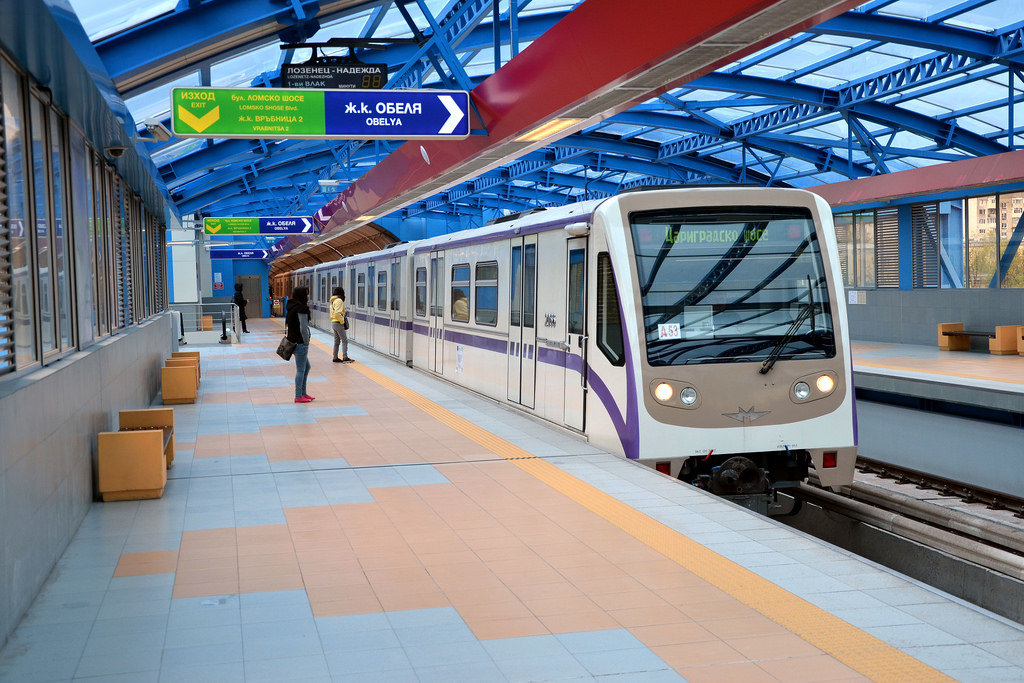
An 81 – 740.2B/81 – 741.2B Rusich trainset at Lomsko shose Station.

A Siemens Inspiro trainset at Hadzhi Dimitar Station.

A Škoda Sofia 21Mt/22Mt/23Mt trainset arriving at the Obelya train depot.

== Platform screen doors and rope screen doors ==
=== Line 1 and 4 ===
On line 1 - (red) and line 4 - (yellow) on 12 stations (see below) are installed rope screen doors. The doors open vertically. The doors have 8 parts:

1. Entry sensor - detects when the train arrives at station.
2. RSD - The doors.
3. Platform control panel (PCP) - is placed on some of columns on the doors. The PCP box has two buttons - one red and green - used for manual operation of the doors.
4. Emergency opening of doors - on the back of the columns there is a box with three buttons - Red - close; Green - open; Yellow - emergency open. This device is used for emergency opening of the doors.
5. Train information panel - Controls the whole system.
6. Driver information display - Displays the status of the doors and if the trains is aligned correctly with the platform.
7. Laser sensor - Detects how close is the train to the stop point.
8. Exit sensor - Detects when the train departs from the station.

Stations that have these doors:

1. Slivnitsa - line 1 and 4
2. Lyulin - line 1 and 4
3. Zapaden Park - line 1 and 4
4. Vardar - line 1 and 4
5. K. Velichkov - line 1 and 4
6. Opalchenska - line 1 and 4
7. Serdica - line 1 and 4
8. Su. Sv. Kliment Ohridski - line 1 and 4
9. Vasil Levski Stadium - line 1 and 4
10. G.M. Dimitrov - line 1 and 4
11. Mladost 1 - line 1 and 4
12. IEC - Tsarigradsko Shose - line 4

=== Line 3 ===
On line 3, there are installed platform screen doors at all stations. These doors open horizontally, unlike on lines 1 and 4.

== Ridership ==
Sofia Metro ridership
| Year | Passengers per day | Change | Stations |
|---|---|---|---|
| 1998 | 10,000 | N/A | 5 |
| 1999 | 40,000 | ▲300.0 | 6 |
| 2000 | 70,000 | ▲75.0 | 7 |
| 2001 | 80,000 | ▲14.2 | 7 |
| 2002 | 90,000 | ▲12.5 | 7 |
| 2003 | 80,000 | ▼12.5 | 8 |
| 2004 | 75,000 | ▼6.6 | 8 |
| 2005 | 70,000 | ▼7.1 | 8 |
| 2006 | 80,000 | ▲14.2 | 8 |
| 2007 | 90,000 | ▲12.5 | 8 |
| 2008 | 76,000 | ▼15.6 | 8 |
| 2009 | 201,000 | ▲164.5 | 14 |
| 2010 | 187,000 | ▼7.0 | 14 |
| 2011 | 190,000 | ▲1.6 | 14 |
| 2012 | 350,000 | ▲84.2 | 27 |
| 2013 | 280,000 | ▼20.0 | 27 |
| 2014 | 320,000 | ▲14.3 | 27 |
| 2015 | 335,000 | ▲4.7 | 34 |
| 2016 | 350,000(estimated) | ▲4.5 | 35 |
| 2017 | 350,000 | 0.0 | 35 |
| 2018 | 350,000 | 0.0 | 35 |
| 2019 | 350,000 | 0.0 | 35 |
| 2020 | 200,000 (estimated) | ▼75.0 | 43 |
| 2021 | 200,000 (estimated) | ▼75.0 | 47 |
| 2022 | 400,000 | ▲70.0 | 47 |
| 2023 | 380,000 | ▼23.7 | 47 |
| 2024 | 470,000 | ▲- | 47 |
| 2025 | 470,000 | ▲17.2 | 47 |
| 2026 | 550,000 | ▲13 | 50 |

== See also public transport systems ==
Systems in sofia

- Trams in Sofia
- Trolleybuses in Sofia
- Public buses in Sofia
- Sofia Public Transport

Systems around the world

- List of metro systems
