= Business Park Sofia station =

Sofia metro station

Business Park Sofia Бизнес парк София
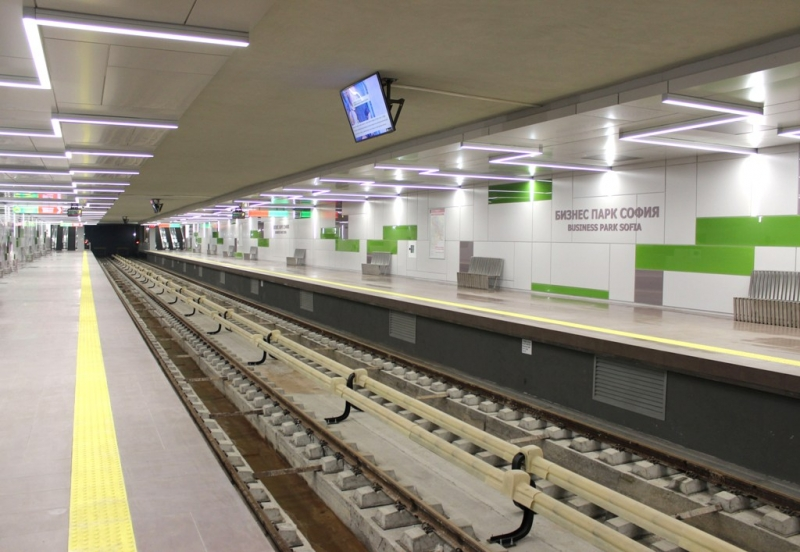

General information
- Location: 1715 Mladost 4, Sofia
- Coordinates: 42°37′45″N 23°22′23″E
- Owner: Sofia Municipality
- Operator: Metropoliten JSC
- Platforms: side
- Tracks: 2
- Bus routes: 7
- Connections
- Bus: 76, 111, 314, 413, X9, X10, N1

Construction
- Structure type: sub-surface
- Platform levels: 2
- Parking: yes
- Cycle facilities: yes
- Accessible: an ramp to entrance
- Architect: Farit Paktiawal

Other information
- Status: Staffed
- Station code: 3043; 3044
- Website: Official website

History
- Opened: 8 May 2015

Passengers
- 2020: 335,000

Services
Preceding station	Sofia Metro	Following station
Akademik Aleksandar Teodorov - Balan towards Slivnitsa	M1 line	Terminus
Location

Business Park Sofia Metro Station (Bulgarian: Метростанция "Бизнес парк София") is a station on the Sofia Metro in Bulgaria. It started operation on 8 May 2015.

== Interchange with other public transport ==
- Bus service: 76, 111, 314, 413, X9, X10
- Night Bus service: N1

== Location ==
The Business Park Sofia Metro Station is situated near Business Park Sofia and serves Mladost 4 housing estate.
