= Slivnitsa Metro Station =

Sofia metro station

Slivnitsa Сливница
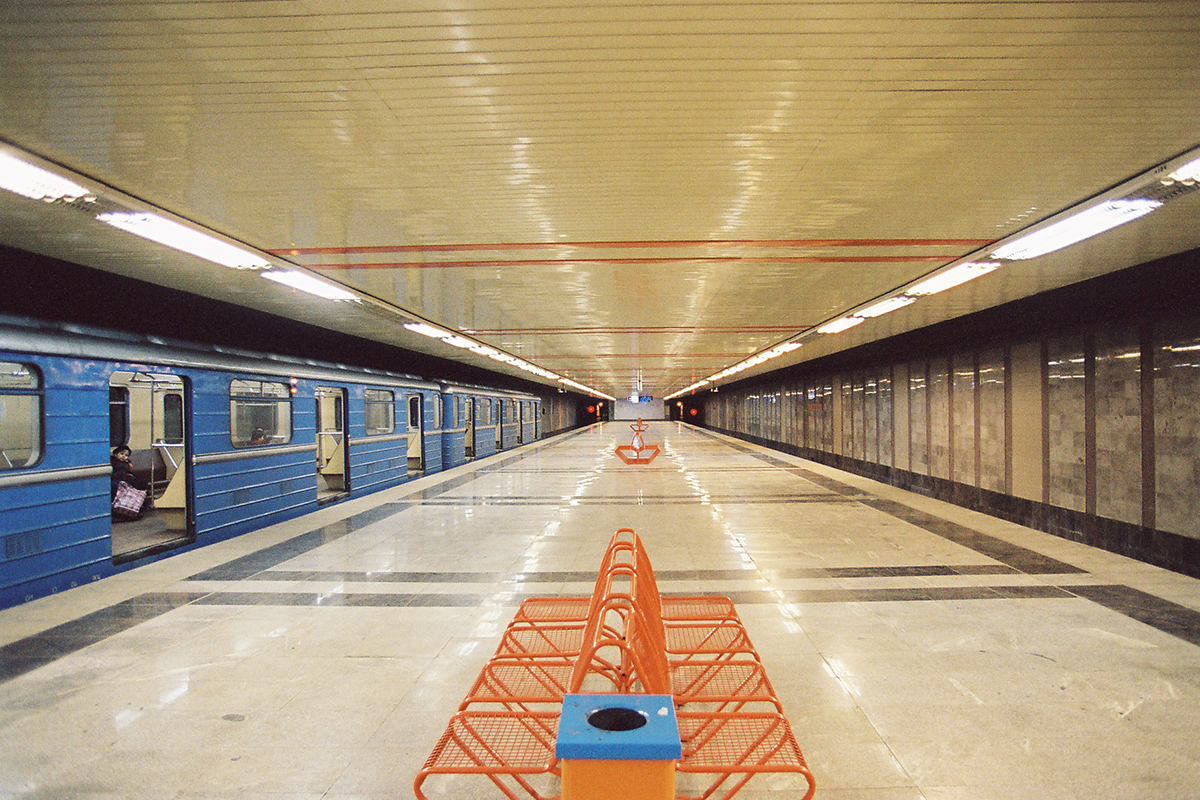

General information
- Location: 1324 Lyulin 8, Sofia
- Coordinates: 42°43′36″N 23°15′42″E
- Owner: Sofia Municipality
- Operator: Metropoliten JSC
- Platforms: island
- Tracks: 2
- Bus routes: 8
- Connections
- Bus: 47, 48, 49, 54, 81, 82, 108, 309

Construction
- Structure type: sub-surface
- Platform levels: 2
- Parking: no
- Cycle facilities: no
- Accessible: an elevator to platforms
- Architect: K. Bochkov and B. Sedmakov

Other information
- Status: Staffed
- Station code: 3001; 3002
- Website: Official website

History
- Opened: 28 January 1998

Passengers
- 2020: 250,000

Services
Preceding station	Sofia Metro	Following station
Terminus	M1 line	Lyulin towards Business Park Sofia
Terminus	M4 line	Lyulin towards Sofia Airport
Suspended services
Preceding station	Sofia Metro	Following station
Obelya Terminus	M4 line	Lyulin towards Sofia Airport
Future services
Preceding station	Sofia Metro	Following station
Pancho Vladigerov Opening 2026 Terminus	M4 line	Lyulin towards Sofia Airport
Location

Slivnitza Metro Station (Bulgarian: Метростанция „Сливница“) is a station on the Sofia Metro in Bulgaria. It opened on 28 January 1998.

== Interchange with other public transport ==
- City Bus service: 82, 108, 309
- Suburban Bus service: 47, 48, 49, 54, 81
