= Largo, Sofia =

Architectural ensemble of three Socialist Classicism edifices in central Sofia

Independence Square
- Largo
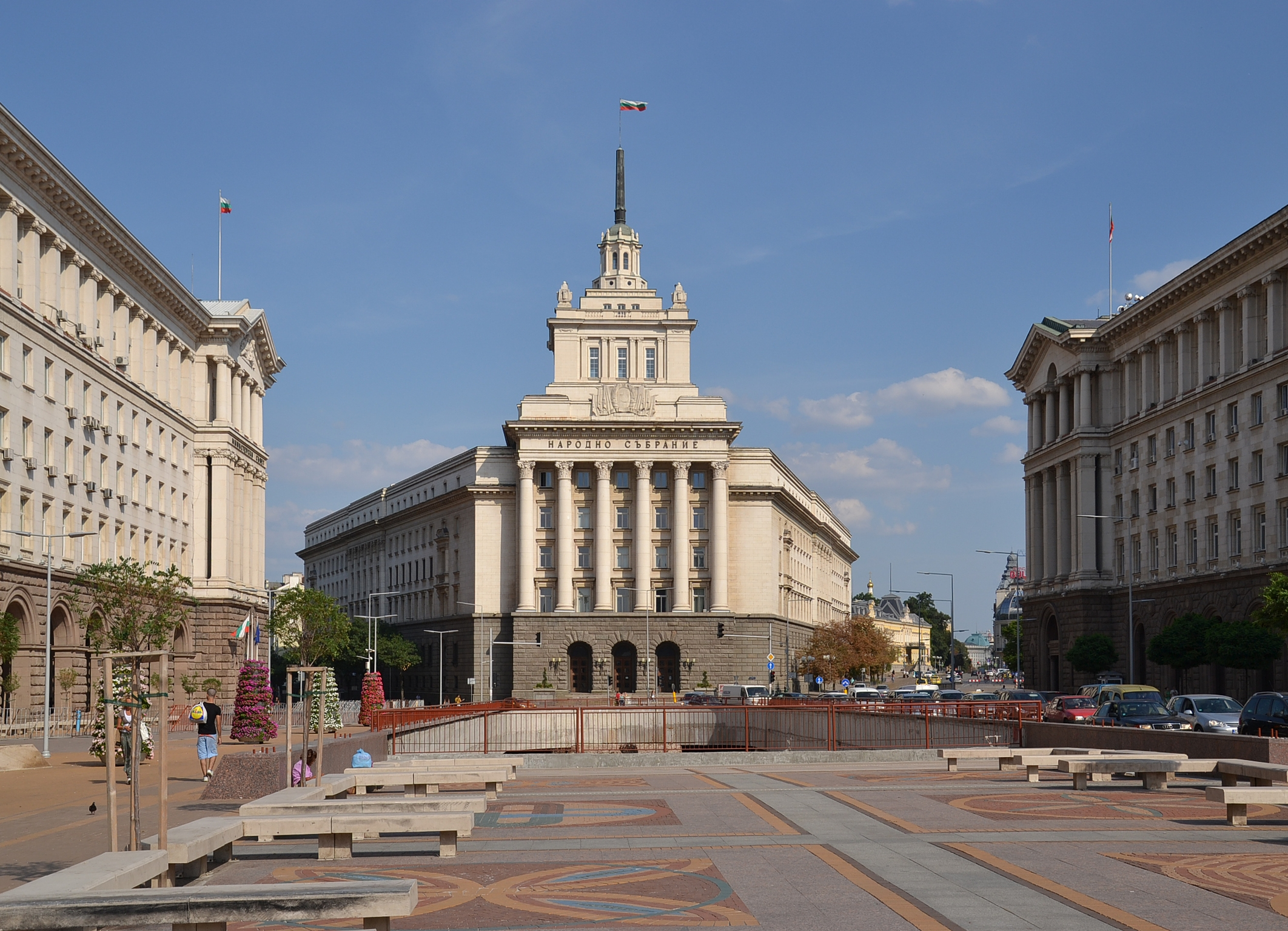
- View of the Largo from the west
- Interactive map of Independence Square
- Native name: площад „Независимост“ (Bulgarian)
- Type: Public square
- Length: 200 m (660 ft)
- Width: 50 m
- Location: Sofia, Bulgaria
- Coordinates: 42°41′52″N 23°19′23″E

Construction
- Completion: 1955

The Largo (Bulgarian: Ларго, definite form Ларгото, Largoto) is an architectural ensemble of three Socialist Classicism buildings around Independence Square (Bulgarian: площад „Независимост“) in central Sofia, the capital of Bulgaria. It was designed and built in the 1950s with the intention of becoming the city's new representative centre. Today it is regarded as one of the prime examples of Socialist Classicism architecture in Southeastern Europe, as well as one of the main landmarks of Sofia.

The Largo complex consists of three buildings around Independence Square: the Council of Ministers and the TSUM department store on the north side, the National Assembly (former Communist Party (BCP) headquarters, known as the "Party House") with its iconic spire on the east side, the Presidential Administration (former Council of State) and the Balkan Hotel to the south side. Plans for a 16-storey House of Soviets on the east side, resembling the Moscow State University main building, were not carried out following de-Stalinisation.

== History ==
The yellow-cobblestoned square around which the ensemble is centred is called Independence Square. It is formed by the Knyaz Aleksandar Dondukov Boulevard and Tsar Osvoboditel Boulevard merging from the east to continue as Todor Aleksandrov Boulevard west of the Largo. Originally, the square was named after Lenin. A Council of Ministers of Bulgaria decree was published in 1951 regarding the construction of the Largo. The lot in the centre of the city, damaged by the bombing of Sofia in World War II, was cleared in the autumn of 1952, so that the construction of the new buildings could begin in the following years.

The Party House building, once crowned by a red star on a pole, was designed by a team under architect Petso Zlatev and completed in 1955. The building of today's Presidential Administration and Balkan Hotel, the work of Petso Zlatev, Petar Zagorski and other architects, was finished the following year, while today's Council of Ministers and TSUM part of the edifice, designed by a team under Kosta Nikolov, followed in 1957. The fountain between the Presidential Administration and the older National Archaeological Museum was shaped in 1958. Plans for a 16-storey House of Soviets on the east side, resembling the Moscow State University main building, were not carried out following de-Stalinisation. Instead, a statue of Vladimir Lenin was erected on the east side of the square in 1966, which was replaced by the one of St. Sophia in 2000.

=== 1990 Fire ===
On 26 August 1990, a fire broke out at the "party house", then the headquarters of the Bulgarian Socialist Party (BSP), successor to the BCP. According to Svetlana Vladimirova, writing for Standart, the fire was set by Plamen Stanchev, who acted because the party had retained the communist red star on the building at that time, despite previously promising to remove it. Vladimirova describes the star as a symbol of a "foreign state." The fire lasted for hours, (Note: Different sources give different time estimates for how long the building burned, varying from 4–7 hours.) destroying forty rooms and a number of documents. Competing allegations circulated about responsibility for the arson: Colonel Lyuben Levicharov alleged that members of Podkrepa set the fire, while Volen Siderov alleged that the BSP controlled the building throughout the incident and deliberately set the fire to remove a tent encampment outside. Vladimirova notes that Podkrepa leader Konstantin Trenchev had previously criticized the continued presence of the star. Vladimirova also reports that a judge involved in related cases said that most of those charged were association football ultras from Levski and CSKA who mixed with the crowd outside the building. Sofia municipal councillor and former National Assembly member Vili Lilkov later stated:

The first months after 1989 were actively used by State Security officers, whose task was to destroy or appropriate the service's archives. Another truth is that many of the Ministry of Interior archives were stored in the Party House building, traces of which are also being lost.

=== Refurbishment ===
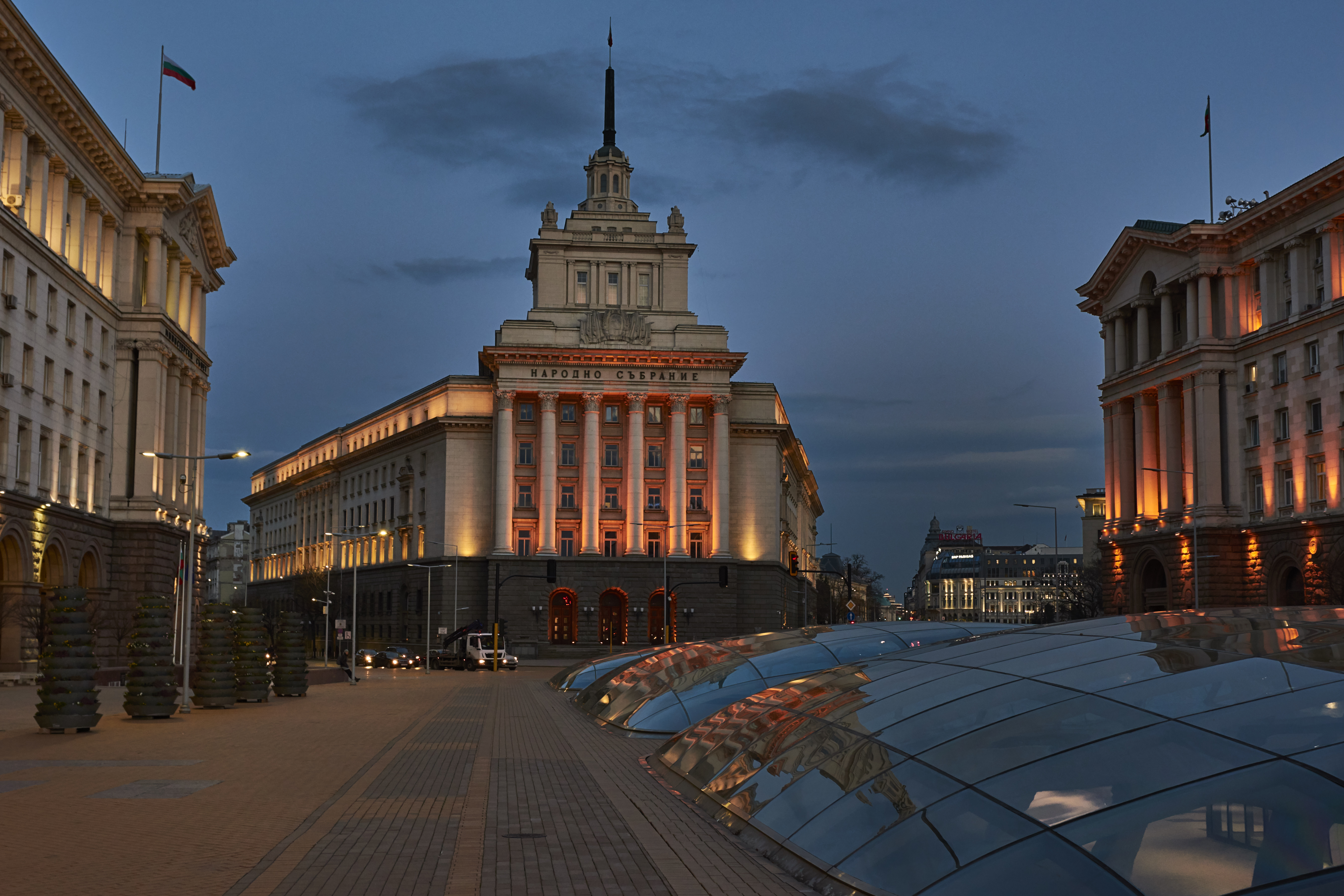
Transparent cover over the ruins of ancient Serdica

Following the fall of communism and democratisation of Bulgaria after 1989, communist symbols around the Largo were removed. The prominent red star atop the former "Party House" was removed using a helicopter and replaced with the flag of Bulgaria. In the 1990s there were suggestions to remake the former Party House, sometimes regarded as an imposing remnant of a past ideology, by introducing more modern architectural elements.

Independence Square was reorganised in 2006 under the new architectural plan of Sofia. The lawn and the flags in the centre were replaced by glass domes, in order to expose the ruins of the ancient Thracian and Roman city of Serdica in an impressive way and create a new tourist attraction. Two underpasses, the one in front of the former Party House and the one with the medieval Church of St Petka, were also connected to ease access to the nearby Serdika and Serdika II stations of the Sofia Metro.

== National Assembly meeting place ==
The National Assembly has relocated between the Old Parliament House and the former Party House in the Largo, multiple times. As of 2026, the National Assembly again meets in the former Party House in the Largo. The renovated former Party House can accommodate any future meetings of the Grand National Assembly, a special parliamentary session with more members than the regular National Assembly.

== Gallery ==
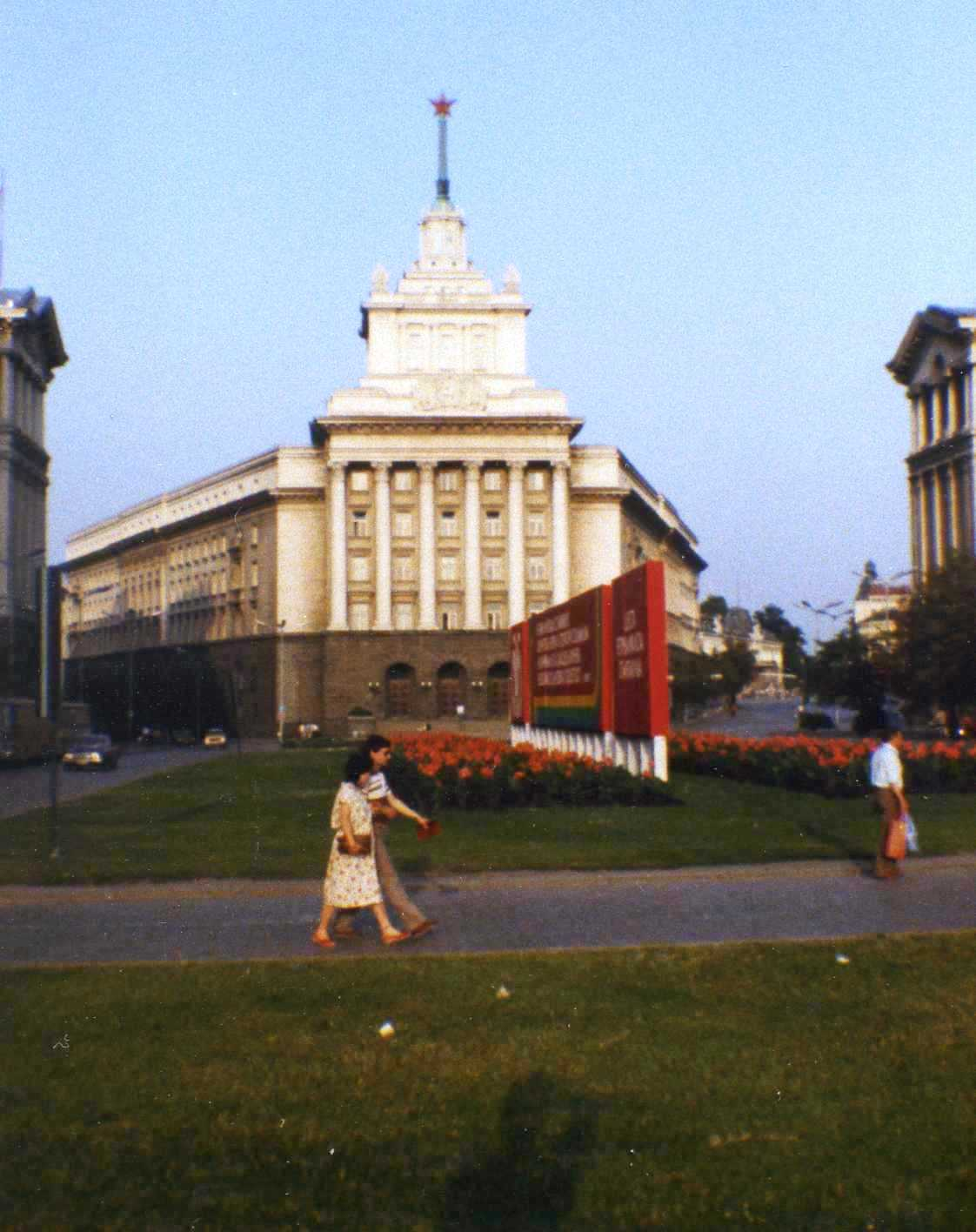
The former Party House in 1984, before the removal of the red star from the spire

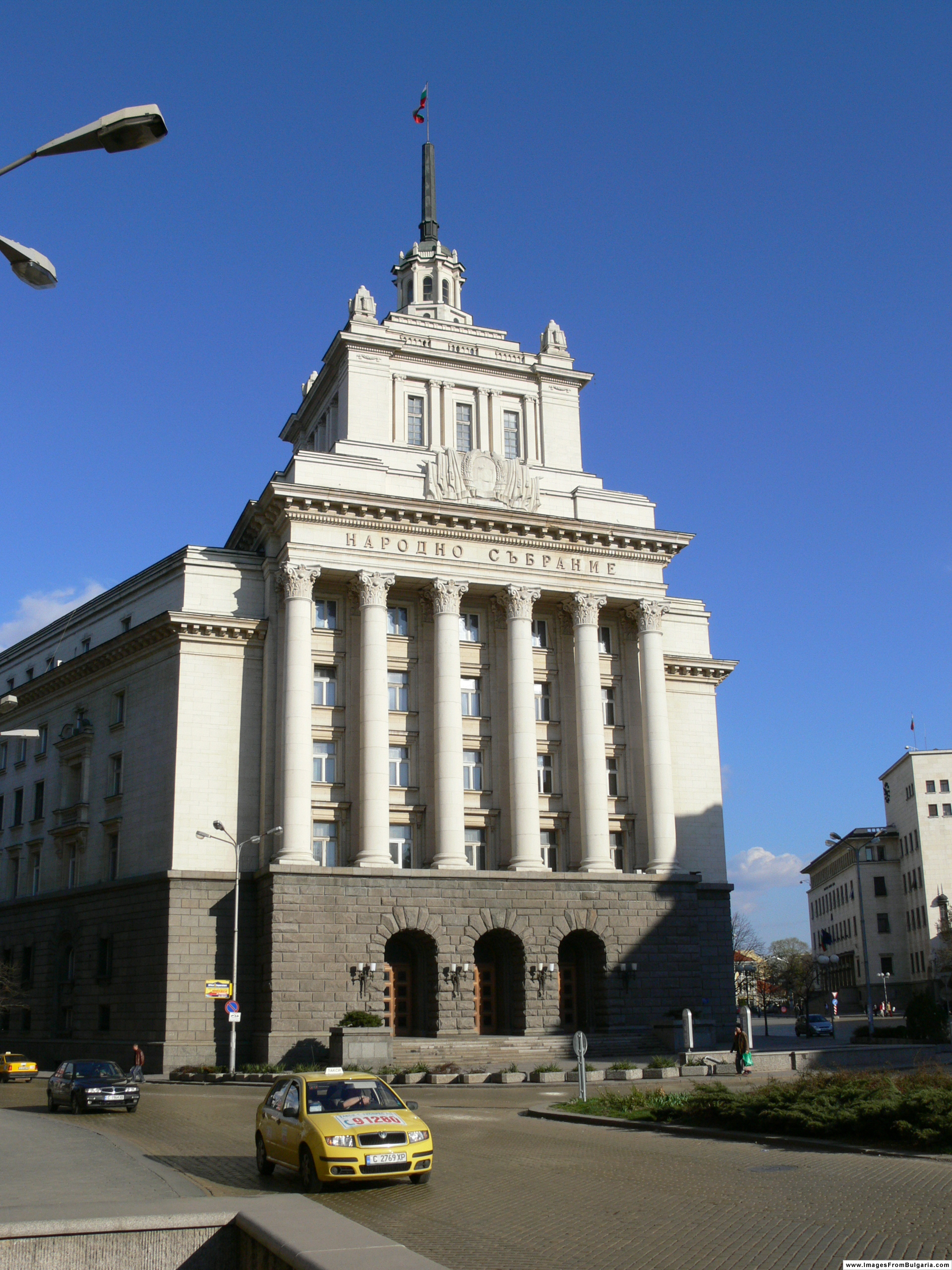
The former Party House in 2006

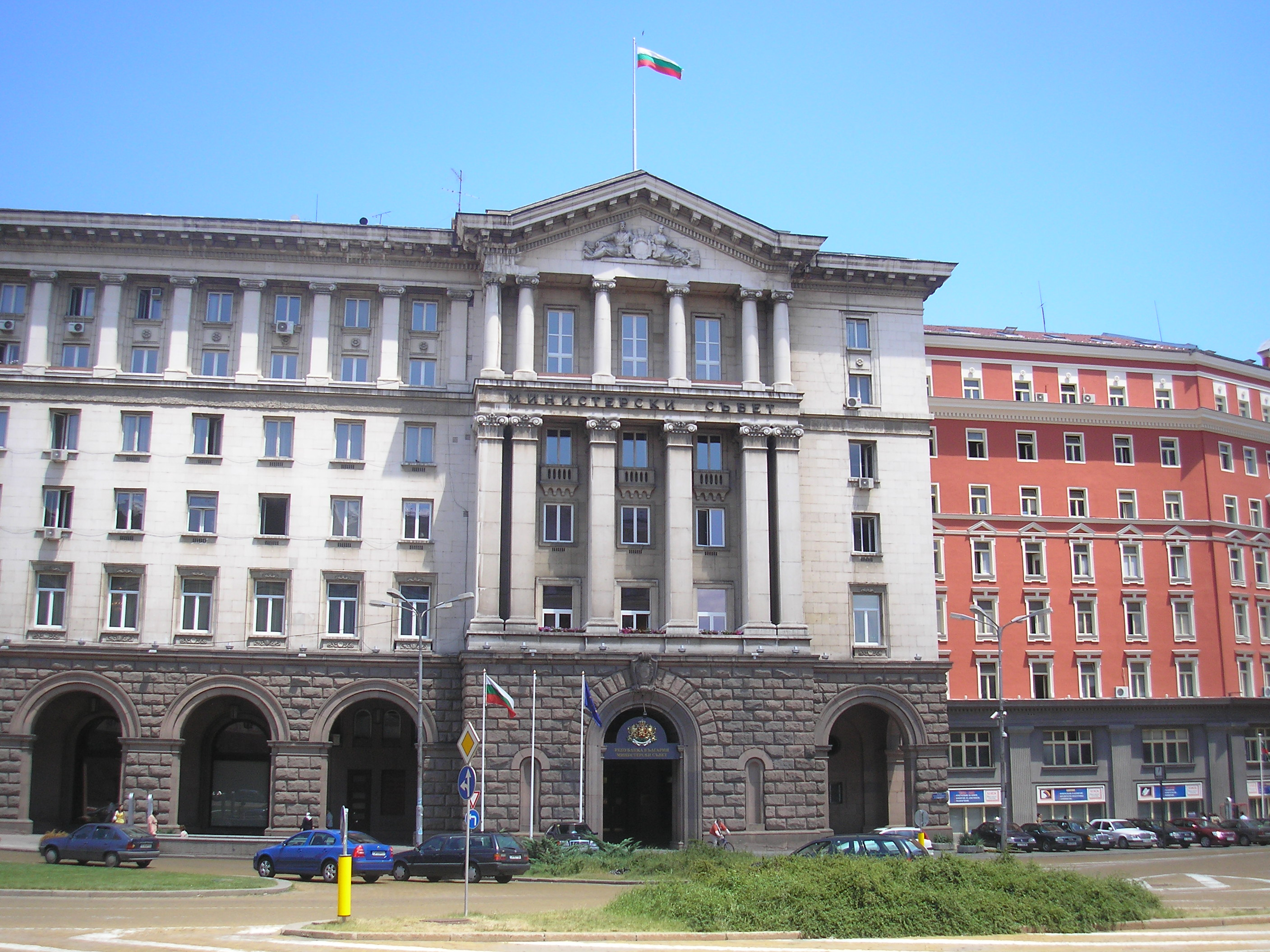
Council of Ministers

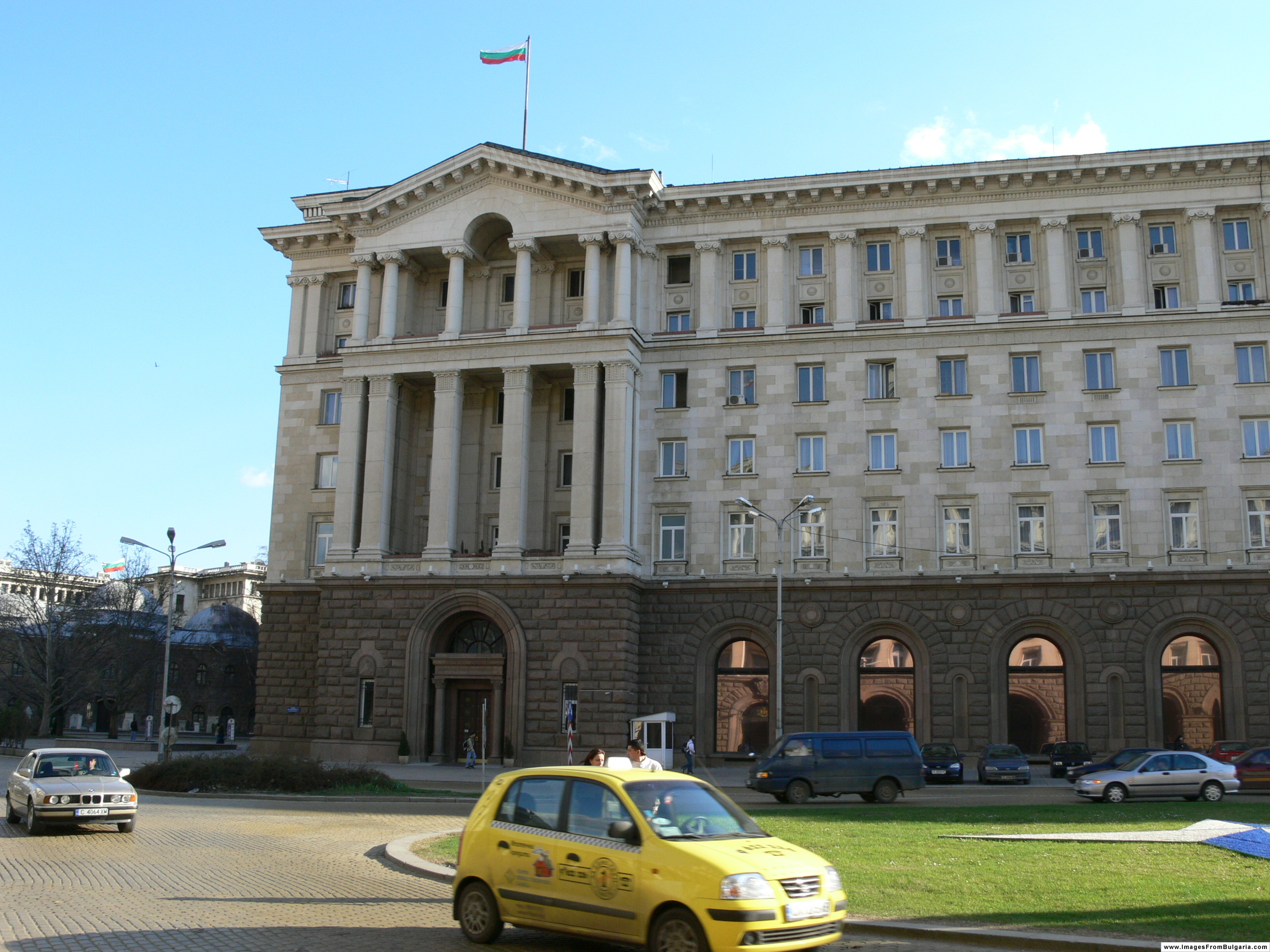
Presidential Administration

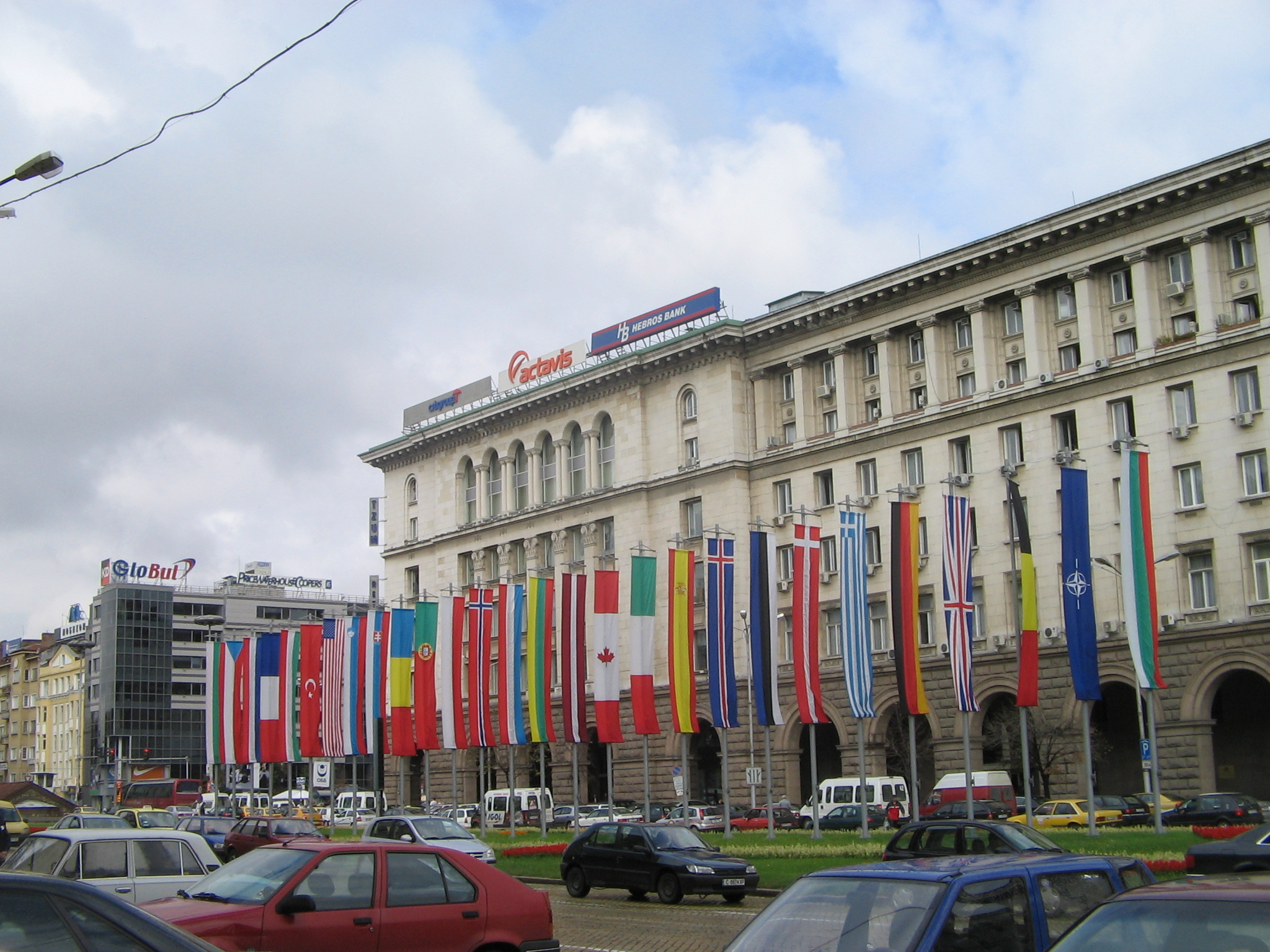
TZUM department store

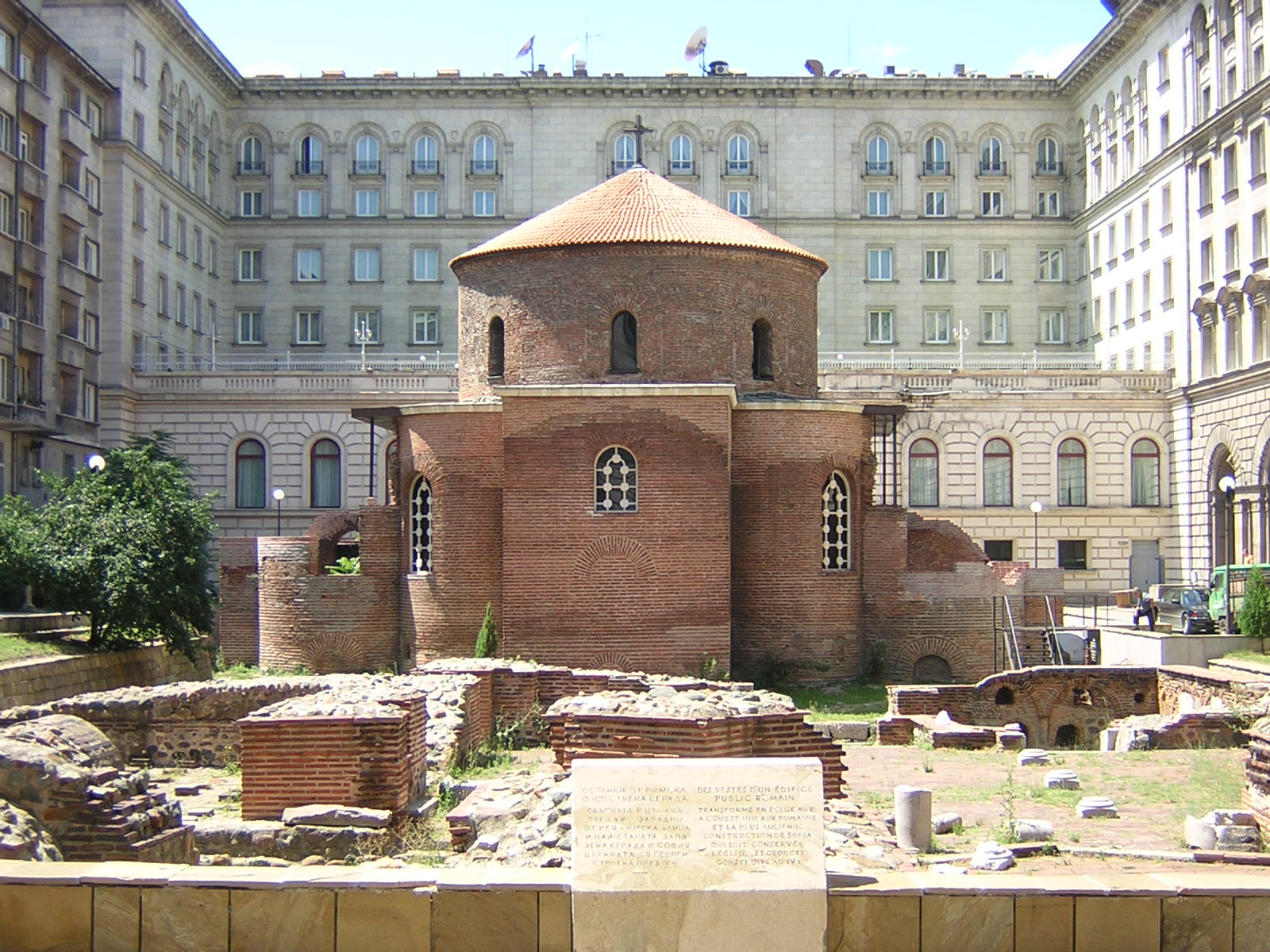
The 4th-century St George Rotunda behind the Balkan Hotel

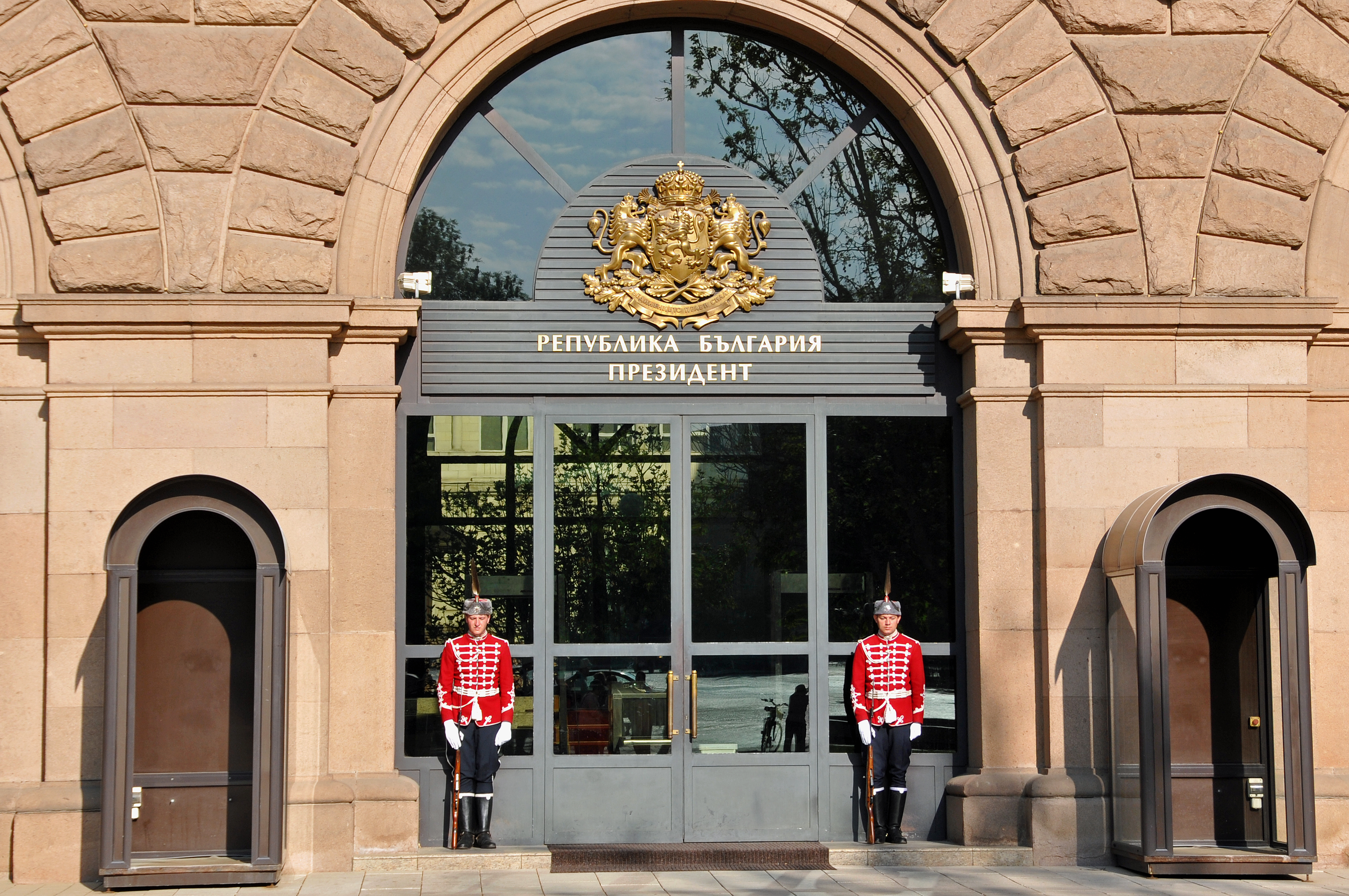
Presidential Guard
