= Tsar Osvoboditel Boulevard, Sofia =

Roadway in Sofia, Bulgaria

Tsar Osvoboditel Boulevard
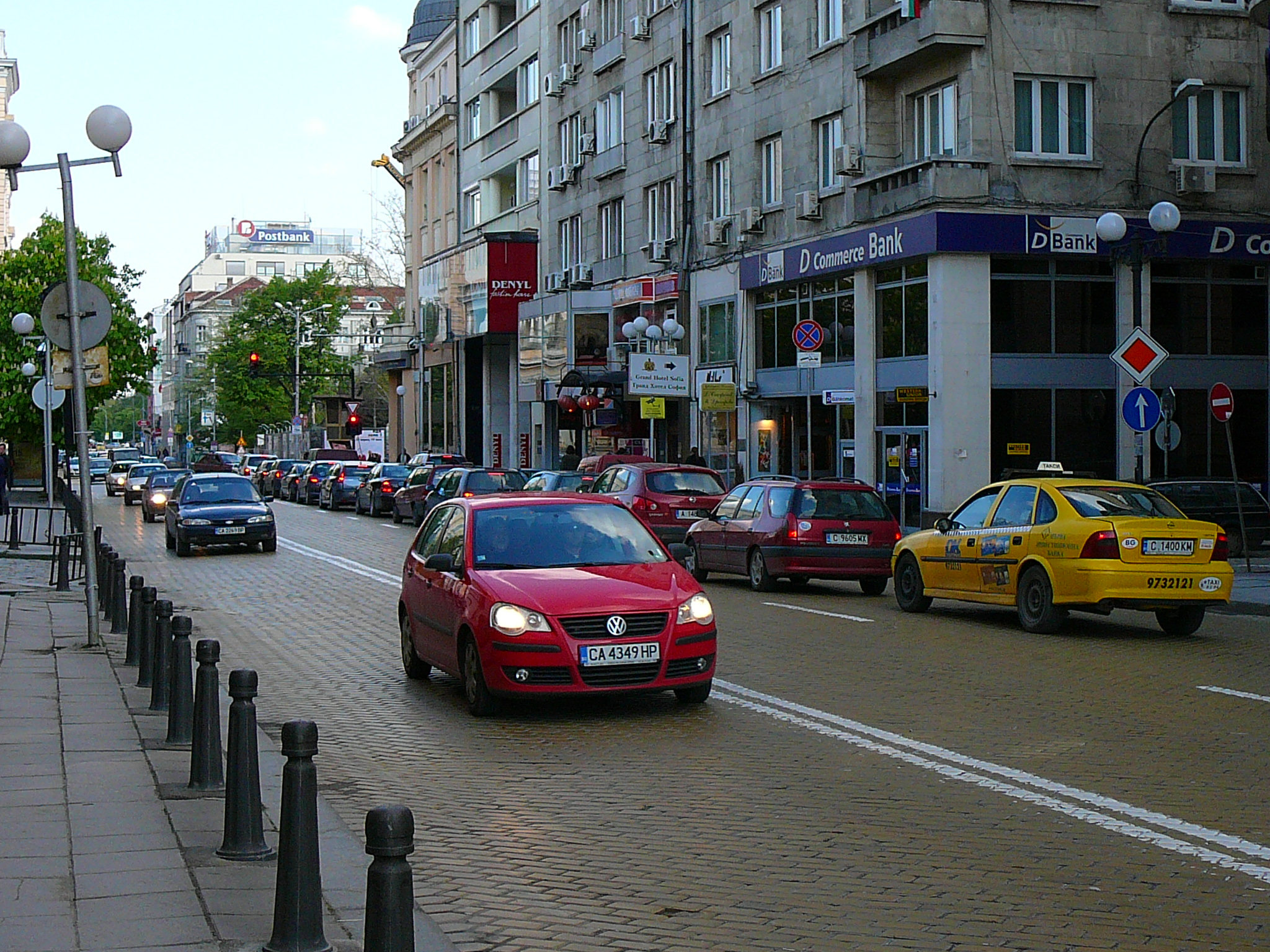
- View of the boulevard in 2009
- Interactive map of Tsar Osvoboditel Boulevard
- Native name: Булевард Цар Освободител (Bulgarian)
- Area: Sofia City Center
- Location: Sofia, Bulgaria
- Northwest end: Independence Square
- Southeast end: Eagles' Bridge

Tsar Osvoboditel Boulevard (Bulgarian: булевард „Цар Освободител“; "Tsar Liberator boulevard") is a boulevard in the centre of Sofia, the capital of Bulgaria. It lies between Orlov most to the east (east of which it is called Tsarigrad Road) and Nezavisimost Square to the west, where it merges with Knyaz Aleksandar Dondukov Boulevard to form Todor Aleksandrov Boulevard west of the square. It is named after the Russian Tsar Alexander II of Russia because of his role in the Liberation of Bulgaria.

Many of Sofia and Bulgaria's institutions and representative buildings are located on Tsar Osvoboditel Boulevard, including (from east to west) the Sofia University rectorate, the National Assembly of Bulgaria, the Bulgarian Academy of Sciences edifice, the Central Military Club, the former royal palace (today accommodating the National Art Gallery and the National Ethnographic Museum), the Bulgarian National Bank, the Italian Embassy and the Austrian Embassy.

From Orlov most to the Sofia University junction the boulevard is asphalt-paved, but it is mainly famous for the yellow Viennese cobblestones it features in its central, most representative part.

The boulevard intersects with (from east to west) Vasil Levski Boulevard at Sofia University where the SU St. Kliment Ohridski Metro Station is located, Georgi Sava Rakovski Street (at the Military Club) and Knyaz Alexander Battenberg Street (at Battenberg Square).

== Gallery ==
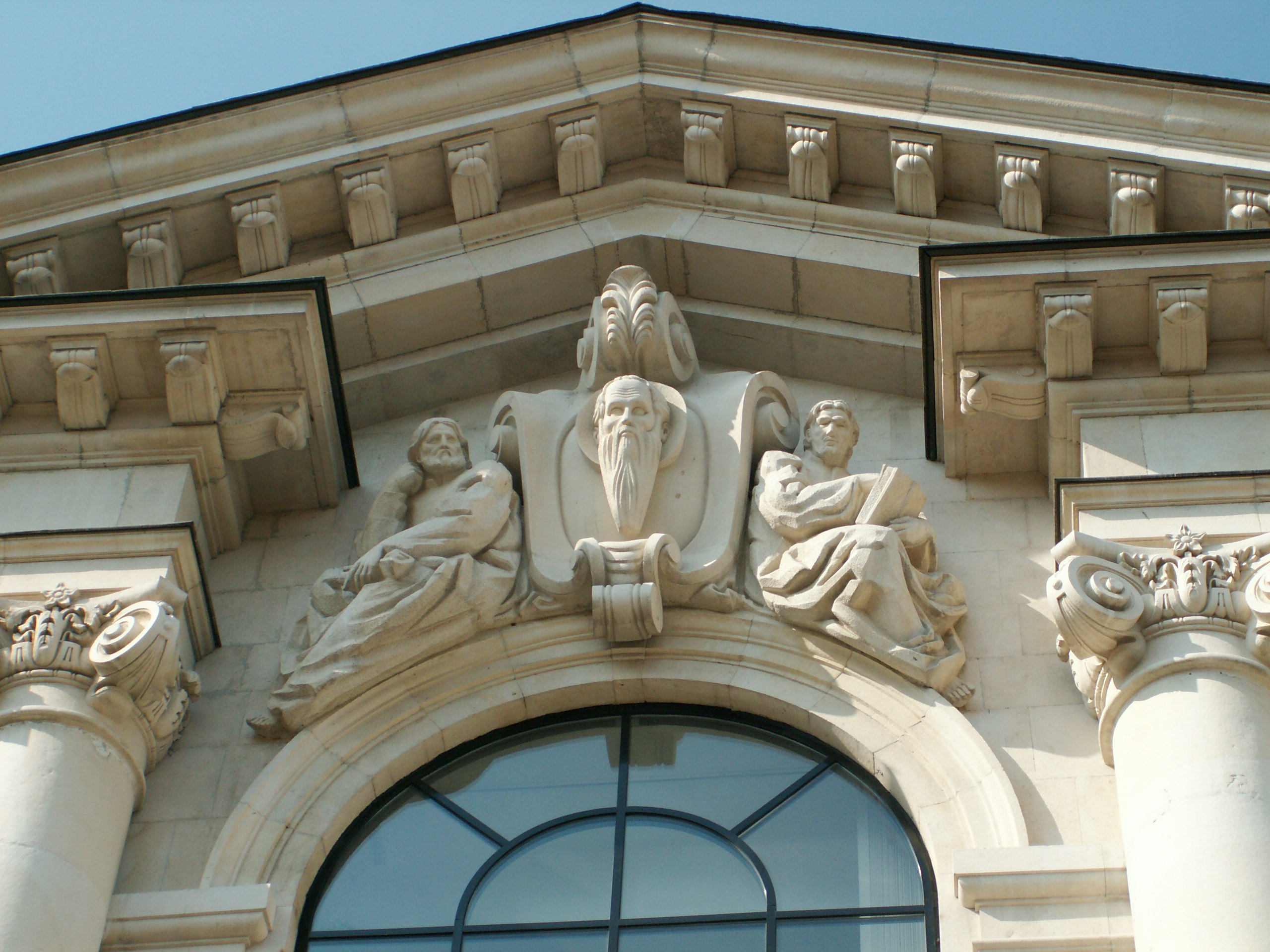
Sofia University rectorate

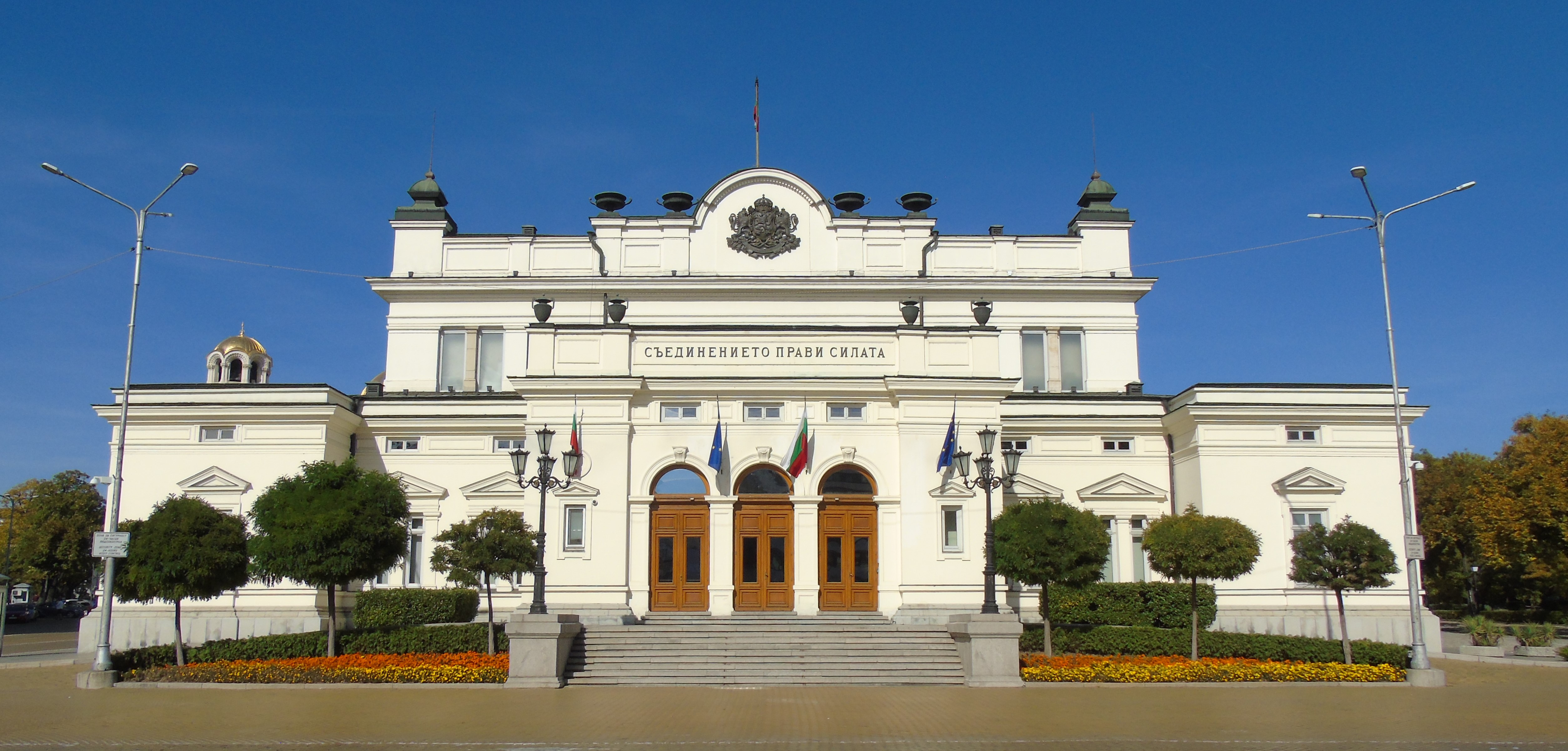
National Assembly of Bulgaria

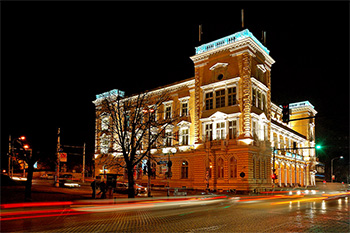
Central Military Club

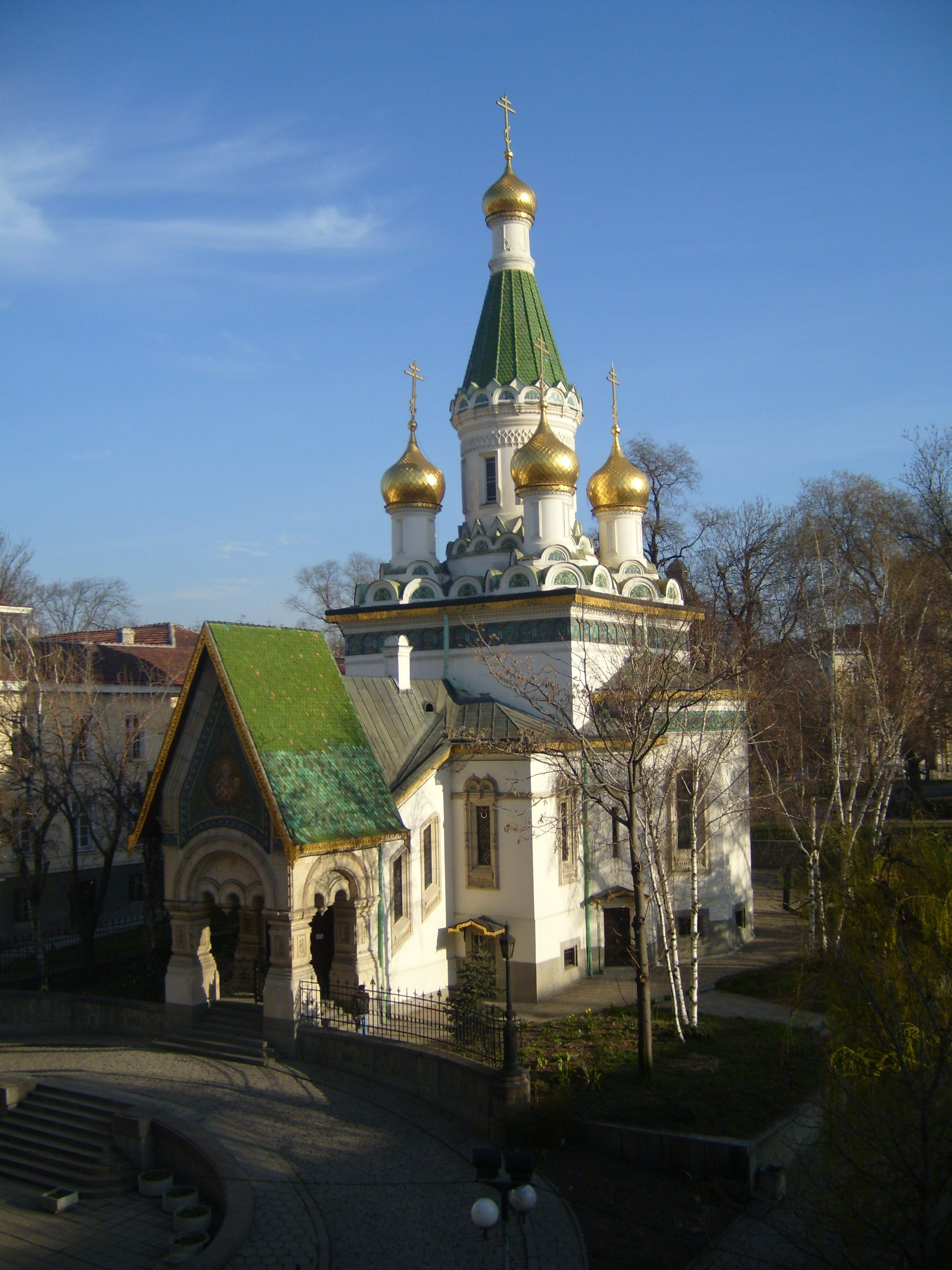
The Russian Church

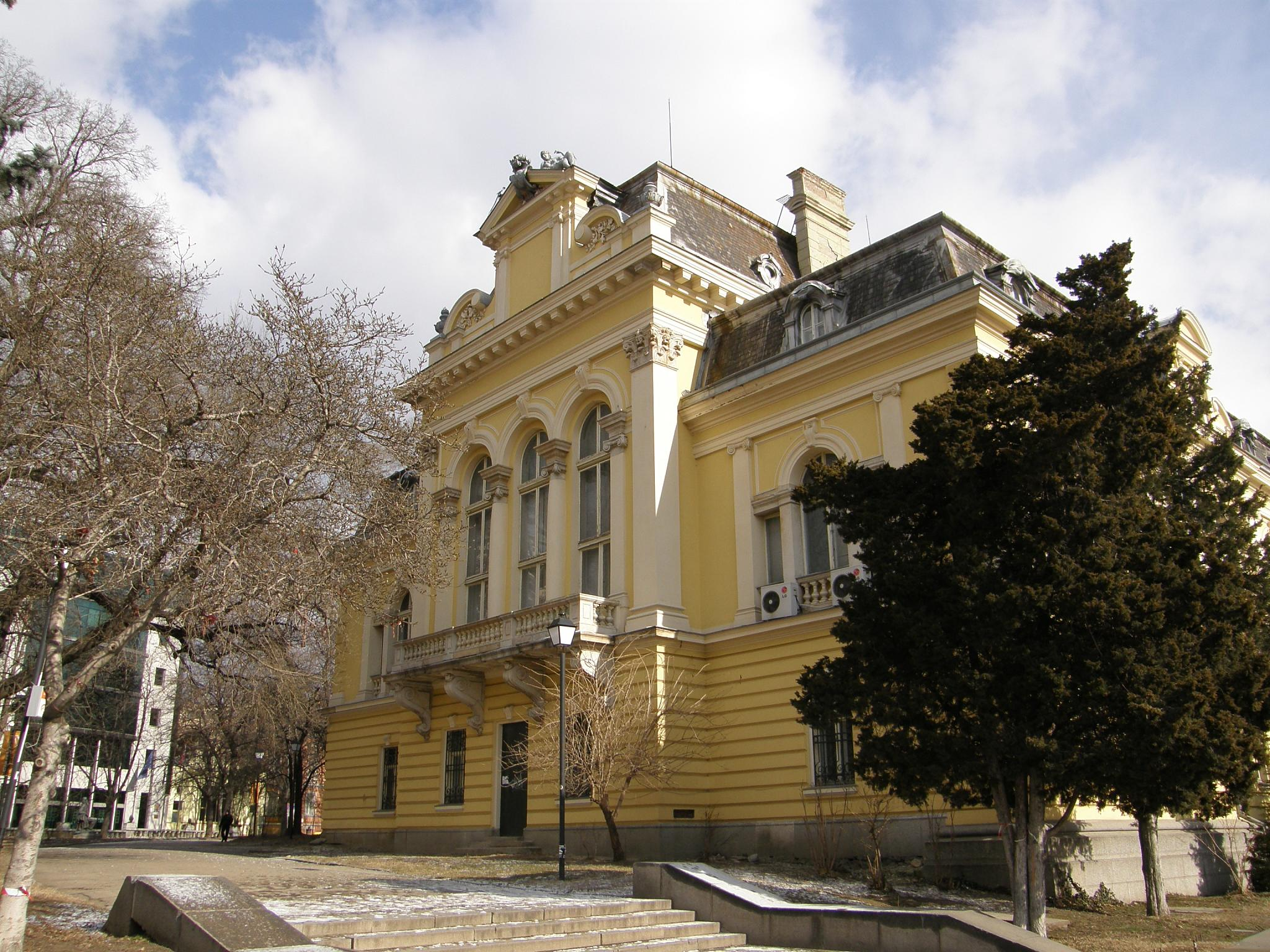
National Art Gallery (former royal palace)

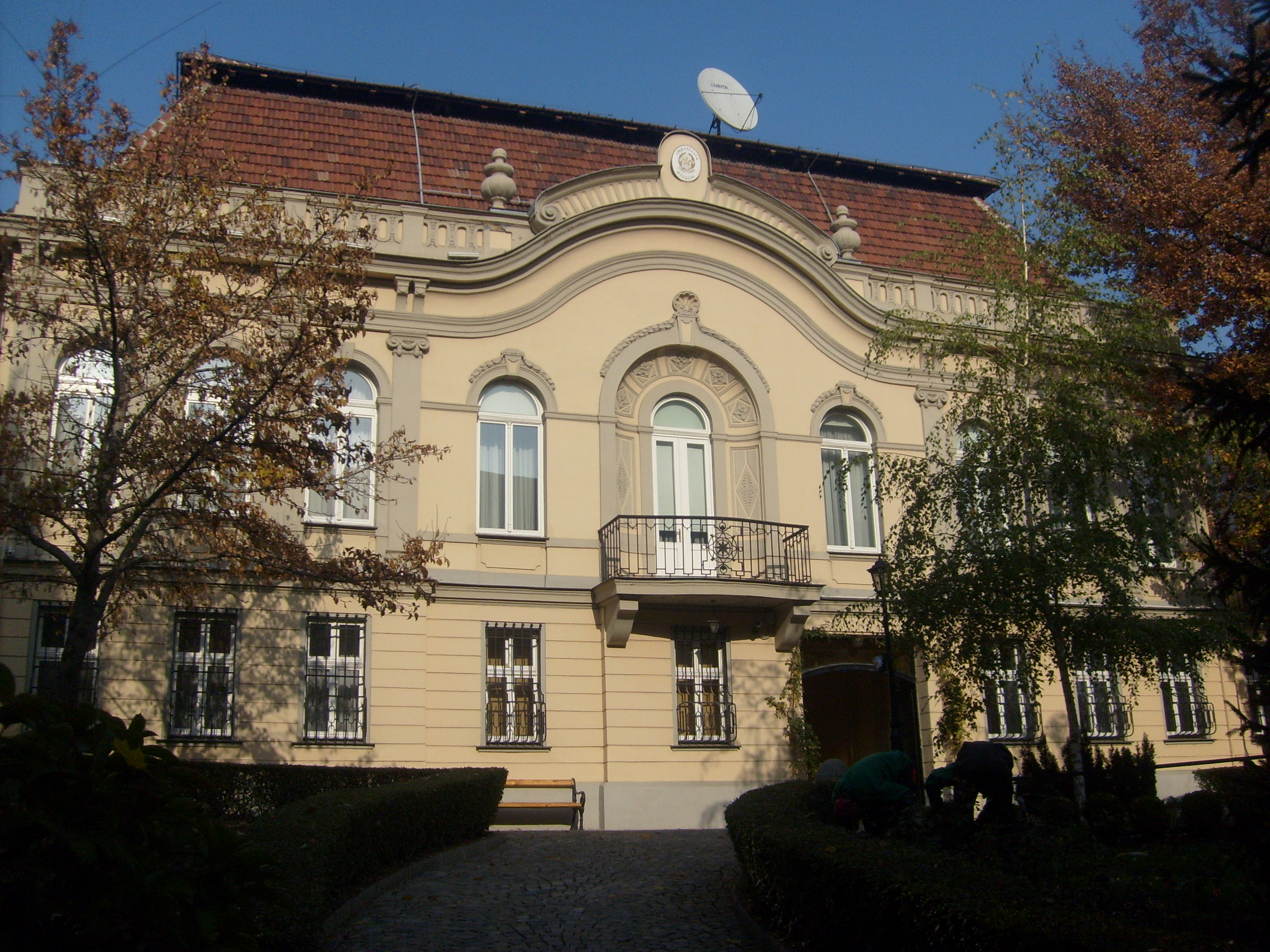
The Italian Embassy
