= Dondukov =

Asian House of nobility in Russia

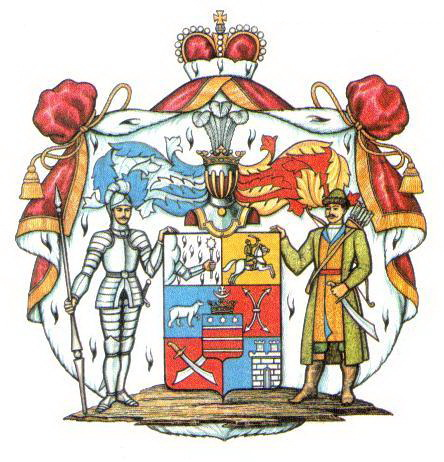
Princely arms of the family

The House of Dondukov is a Russian princely family descending from Donduk-Ombo, the sixth khan of the Kalmucks (reigned 1737–41). In 1732 he led 11,000 Kalmuck households from the Volga banks to the border of the Ottoman Empire at the Kuban River, asking the sultan for protection. The new settlement, however, was ill-suited for grazing animals, so he petitioned Anna of Russia to return to the Volga as soon as the Russo-Turkish War, 1735-1739 erupted.

After Donduk's death, the power in Kalmykia was usurped by his cousin. Donduk's widow, ethnically Circassian, converted to Russian Orthodoxy and went to Moscow in order to ask Empress Elizabeth for protection. In 1745 her children were baptised and authorized to bear the name of Princes Dondukov. Of these children, the elder, Prince Aleksey Dondukov, was sent by Catherine the Great to govern Kalmykia and reigned as a puppet khan from 1762 until his death 19 years later. His younger brother, Iona, lived in the Russian manor of his wife, Maria Korsakova. Instead of succeeding his brother as a khan, he was persuaded to exchange his ephemeral sovereignty for 3,000 souls of peasants living in Belarus.

Prince Iona Dondukov had one daughter only, who became upon his death one of the most coveted brides in Russia. In 1801, she was married by her mother to a relative, Colonel Nikita Ivanovich Korsakov (1776-1857), who was authorized to take the title of Prince Dondukov-Korsakov. They had only one daughter, Maria, married to another relative, Mikhail Aleksandrovich Korsakov (1794-1869), who succeeded his father-in-law as Prince Dondukov-Korsakov. Although he long remained Vice-President of the Russian Academy of Sciences, Mikhail Dondukov-Korsakov is best remembered by virtue of Pushkin's scurrilous epigram ridiculing his homosexual relationship with Count Uvarov.

His only son was Prince Alexander Mikhailovich Dondukov-Korsakov (1820–93) who rose to prominence fighting in the Caucasian War and in the Crimean campaign. In 1869 he was appointed Governor of Kiev, Podolia, and Volhynia. Having been promoted full General of Cavalry, he took a conspicuous part in the final Russo-Turkish war, remaining as the head of Russian administration in Bulgaria after the war ended and helping pen the Tarnovo Constitution, the first Bulgarian constitution. He ended his long and illustrious career as the Governor of the Caucasus in 1882 - 1890.

== See also ==
- Knyaz Aleksandar Dondukov Boulevard
