= Central Military Club =

Building in Sofia, Bulgaria

Coordinates: 42°41′43″N 23°19′47″E

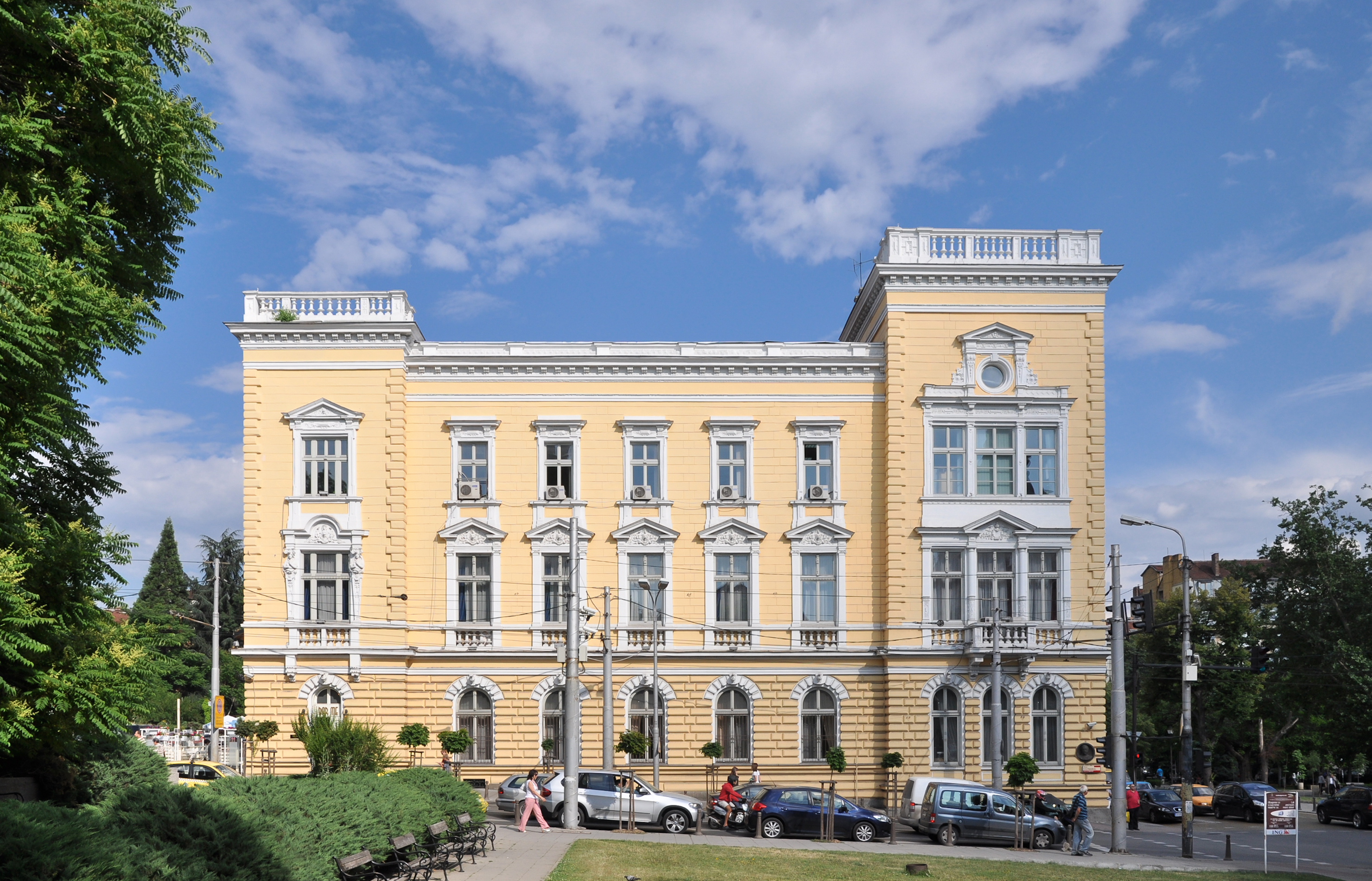
The Central Military Club

The Central Military Club (Bulgarian: Централен военен клуб, Tsentralen voenen klub) is a multi-purpose monument of culture building in the centre of Sofia, the capital of Bulgaria, located on Tsar Osvoboditel Boulevard and Georgi Rakovski Street. It serves the Bulgarian Army and is administered by the Executive Agency of Military Clubs and Information. The 2010 world chess championship match between Viswanathan Anand of India and Vesselin Topalov of Bulgaria was held in this building that was won by Viswanathan Anand.

The foundation stone of the edifice was laid in 1895. The Military Club was designed by Czech architect Antonín Kolář in the Neo-Renaissance style and finished by Bulgarian architect Nikola Lazarov in 1907. The lot and the funding was provided by the Sofia Officers' Assembly. A stone from the battlefield at Slivnitsa from the Serbo-Bulgarian War (1885-1886) was laid in the foundations.

The building has three stories and features a coffeehouse, an art gallery, a number of refined halls varying in size, as well as an imposing concert hall with 450 seats. Due to all this, the Central Military Club has always been an important cultural centre of the capital, once exhibiting works by Ivan Mrkvička, Vladimir Dimitrov, Jaroslav Věšín and providing these noted artists with studios. The concert hall has also seen performances by actors and opera singers like Krastyu Sarafov, Nicolai Ghiaurov, Feodor Chaliapin, Boris Christoff, and bands like Ladytron etc.

== Gallery ==
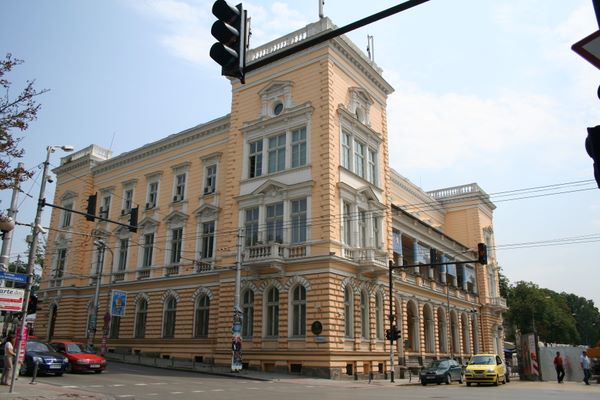
View

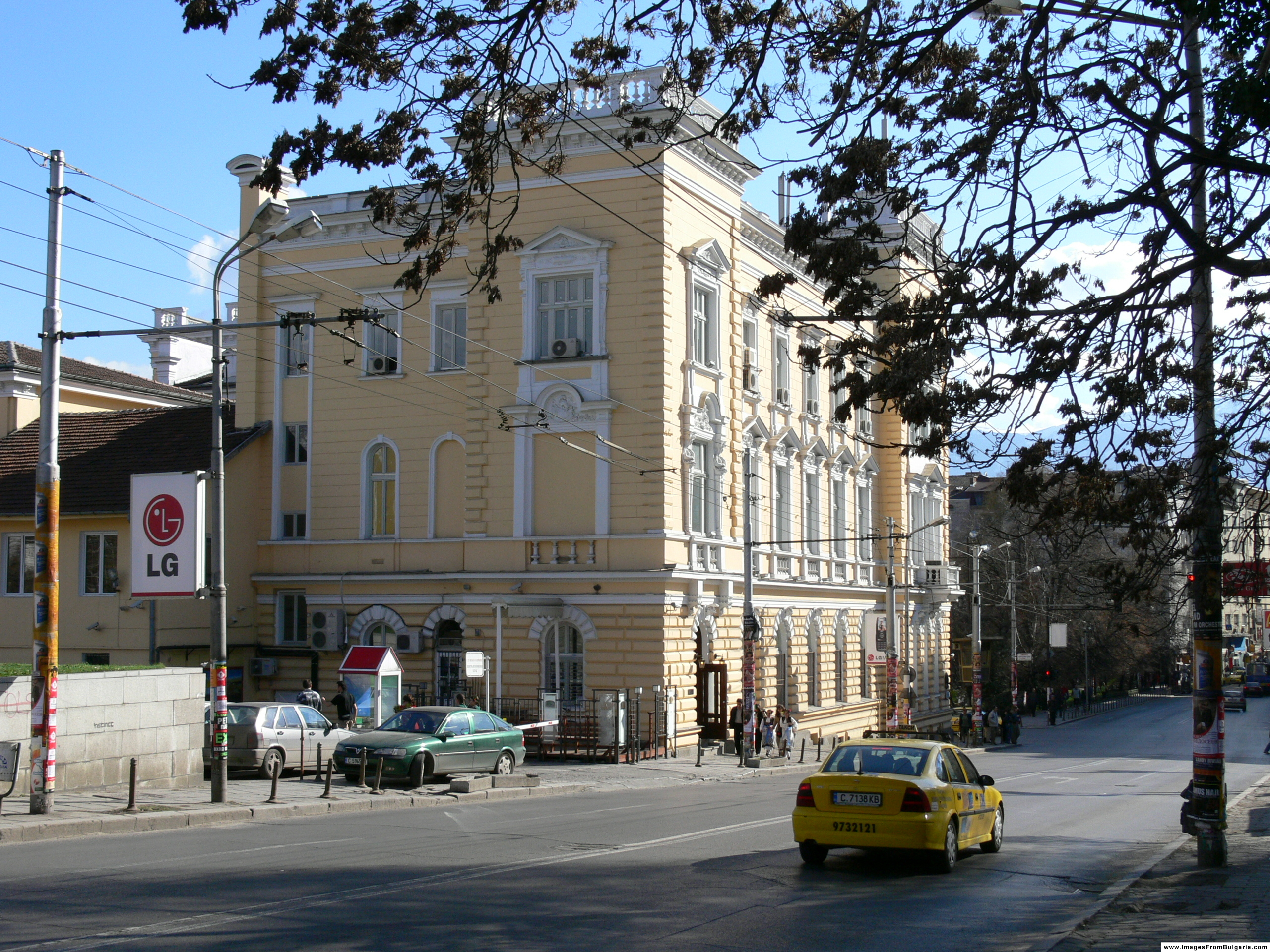
Another view

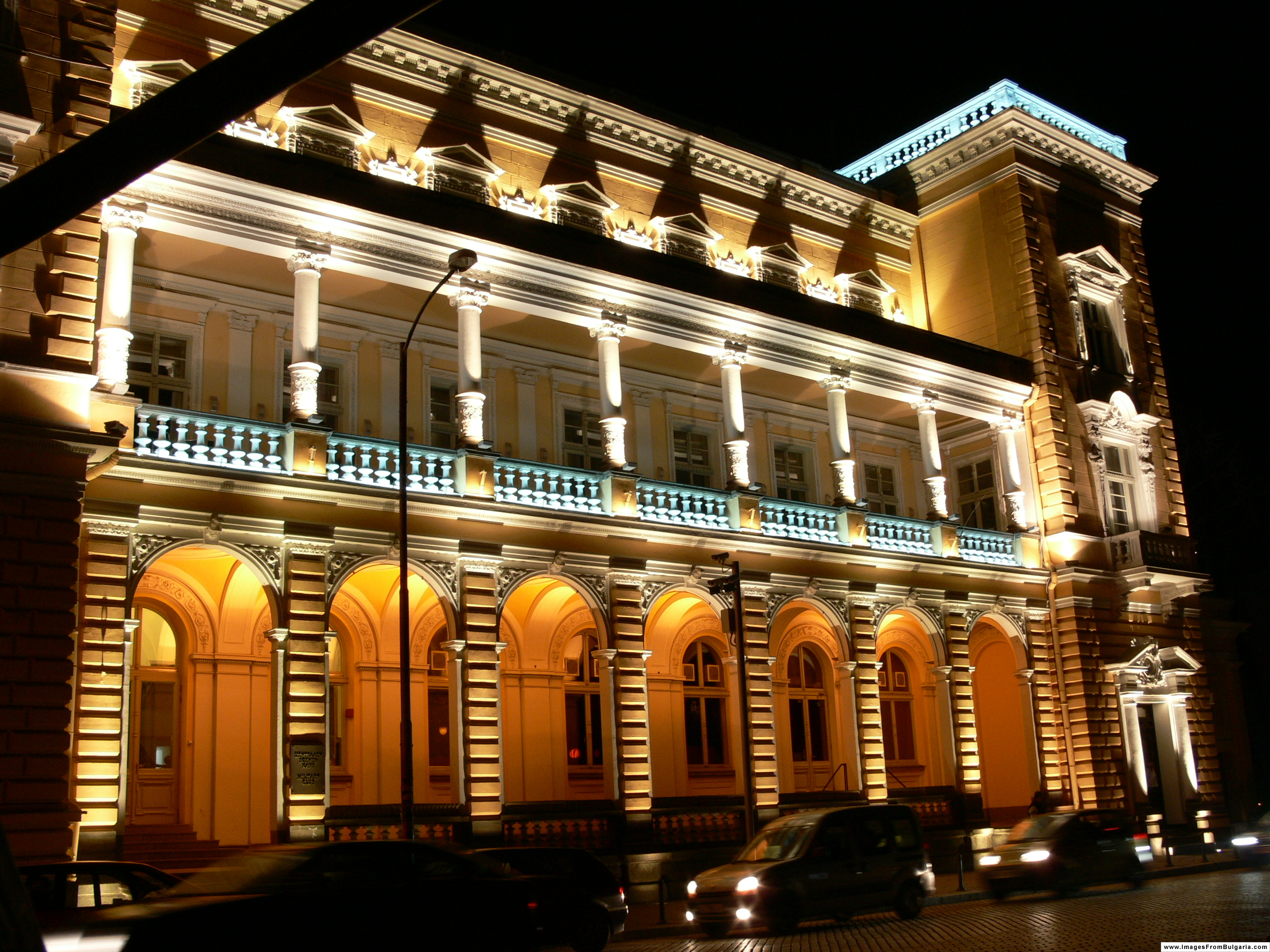
Night view

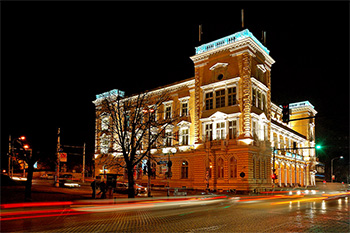
Night view

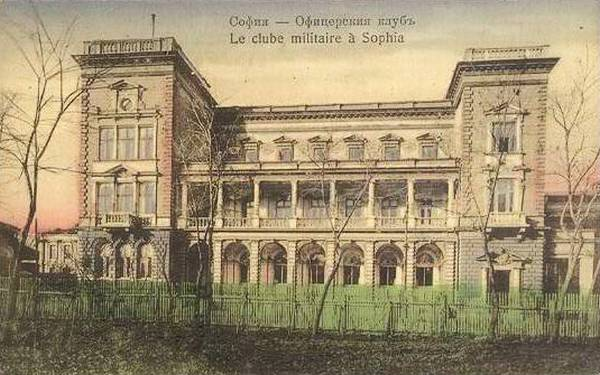
Old photo

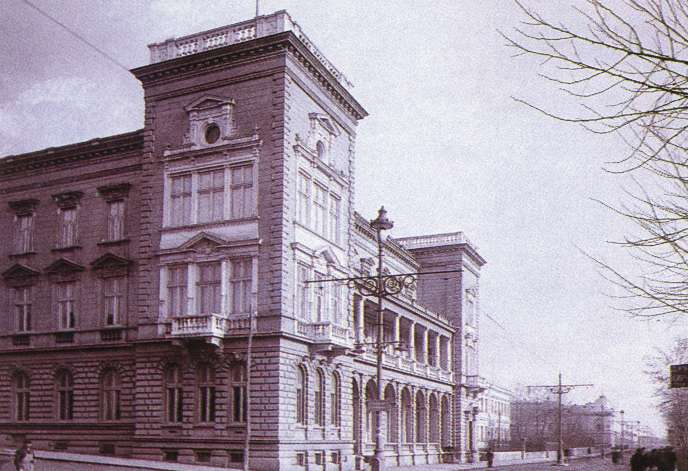
Old photo
