= Serdika II Metro Station =

Sofia metro station

Serdika II Сердика II
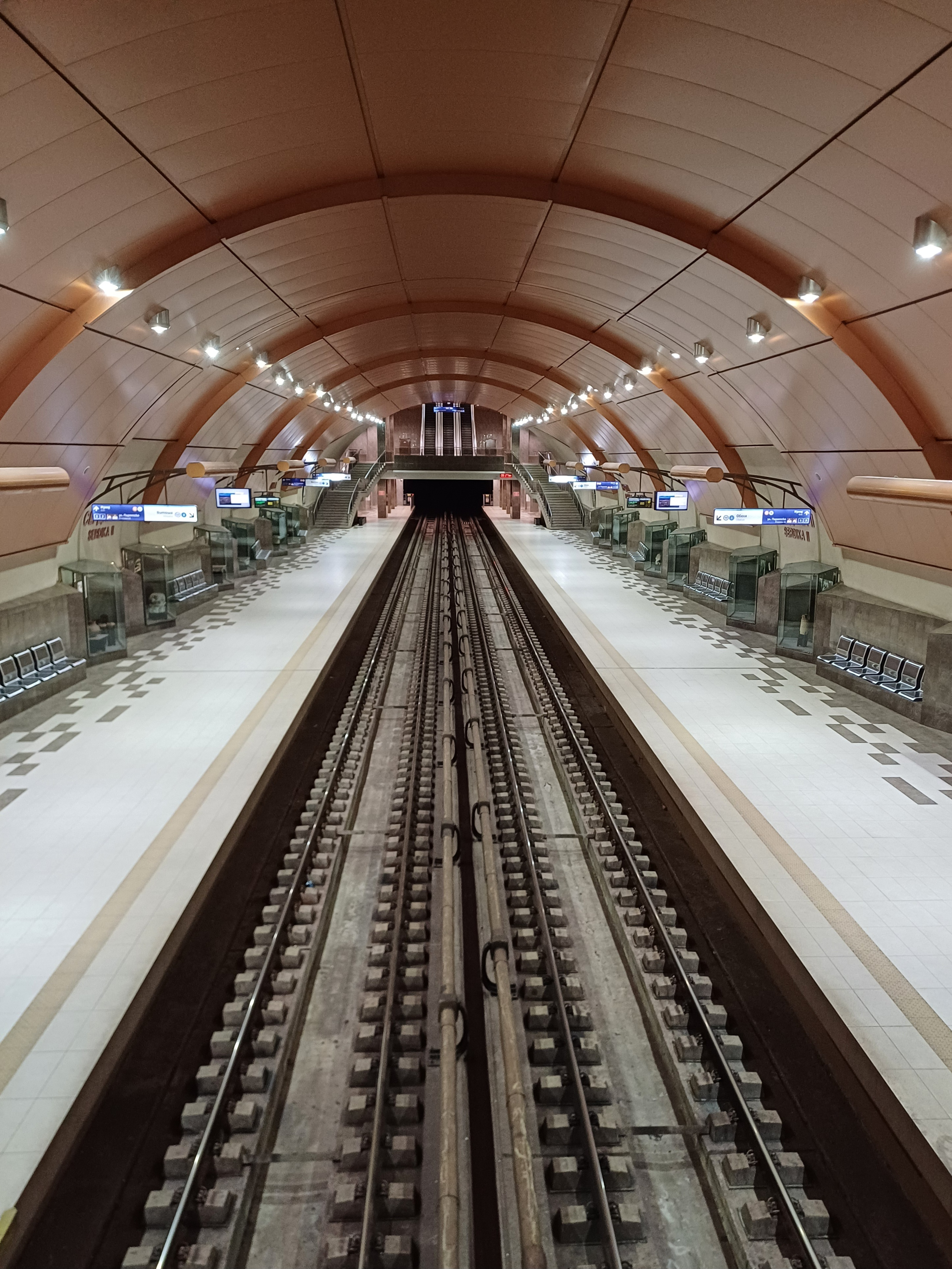
- Serdika II platform, 3 June 2024

General information
- Location: 1000 Sofia center, Sofia
- Coordinates: 42°41′55.36″N 23°19′19.31″E
- Owner: Sofia Municipality
- Operator: Metropoliten JSC
- Platforms: side
- Tracks: 2
- Bus routes: 4
- Connections
- Tram: 4, 12, 18, 20, 21, 22
- Metro: 1 4 via Serdika Metro Station
- Bus: N1, N2, N3, N4

Construction
- Structure type: sub-surface
- Depth: 24 m (79 ft)
- Platform levels: 3
- Parking: no
- Cycle facilities: yes
- Accessible: none
- Architect: Krasen Andreev

Other information
- Status: Staffed
- Station code: 2993; 2994
- Website: Official website

History
- Opened: 31 August 2012

Passengers
- 2020: 630,000

Services
Preceding station	Sofia Metro	Following station
NDK towards Vitosha	M2 line	Lavov most towards Obelya
Location

Serdika II Metro Station (Bulgarian: Метростанция „Сердика II“) is an M2 line station of Sofia Metro. It was put into operation on August 31, 2012 and the station became transfer station between the Red and Blue lines together with Serdika, however it is not a true transfer station (that role is filled by Obelya), but a tunnel-connection transfer station. Bulgaria's PM Boyko Borisov and the President of the European Commission Jose Manuel Barroso inaugurated the new section of the Sofia Metro, which was funded with EU money. The initial project name of the Metro Station was Sveta Nedelya Square, but this was changed by the city council shortly before the opening of M2 line.

== Public Transportation ==
- Bus service: N1, N3, N4
- Tramway service: 4, 12, 18, 20, 21, 22

== Location ==
The station is located in the heart of the city beneath the Largo complex. It is named after the ancient city of Serdica, as it lies in the very centre of the hitherto unearthed ruins of that city. These are located about 20 feet (6.1 m) below ground and a large section of the old city has been exposed and is in full view both around and inside the two stations, especially Serdika II.

== Gallery ==
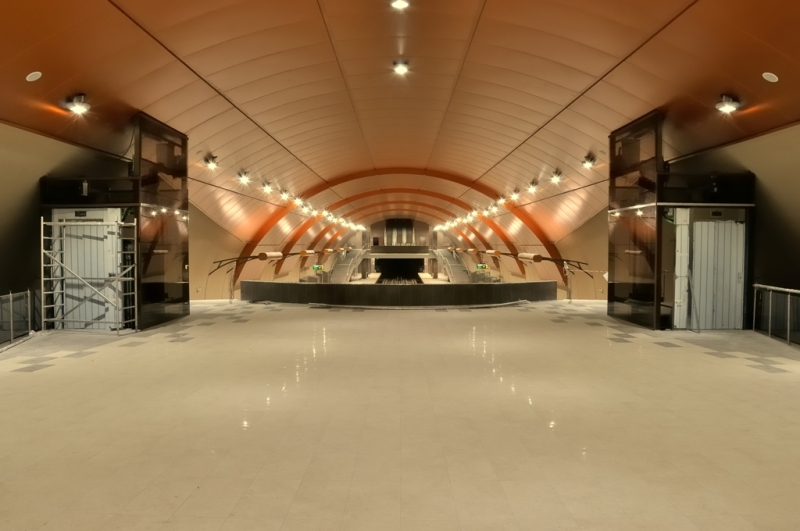

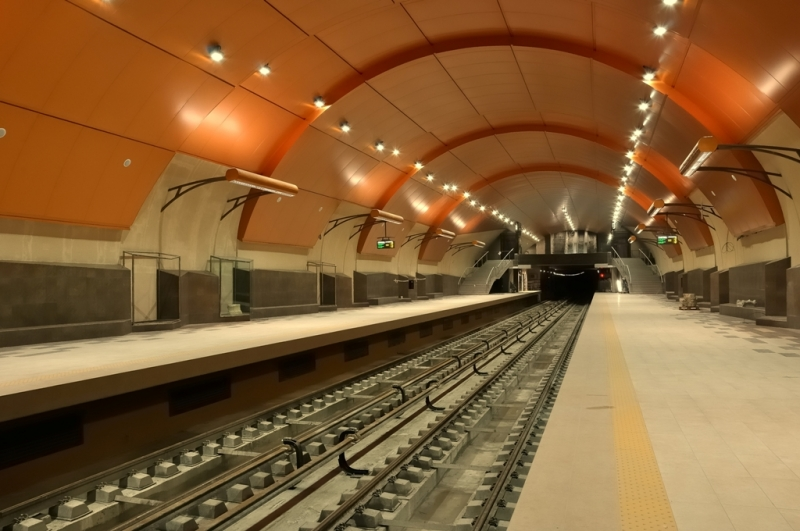

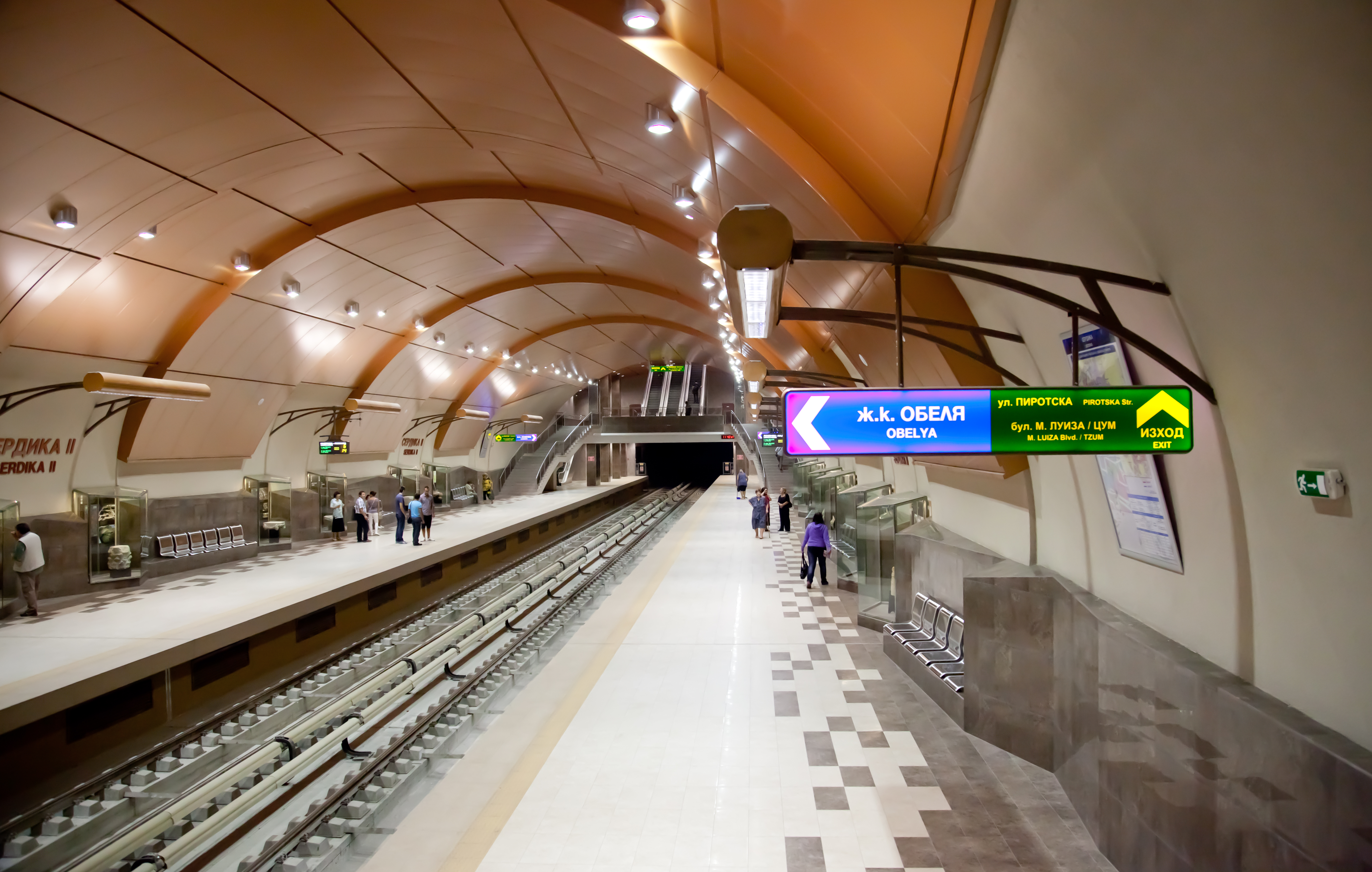
