= Georgi Rakovski Street =

Street in Sofia, Bulgaria

Georgi S. Rakovski Street
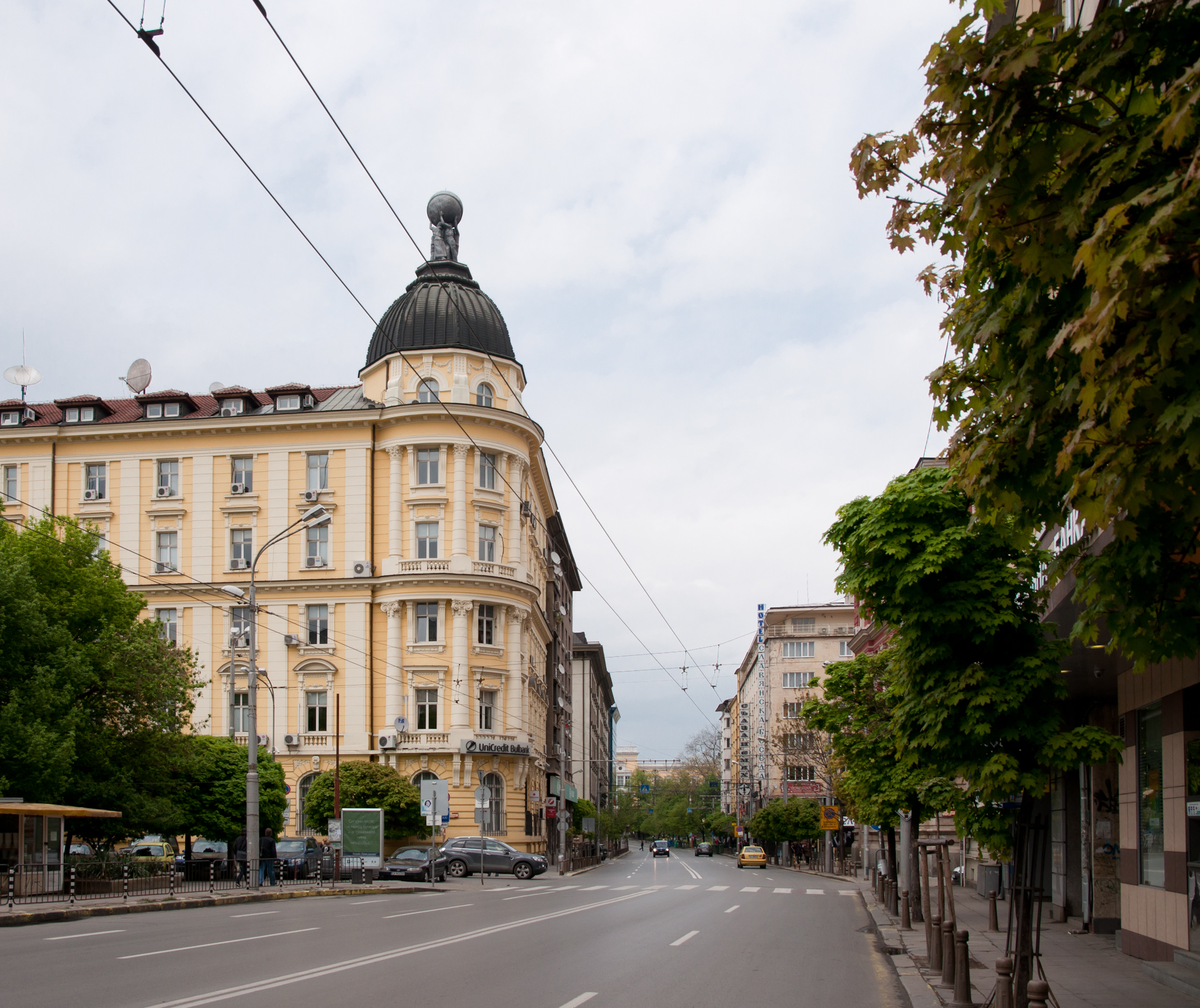
- Central part of Rakovski street
- Interactive map of Georgi S. Rakovski Street
- Native name: Улица Георги С. Раковски (Bulgarian)
- Location: Sofia, Bulgaria
- Coordinates: 42°41′36.29″N 23°19′40.14″E
- From: Kozloduy Street 42.707639°N 23.328137°E
- Major junctions: Slaveykov Square, Central Military Club, Alexander Nevsky Square
- To: Evlogi Georgiev Boulevard 42.684273°N 23.323614°E

Other
- Known for: Theaters, Retail, Banks, Ministries, Landmarks

Georgi Rakovski Street (Bulgarian: Улица Георги Раковски, Ulitsa Georgi Rakovski), usually referred to by its old name of Rakovska, is a major street in Sofia, the capital of Bulgaria. Located in the center of the city between Slivnitsa Boulevard and Evlogi Georgiev Boulevard, it is named after the Bulgarian revolutionary Georgi Sava Rakovski.

The street passes along some of Sofia's major landmarks, including the Alexander Nevsky Cathedral and the Central Military Club. A large number of theatre venues are located between Slaveykov Square and Knyaz Aleksandar Dondukov Boulevard, hence the street's nickname of "Theatre Street" or "The Bulgarian Broadway":

- Municipal Theatre Revival
- Aleko Konstantinov Satirical Theatre
- Funny Theatre
- Capital Puppet Theatre
- Ivan Vazov National Theatre
- Theatre 199
- Theatre Tear and Laugh
- Bulgarian Army Theatre
- National Opera and Ballet

There are several government ministries along the street or very close to it, such as the Ministry of Economics and the Ministry of Finance.

== Gallery ==
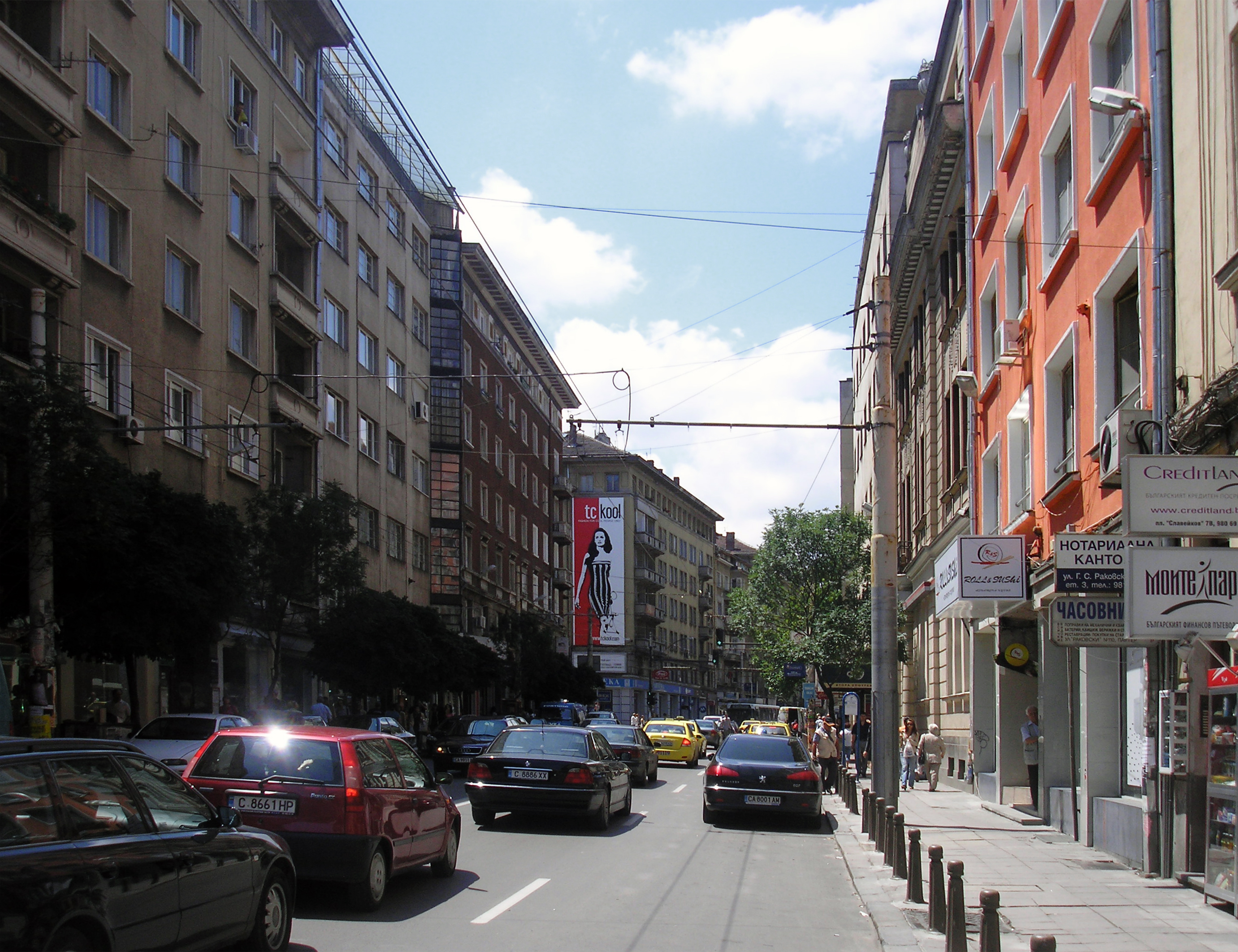

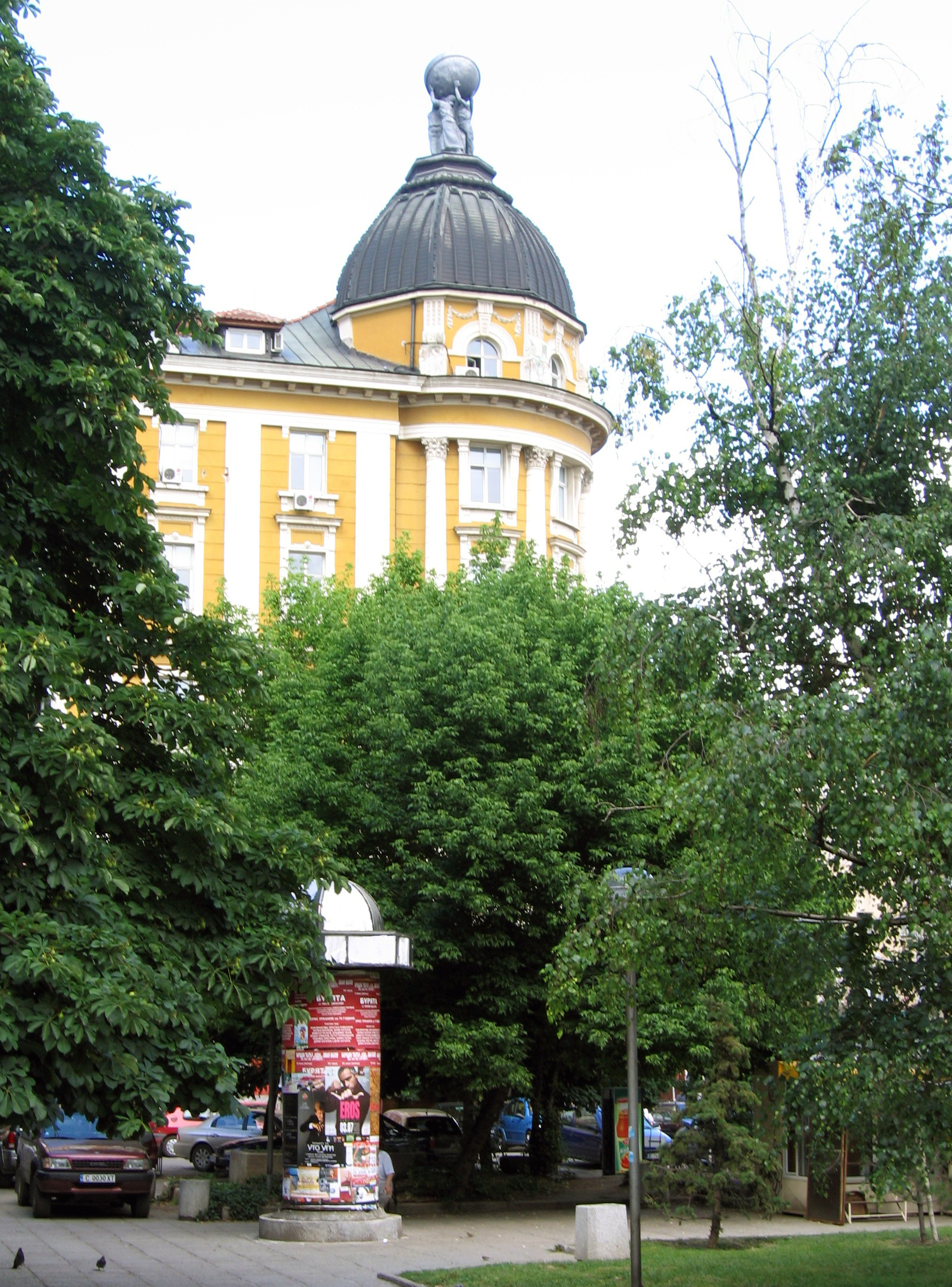

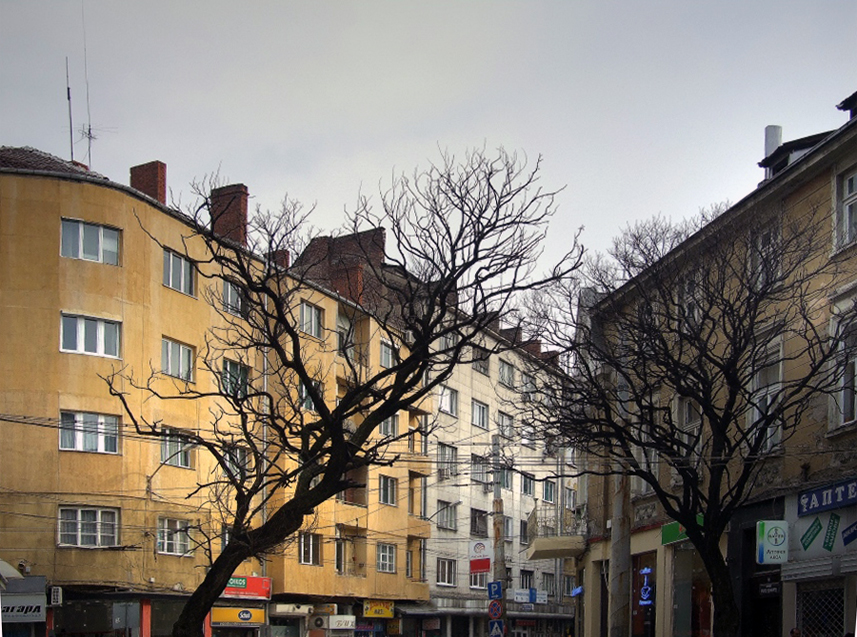

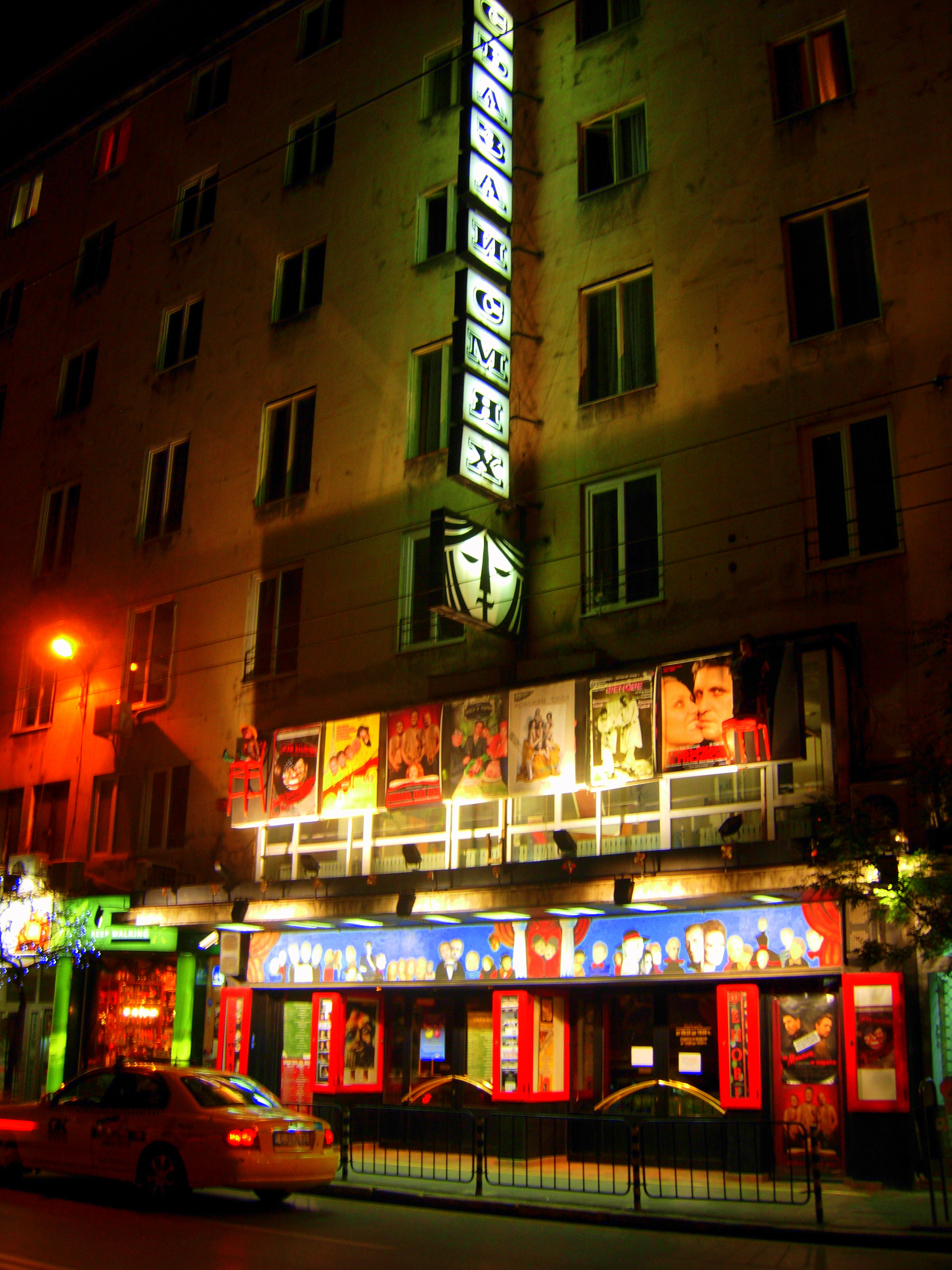
