= Serdika Metro Station =

Sofia metro station

Serdica Сердика
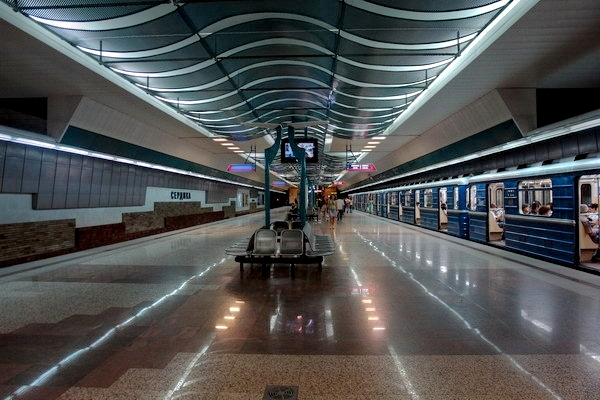

General information
- Location: 1000 Sofia Center, Sofia
- Coordinates: 42°41′52″N 23°19′17″E
- Owner: Sofia Municipality
- Operator: Metropoliten JSC
- Platforms: island
- Tracks: 2
- Bus routes: 4
- Connections
- Tram: 1, 5, 8, 12, 18, 27
- Metro: 2 via Serdika II Metro Station
- Bus: N1, N2, N3, N4

Construction
- Structure type: sub-surface
- Platform levels: 2
- Parking: yes
- Cycle facilities: no
- Accessible: an elevator to platforms
- Architect: Krasen Andreev

Other information
- Status: Staffed
- Station code: 3013; 3014
- Website: Official website

History
- Opened: 31 October 2000

Passengers
- 2020: 814,000

Services
Preceding station	Sofia Metro	Following station
Opalchenska towards Slivnitsa	M1 line	SU St. Kliment Ohridski towards Business Park Sofia
Opalchenska towards Slivnitsa	M4 line	SU St. Kliment Ohridski towards Sofia Airport
Location

Serdika Metro Station (Bulgarian: Метростанция „Сердика“) is an M1 and M4 lines station of Sofia Metro. It was put into operation on 31 October 2000. With the opening of Serdika II on 31 August 2012 the station became an interchange between the Red and Blue lines. However it is not a true interchange (such as platforms 3, 4, 5 and 6 of Canning Town station in London), but an interconnected station, in a similar manner to the Washington Metro’s Farragut West and Farragut North stations.

The station is named after the ancient city of Serdica, as it lies in the very centre of the hitherto unearthed ruins of that city. These are located about six meters (20 feet) below ground and, along with the opening of Serdika II station, a large section of the old city has been exposed and is in full view both around and inside the two stations.

From August 2012 to July 2025, Serdica was one of only three metro stations in the world where the same line passed through the station twice in a pretzel configuration, the others being the Monument Metro station on the Tyne and Wear Metro in Newcastle upon Tyne, England, and Voorweg RandstadRail station on the Randstadrail of The Hague, Netherlands.

== Interchange with other public transport ==
- Bus service: N1, N2, N3, N4
- Tramway service: 1, 5, 8, 12, 18, 27

== Gallery ==
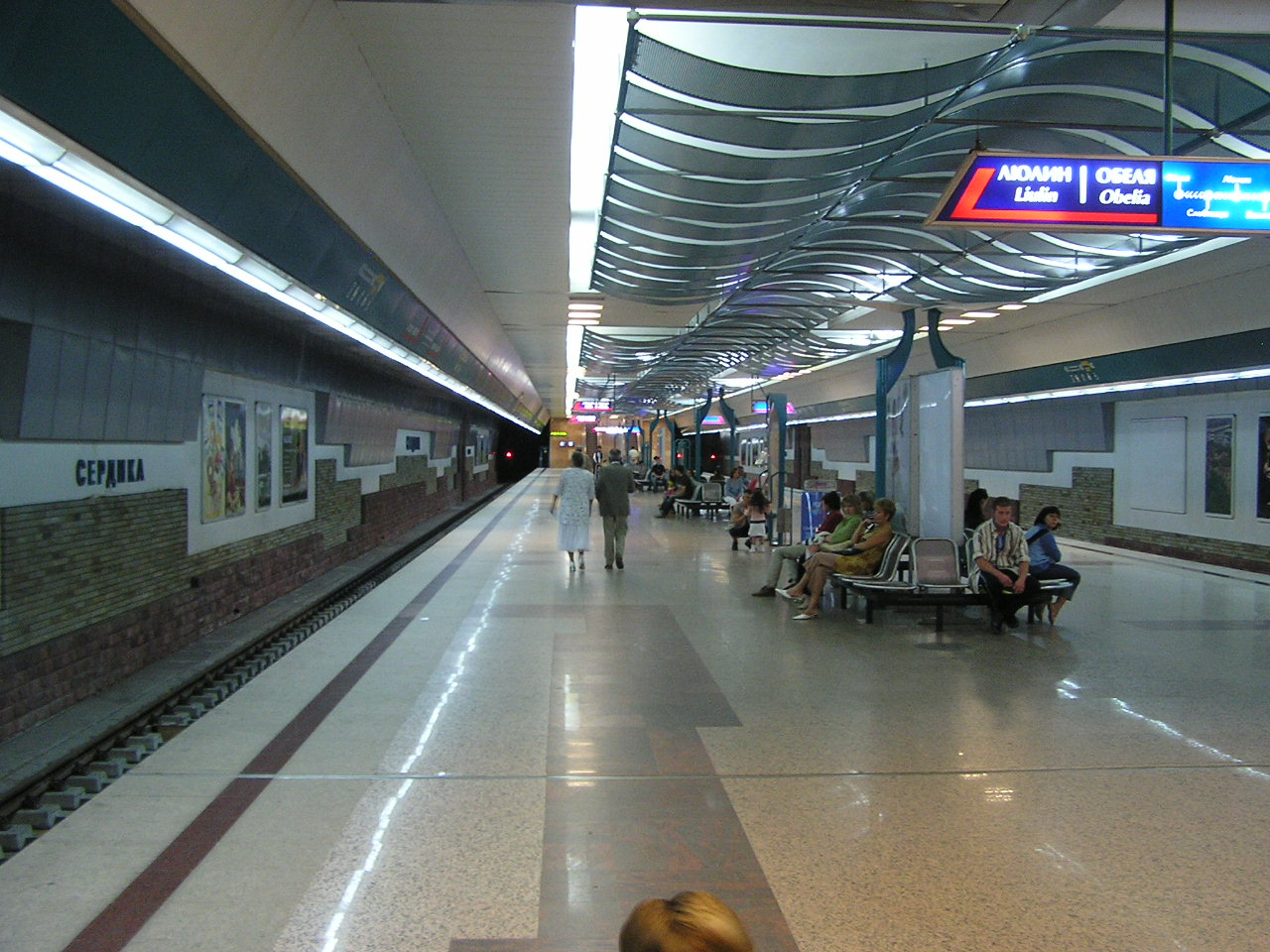

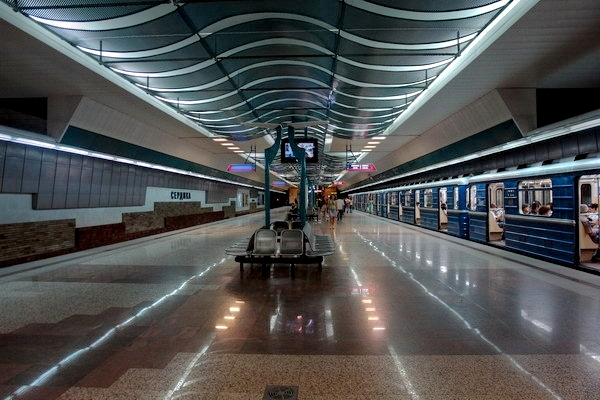
