= Knyaz Aleksandar Dondukov Boulevard =

Boulevard in Sofia, Bulgaria

Coordinates: 42°41′53.43″N 23°19′45.54″E

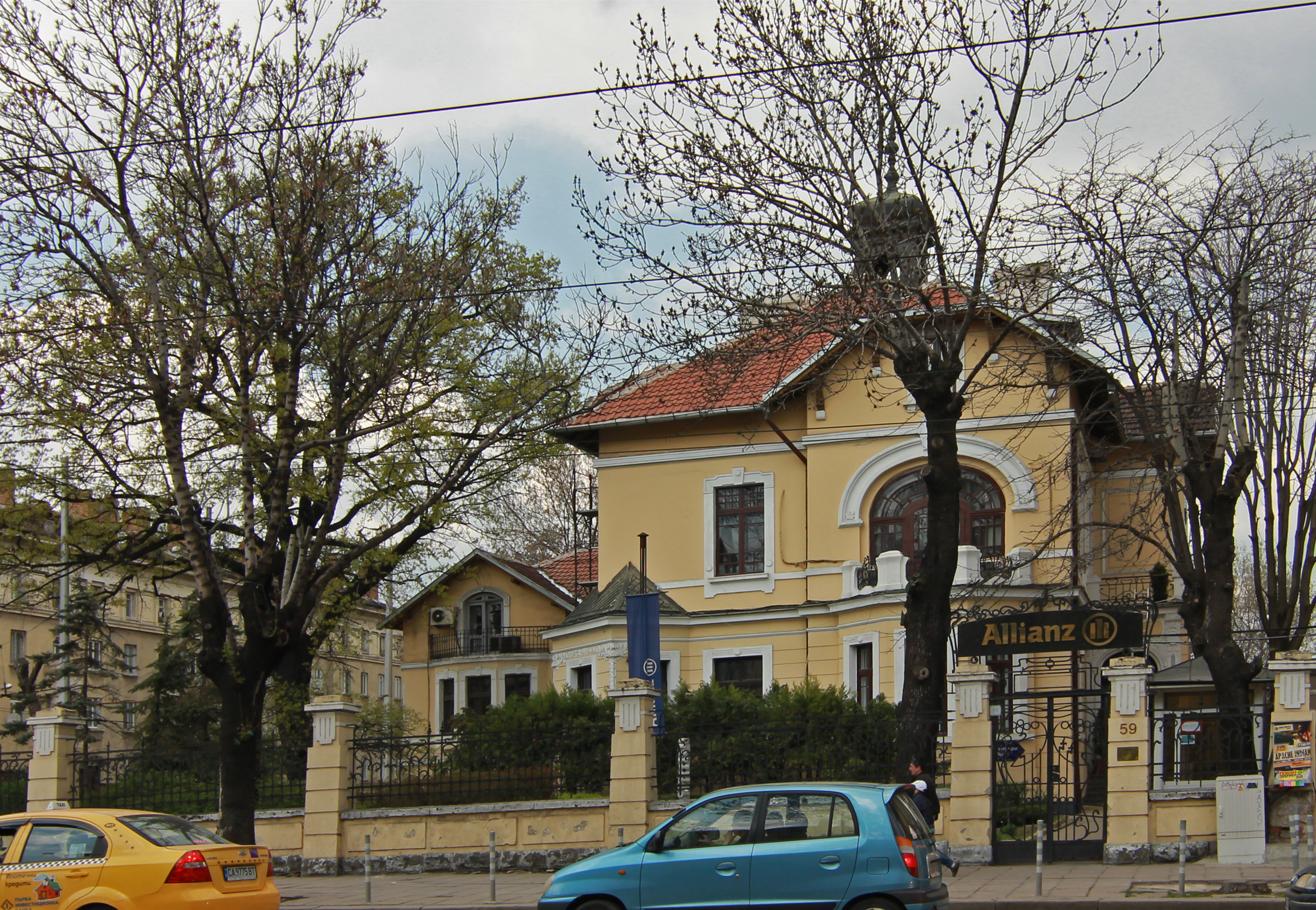
View of Aleksandar Dondukov Boulevard.

Knyaz Aleksandar Dondukov Boulevard (Bulgarian: Булевард Княз Александър Дондуков), shortly referred to as Dondukov, is an important central boulevard in Sofia. It is named after the Russian general and statesman Alexander Dondukov-Korsakov. It lies between the TZUM and the Chavdar bridge. It crosses several other major streets such as the Vasil Levski Boulevard and Georgi Rakovski Street.

== History ==
Before the Liberation of Bulgaria it was a small muddy street. It was given its current name in 1881. In 1901 one of the first tram lines in the city were constructed on the street. The boulevard became a market street with a number of shops. After the world wars the boulevard's appearance changed significantly. New buildings were constructed on the place of the old two-floor edifices and the number of shops increased dramatically.

== Sights ==
Northern side:

- TZUM
- Council of Ministers of Bulgaria (No.1)
- The house of Adolf Funk (No.59) - built in 1904, now headquarters of the Bulgarian Red Cross
- Zaimov Park

Southern side

- Presidency (No.2)
- Former Party house - now offices for the deputies.
- Youth Theatre Nikolay Binev
- National Opera
