= Maria Luiza =

Maria Luiza may refer to:

== People ==
- Maria Luiza Albuquerque (born 2011), Brazilian rhythmic gymnast
- Maria Luiza Beatris de Menezes Bragança (1916–1983), Indian freedom fighter and research scientist, first dean of Tata Memorial Hospital
- Maria Luísa Mendonça (born 1970), Brazilian actress
- Maria Luiza Petzl-Erler, Brazilian biologist and immunologist
- Maria Luiza Ribeiro Viotti (born 1954), Brazilian diplomat and Ambassador of Brazil to the United States

== Other uses ==
- Maria Luiza Boulevard, a central boulevard in Sofia, Bulgaria
  - Knyaginya Maria Luiza Metro Station

== See also ==
- Maria Luisa
- Mary Louise (disambiguation)
