= Knyaginya Maria Luiza Metro Station =

Sofia metro station

Knyaginya Maria Luiza Княгиня Мария Луиза
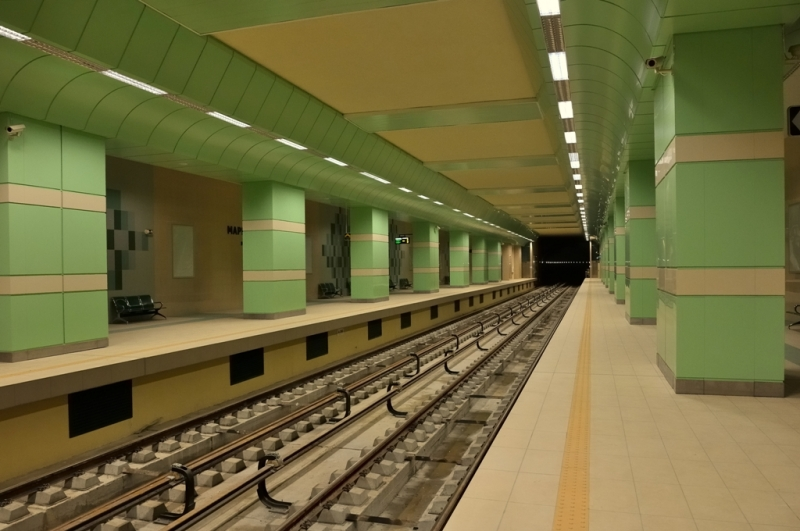

General information
- Location: 1233 Maria Luiza Blvd., Sofia
- Coordinates: 42°42′50.89″N 23°18′47.12″E
- Owner: Sofia Municipality
- Operator: Metropoliten JSC
- Platforms: side
- Tracks: 2
- Bus routes: 8
- Connections
- Tram: 1, 6, 7, 12
- Trolleybus: 1, 5
- Bus: 27, 60, 74, 77, 82, 85, 86, 101, 285

Construction
- Structure type: triple-span
- Depth: 14–15 m
- Platform levels: 2
- Parking: no
- Cycle facilities: yes
- Accessible: an elevator to platforms
- Architect: Sibel Yapage

Other information
- Status: Staffed
- Station code: 2989; 2990
- Website: Official website

History
- Opened: 31 August 2012

Passengers
- 2020: 70,000

Services
| Preceding station | Sofia Metro | Following station |
|---|---|---|
| Central Railway towards Vitosha | M2 line | Han Kubrat towards Obelya |
Location

Knyaginya Maria Luiza Metro Station (Bulgarian: Метростанция „Княгиня Мария Луиза“) is the 21st station to open on the Sofia Metro in Bulgaria. It is situated near the Nadezhda road junction in the northern part of Sofia, at the intersection of Maria Luiza Boulevard and Gen. Stoletov Blvd. It opened on 31 August 2012 and is also known as the fifth station on the M2 line of the metro (station 5-II). It was also the first station on the path of the TBM, which worked on the section between stations 5-II and 9-II (part of phase I of the metro extension project), entirely constructed by the Turkish company Doğuş Construction, part of Doğuş Holding. The station is a shallow triple-span station with two rows of concrete and steel columns. It serves two central tracks and two side platforms. There are four street entrances, two on each side of the boulevard after which the station is named. They lead to a central vestibule, directly above the station.

== Interchange with other public transport ==
West side:

- City bus service: 77, 82, 85, 86, 101, 285

East side:

- Tramway service: 1, 6, 7, 12
- Trolleybus service: 1, 5
- City bus service: 60, 74, 77, 82, 85, 86, 101, 285

== Location ==
The station is located at 116 Maria Luiza Boulevard. As development to the north is restricted by the ground-level mainline railway service passing east to west, this station serves mostly areas located to its south. It serves mainly the residential district of Banishora.

To the south:

- Fifth General Hospital
- Sofia County Cancer Center
- John Paul Hematologic Diseases Hospital
- Zora Eye Clinic
- Nadezhda Trolleybus Depot

To the north:

- The National Railway Infrastructure Company (NRIC) Head Office
- Tsar Boris III National Transportation General Hospital, owned by MTITC

== Naming ==
Initially, in the project the station was named Banishora for the neighbourhood it serves. Afterwards, the official name was chosen to be in honour of Maria Luiza, Princess consort of Bulgaria, as one of four stations constructed under Maria Luiza Boulevard in Sofia, the other three being Central Railway Station, Lavov most, and Serdika II.

== Construction ==
Construction began as part of phase I of the Sofia Metro Extension Project, funded by the ERDF under Priority Axis 3 of OP Transport 2007-2013, Improvement of Intermodality for Passenger and Freight, and the National Budget in the amount of €185,190,000. Phase I consisted in the construction of sour stations and interconnecting tunnels and the inclusion of two stations built in the 1980s, plus another newly built station with national funding only.

The TBM boring began a few hundred metres to the north-west of the station on 6 April 2010. It was decided to bore a single tunnel with a double track with a diameter of 9.4 metres which called for high ceiling stations for the TBM to pass through. Maria Luiza Station was the first station on its path and the TBM reached the station in the first week of October, 2010. By the end of November 2010 the station was constructively entirely completed. By 21 May 2012 the station was fully completed.

The station is a two-level underground station with the tracks and platforms on the lower level and a vestibule with turnstile gates and pedestrian underpasses on the upper level. It is a triple-span station with two rows of columns, one on each side-platform. Both tracks run in the centre and are powered by a third rail +825V. The platforms are 104 metres long. The station is accessible by elevators on all levels from all four entrances at ground level. Escalators are installed on all levels (including ground level) for ease of access going upwards. The main colours of the station are pale green and beige. The architectural project is credited to the Turkish company Doğuş Construction, part of Doğuş Holding.

The station was inaugurated as part of a grand opening ceremony for the inauguration of the entire second BLUE line on 31 August 2012 in the presence of Bulgaria's PM Boyko Borisov and the President of the European Commission Jose Manuel Barroso.

== Gallery ==
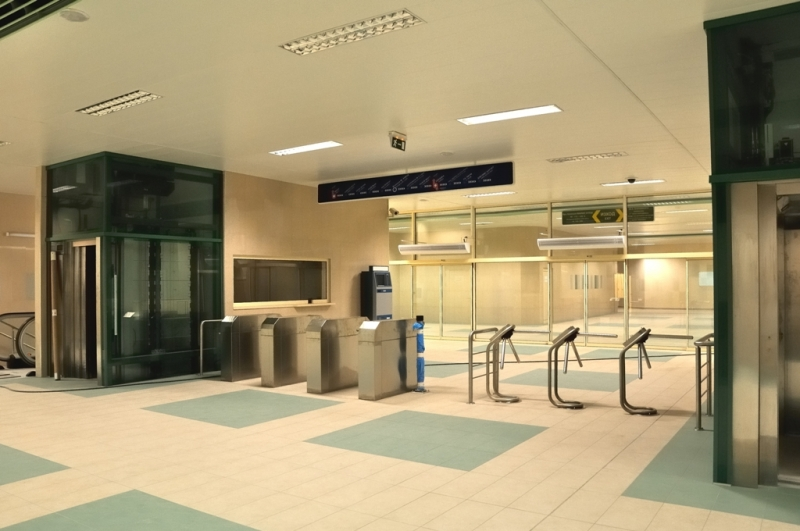

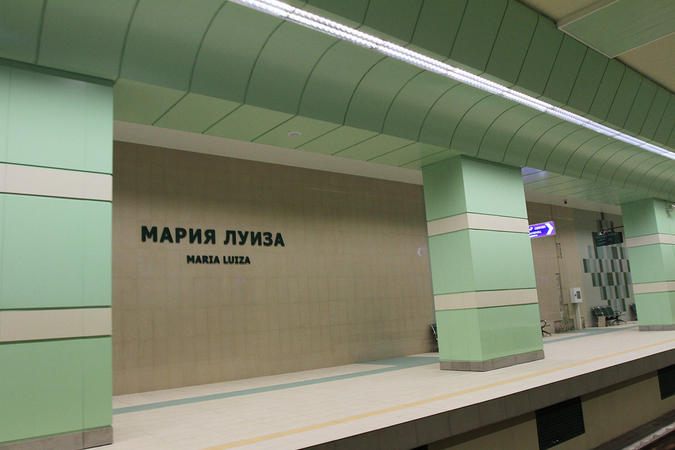

== See also ==
- Sofia Metro
