= Han Kubrat Metro Station =

Sofia metro station

Han Kubrat Хан Кубрат
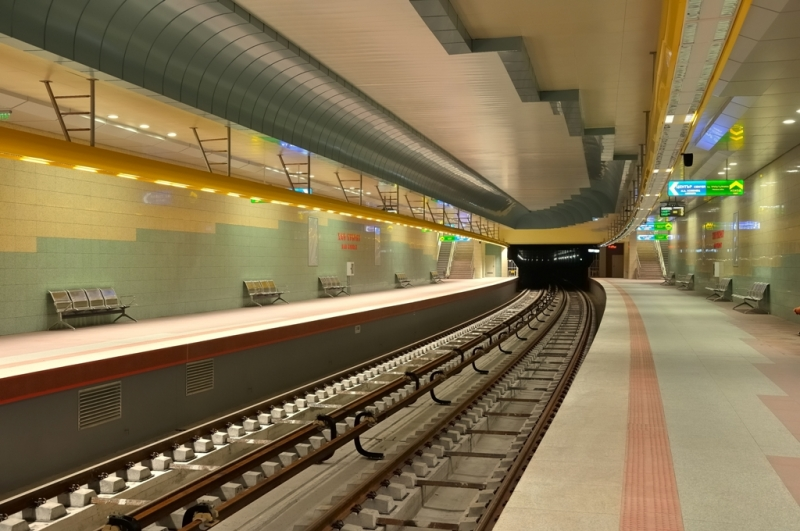

General information
- Location: 1220 Lev Tolstoy, Sofia
- Coordinates: 42°43′22.19″N 23°18′23.56″E
- Owner: Sofia Municipality
- Operator: Metropoliten JSC
- Platforms: side
- Tracks: 2
- Bus routes: 4
- Connections
- Tram: 7
- Bus: 26, 86, 285, N2

Construction
- Structure type: sub-surface
- Platform levels: 2
- Parking: no
- Cycle facilities: yes
- Accessible: an elevator to platforms
- Architect: Slavey Galabov

Other information
- Status: Staffed
- Station code: 2991; 2992
- Website: Official website

History
- Opened: 31 August 2012

Passengers
- 2020: 90,000

Services
Preceding station	Sofia Metro	Following station
Knyaginya Mariya Luiza towards Vitosha	M2 line	Nadezhda towards Obelya
Location

Han Kubrat Metro Station (Bulgarian: Метростанция "Хан Кубрат") is a station on the Sofia Metro in Bulgaria. It opened on 31 August 2012. Bulgaria's PM Boyko Borisov and the President of the European Commission Jose Manuel Barroso inaugurated the new section of the Sofia Metro, which was funded with EU money.

== Interchange with other public transport ==
- Tramway service: 7
- City Bus service: 26, 86, 285, N2

== Gallery ==
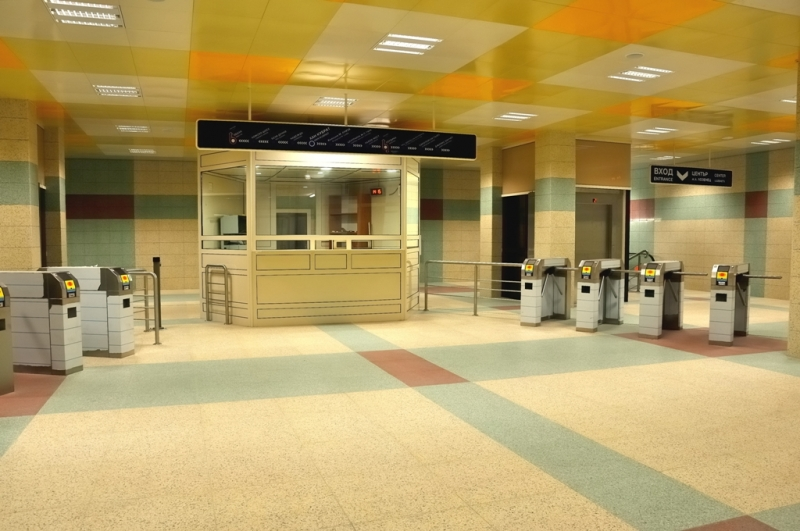
