= Nadezhda Metro Station =

Sofia metro station

Nadezhda Надежда
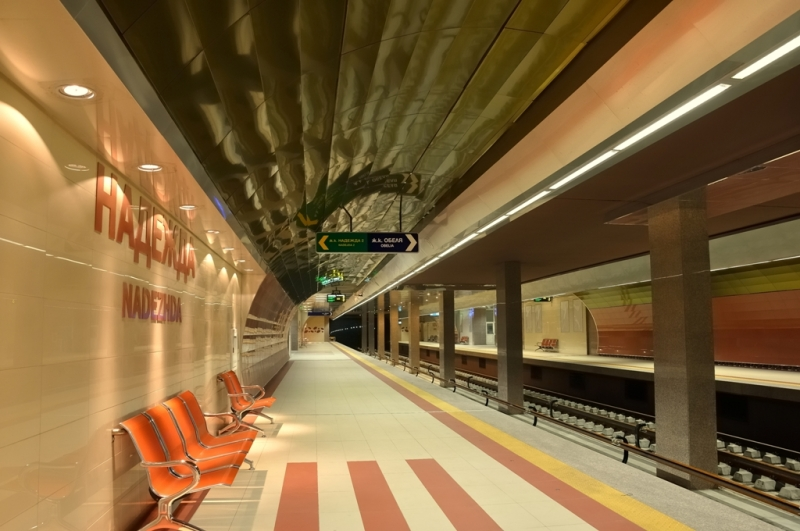

General information
- Location: 1360 Nadezhda 2, Sofia
- Coordinates: 42°43′41.06″N 23°18′3.17″E
- Owner: Sofia Municipality
- Operator: Metropoliten JSC
- Platforms: side
- Tracks: 2
- Bus routes: 2
- Connections
- Bus: 86, N2

Construction
- Structure type: sub-surface
- Platform levels: 2
- Parking: no
- Cycle facilities: yes
- Accessible: an elevator to platforms
- Architect: Irena Derlipanska; Krasen Andreev; V. Nikolova

Other information
- Status: Staffed
- Station code: 2993; 2994
- Website: Official website

History
- Opened: 31 August 2012

Passengers
- 2020: 160,000

Services
Preceding station	Sofia Metro	Following station
Han Kubrat towards Vitosha	M2 line	Beli Dunav towards Obelya
Location

Nadezhda Metro Station (Bulgarian: Метростанция „Надежда“) is a station on the Sofia Metro in Bulgaria. It opened on 31 August 2012. Bulgaria's PM Boyko Borisov and the President of the European Commission Jose Manuel Barroso inaugurated the new section of the Sofia Metro, which was funded with EU money.

== Interchange with other public transport ==
- City Bus service: 86, N2

== Gallery ==
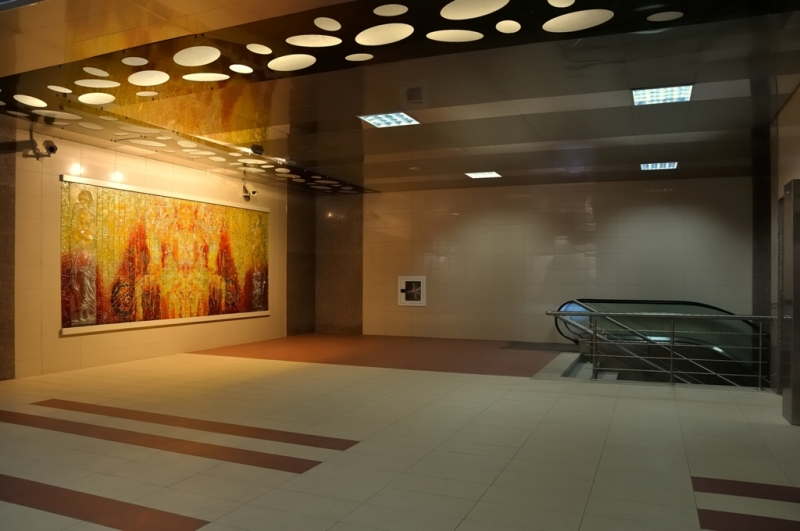
