= Beli Dunav Metro Station =

Sofia metro station

Beli Dunav Бели Дунав
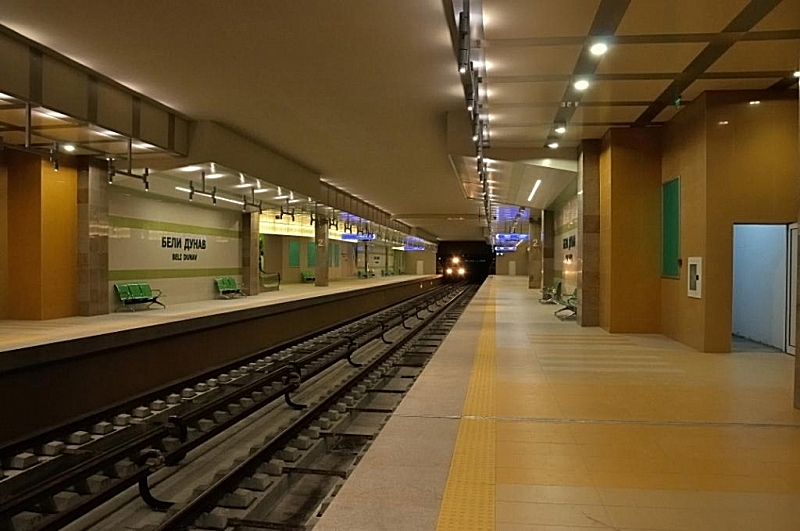

General information
- Location: 1231 Vrabnitsa 1, Sofia
- Coordinates: 42°44′7.50″N 23°17′34.39″E
- Owner: Sofia Municipality
- Operator: Metropoliten JSC
- Platforms: side
- Tracks: 2
- Bus routes: 4
- Connections
- Tram: 6
- Bus: 26, 108, 285, N2

Construction
- Structure type: sub-surface
- Depth: 12–14 m
- Platform levels: 2
- Parking: yes
- Cycle facilities: yes
- Accessible: an elevator to platforms
- Architect: Irena Derlipanska; Boris Sedmakov

Other information
- Status: Staffed
- Station code: 2995; 2996
- Website: Official website

History
- Opened: 31 August 2012

Passengers
- 2020: 210,000

Services
Preceding station	Sofia Metro	Following station
Nadezhda towards Vitosha	M2 line	Lomsko shose towards Obelya
Location

Beli Dunav Metro Station (Bulgarian: Метростанция "Бели Дунав") is a station on the Sofia Metro in Bulgaria. It opened on 31 August 2012. Bulgaria's PM Boyko Borisov and the President of the European Commission Jose Manuel Barroso inaugurated the new section of the Sofia Metro, which was funded with EU money.

== Interchange with other public transport ==
- Tramway service: 6
- City Bus service: 26, 108, 285, N2

== Gallery ==
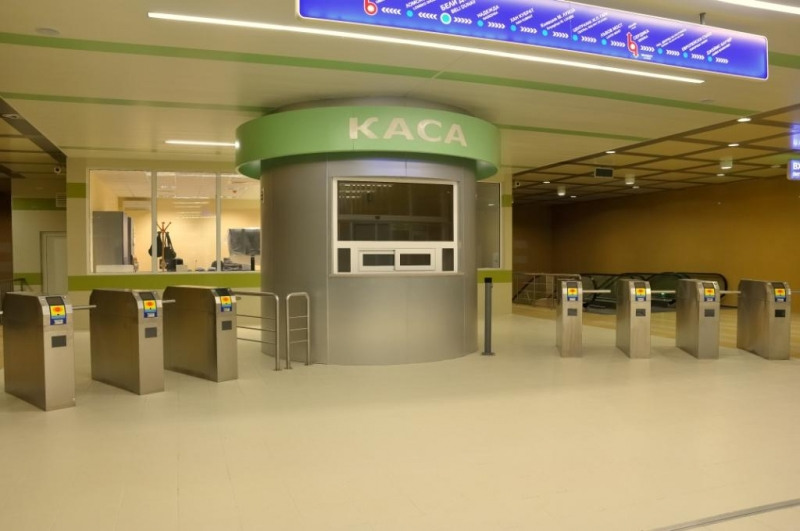
