= Lomsko shose Metro Station =

Sofia metro station

Lomsko shose Ломско шосе
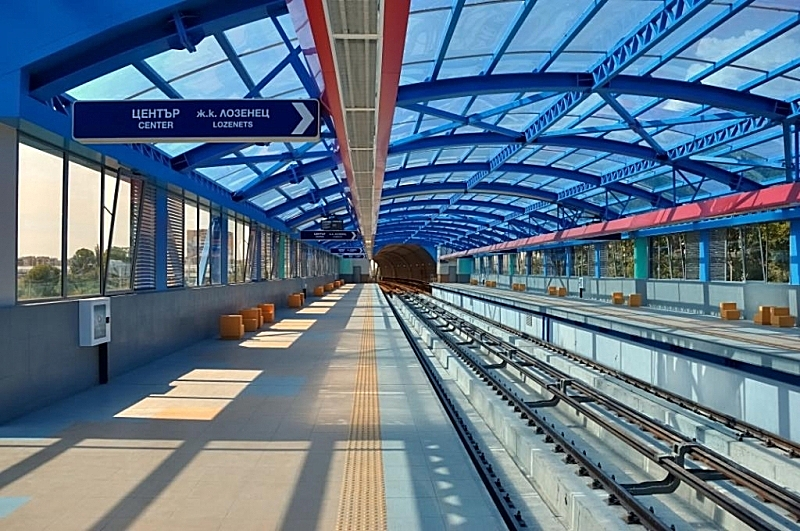

General information
- Location: 1231 Vrabnitsa, Sofia
- Coordinates: 42°44′25.69″N 23°17′14.34″E
- Owner: Sofia Municipality
- Operator: Metropoliten JSC
- Platforms: side
- Tracks: 2
- Bus routes: 2
- Connections
- Bus: 26, N2

Construction
- Structure type: overground
- Platform levels: 2
- Parking: no
- Cycle facilities: no
- Accessible: an elevator to platforms
- Architect: Slavi Galabov; Violeta Nikolova; Petar Staykov

Other information
- Status: Staffed
- Station code: 2997; 2998
- Website: Official website

History
- Opened: 31 August 2012

Passengers
- 2020: 90,000

Services
Preceding station	Sofia Metro	Following station
Beli Dunav towards Vitosha	M2 line	Obelya Terminus
Location

Lomsko shose Metro Station (Bulgarian: Метростанция "Ломско шосе") is a station on the Sofia Metro in Sofia, Bulgaria. It opened on 31 August 2012. Bulgaria's Prime Minister Boyko Borisov and the President of the European Commission Jose Manuel Barroso inaugurated the new section of the Sofia Metro, which was largely funded with European Union financing.

== Interchange with other public transport ==
- City Bus service: 26, N2

== Gallery ==
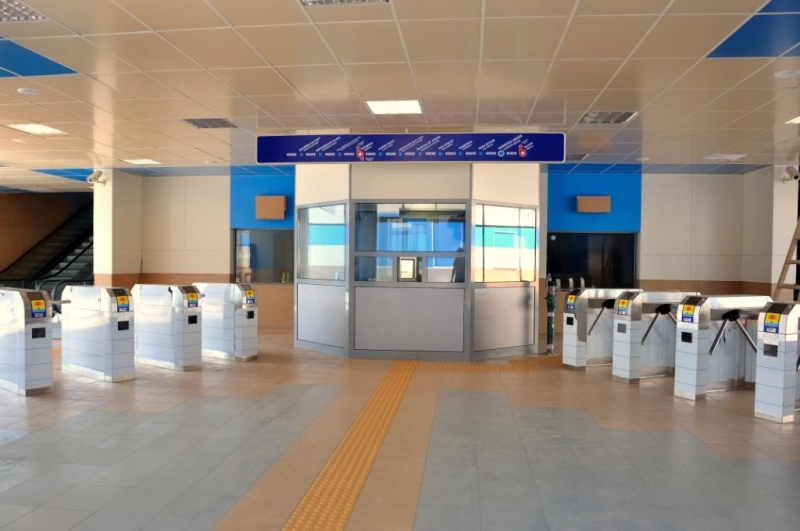

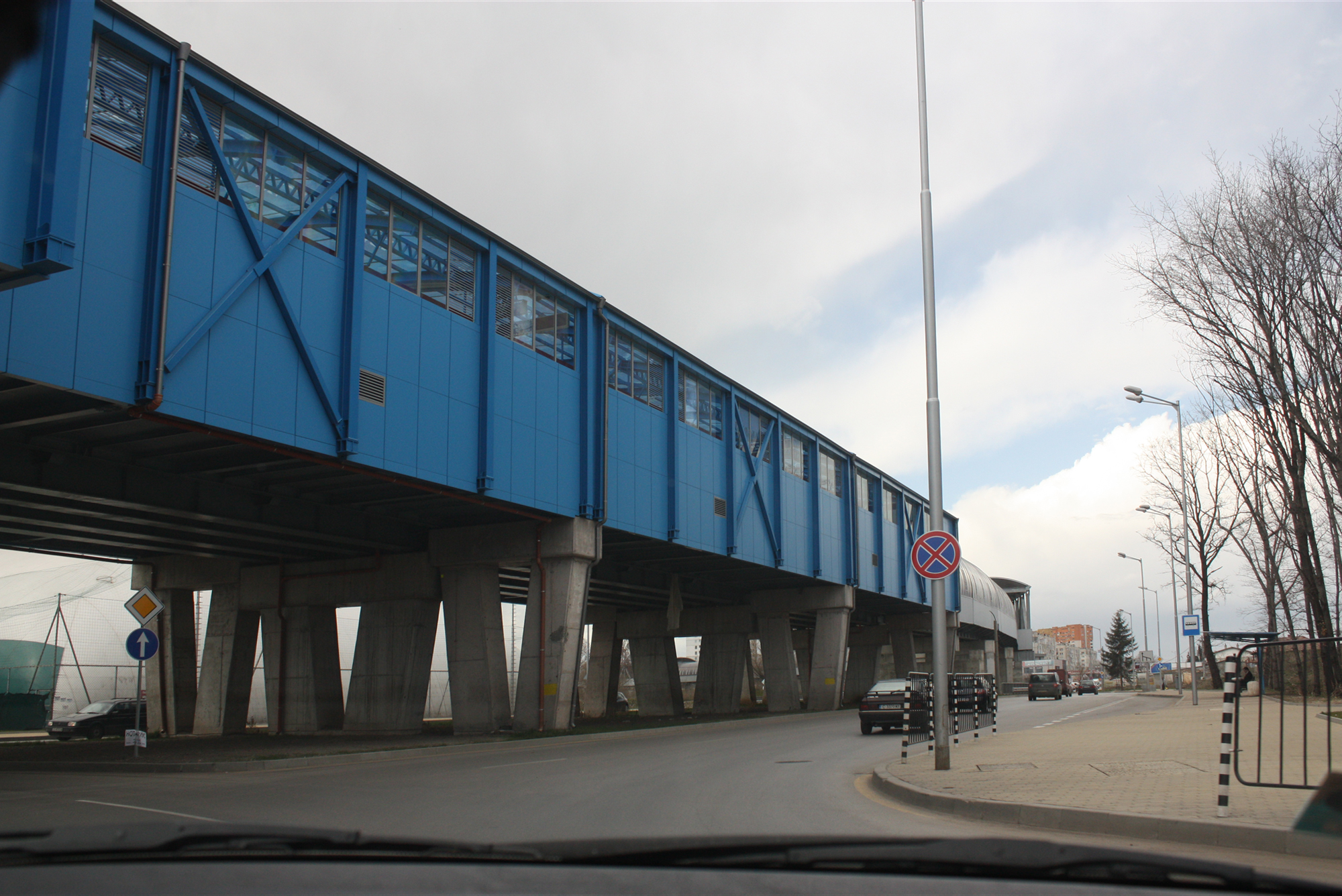
Lomsko shose Metro Station exterior
