= Lavov most Metro Station =

Sofia metro station

Lavov most Лъвов мост
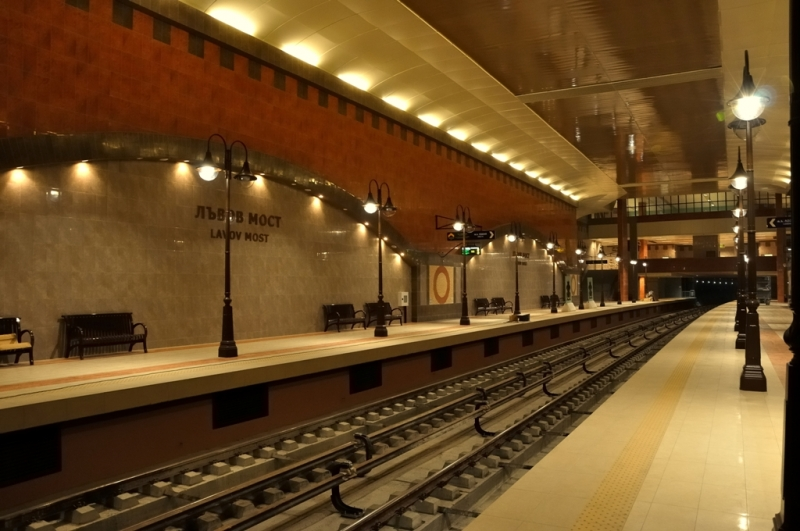

General information
- Location: 1202 Sofia center, Sofia
- Coordinates: 42°42′20.24″N 23°19′25.57″E
- Owner: Sofia Municipality
- Operator: Metropoliten JSC
- Platforms: side
- Tracks: 2
- Bus routes: 14
- Connections
- Tram: 4, 12, 18
- Trolleybus: 6
- Bus: 11, 21, 22, 78, 85, 86, 213, 285, 305, 309, 310, 404, 413, N2

Construction
- Structure type: sub-surface
- Platform levels: 2
- Parking: no
- Cycle facilities: yes
- Accessible: yes
- Architect: Sibel Yapage

Other information
- Status: Staffed
- Station code: 2985; 2986
- Website: Official website

History
- Opened: 31 August 2012

Passengers
- 2020: 140,000

Services
Preceding station	Sofia Metro	Following station
Serdika II towards Vitosha	M2 line	Central Railway towards Obelya
Location

Lavov most Metro Station (Bulgarian: Метростанция "Лъвов мост") is a station on the Sofia Metro in Bulgaria. It opened on 31 August 2012. Bulgaria's PM Boyko Borisov and the President of the European Commission Jose Manuel Barroso inaugurated the new section of the Sofia Metro, which was funded with EU money.

== Interchange with other public transport ==
- Tramway service: 4, 12, 18
- Trolleybus service: 6
- City Bus service: 11, 78, 85, 86, 213, 285, 305, 309, 310, 404, 413

== Gallery ==
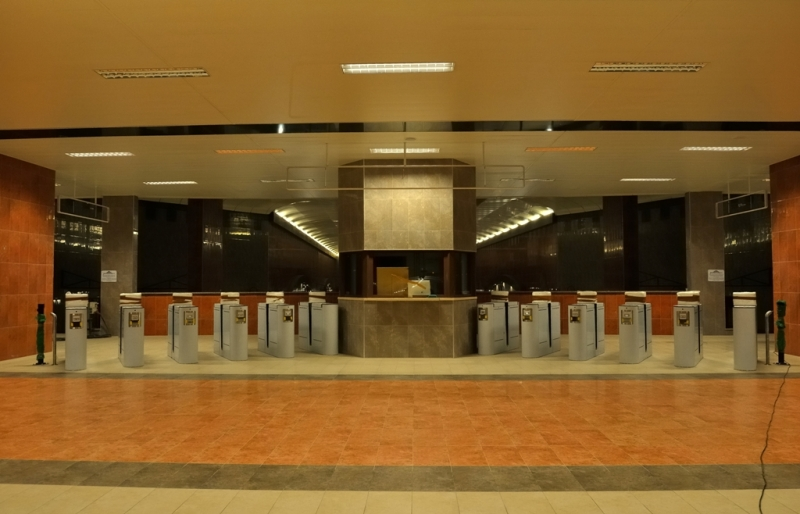
