= Central Railway Metro station =

Sofia metro station

Central Railway Централна жп гара
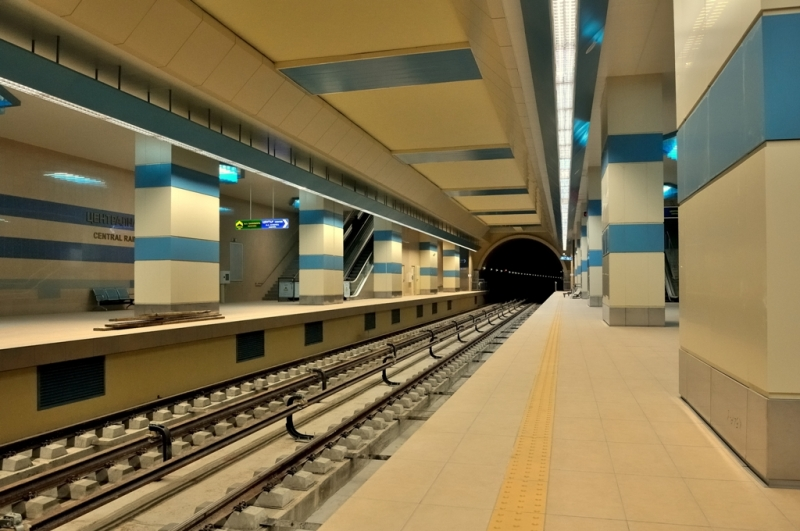

General information
- Location: 1202 Sofia center, Sofia
- Coordinates: 42°42′37.94″N 23°19′16.09″E
- Owner: Sofia Municipality
- Operator: Metropoliten JSC
- Platforms: side
- Tracks: 2
- Bus routes: 14
- Connections
- Train: Sofia Central Railway station
- Tram: 1, 3, 4, 6, 7, 12
- Bus: 21, 22, 60, 74, 77, 78, 82, 85, 101, 213, 305, 404, 413, N2, Central Bus Station Sofia

Construction
- Structure type: sub-surface
- Platform levels: 2
- Parking: yes
- Cycle facilities: yes
- Accessible: an elevator to platforms
- Architect: Sibel Yapage

Other information
- Status: Staffed
- Station code: 2987; 2988
- Website: Official website

History
- Opened: 31 August 2012

Passengers
- 2020: 300,000

Services
| Preceding station | Sofia Metro | Following station |
|---|---|---|
| Lavov most towards Vitosha | M2 line | Knyaginya Mariya Luiza towards Obelya |
Location

The Metro station Central Railway (Bulgarian: Метростанция „Централна жп гара“) serves Sofia Central Station on the Sofia Metro in Bulgaria. It opened on 31 August 2012. Bulgaria's PM Boyko Borisov and the President of the European Commission Jose Manuel Barroso inaugurated the new section of the Sofia Metro, which was funded with EU money.

== Interchange with other public transport ==
West side:

- Tramway service: 1, 3, 4, 6, 7, 12
- City Bus service: 60, 74, 77, 78, 82, 85, 101, 213, 214, 285, 305, 404, 413
- Railway service: All trains

East side:

- Tramway service: 1
- Regional Bus service: Anton, Dren, Dupnitsa, Karlovo, Klisura, Koprivshtitsa, Kostenets, Kyustendil, Mirkovo, Pernik
- National bus service: All buses
- International bus service: All buses

== Gallery ==
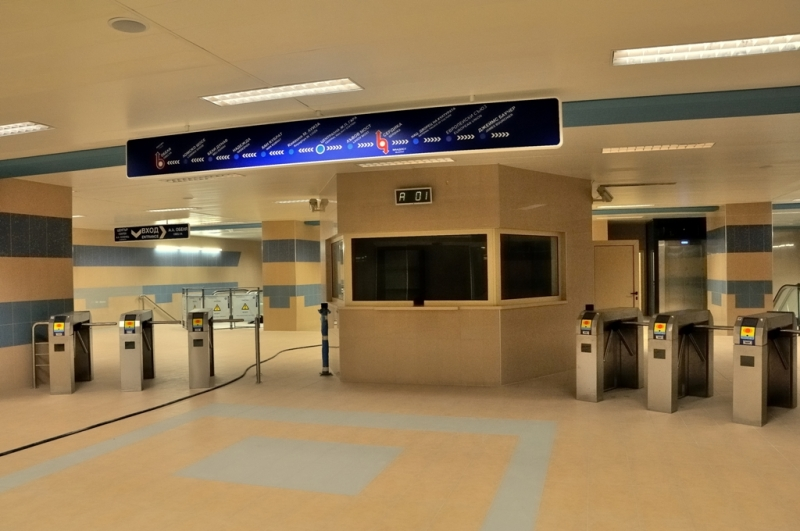

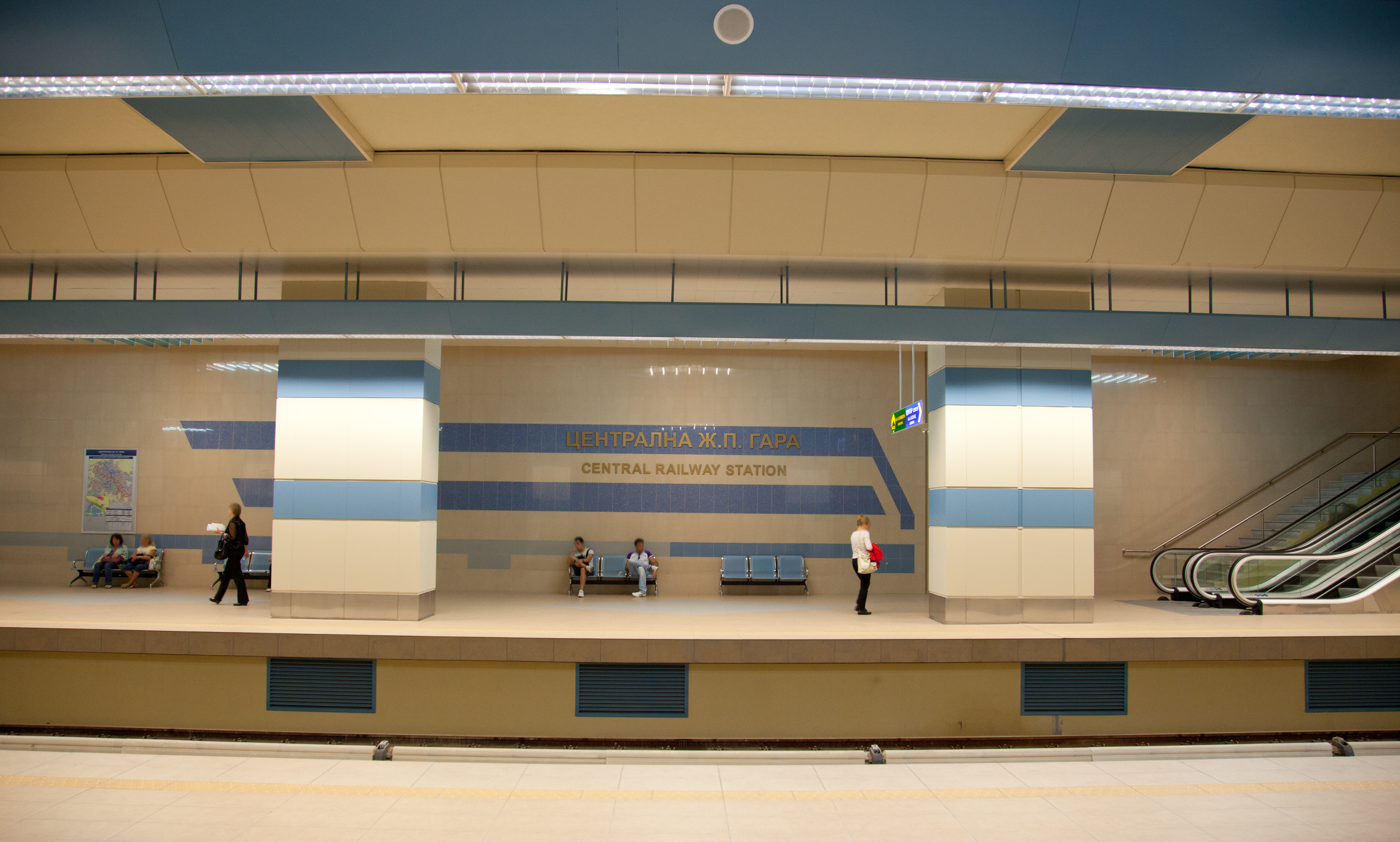

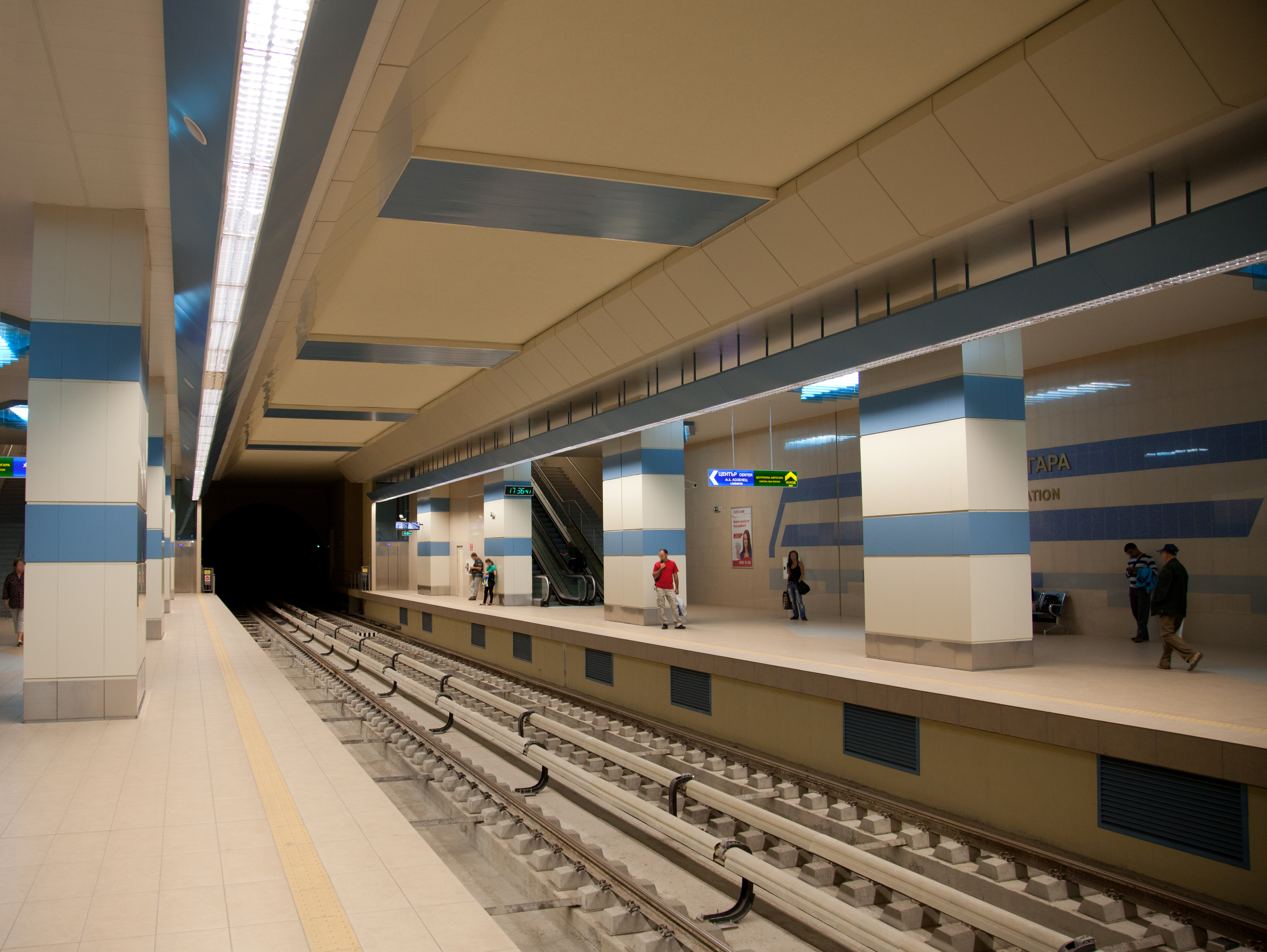

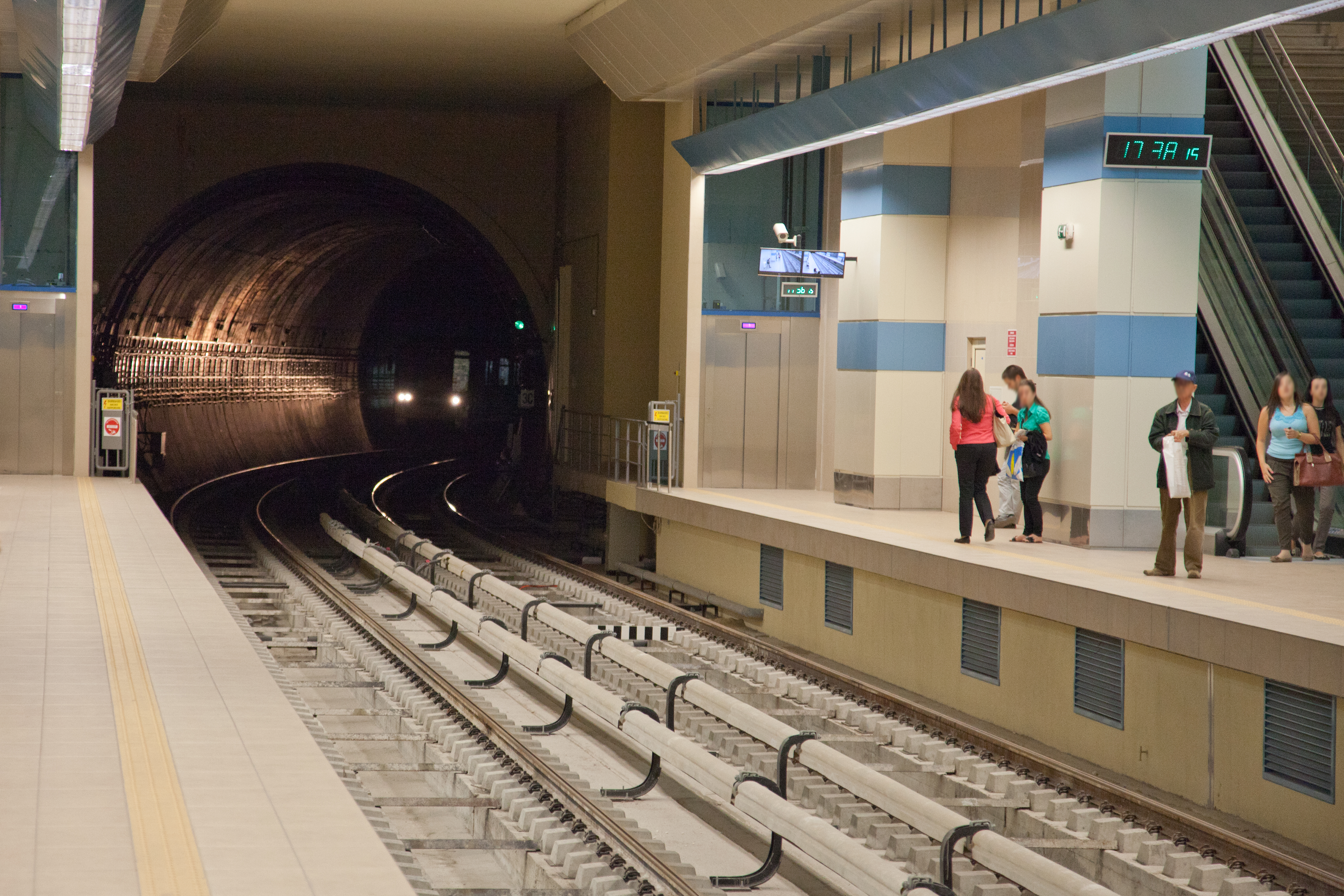

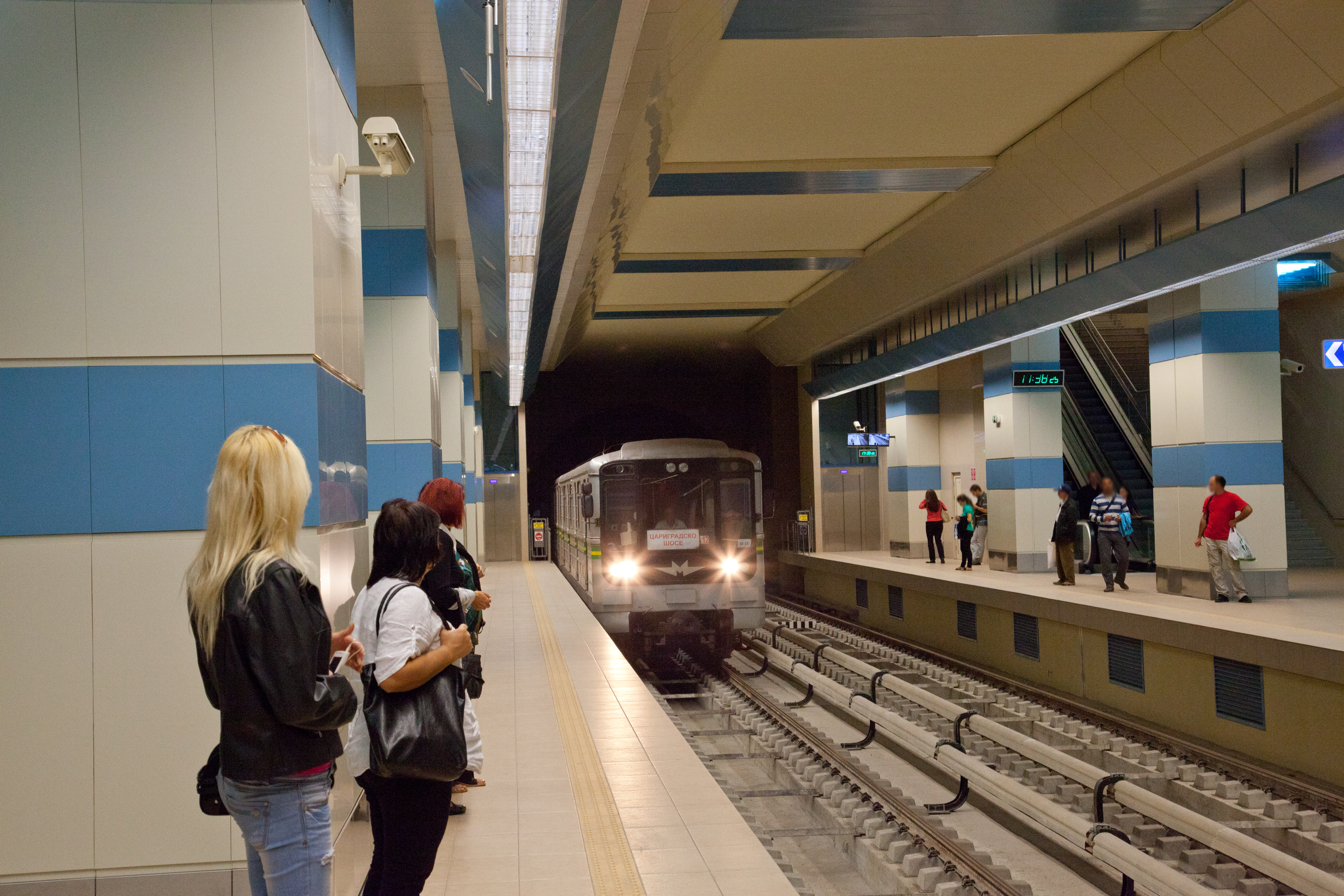

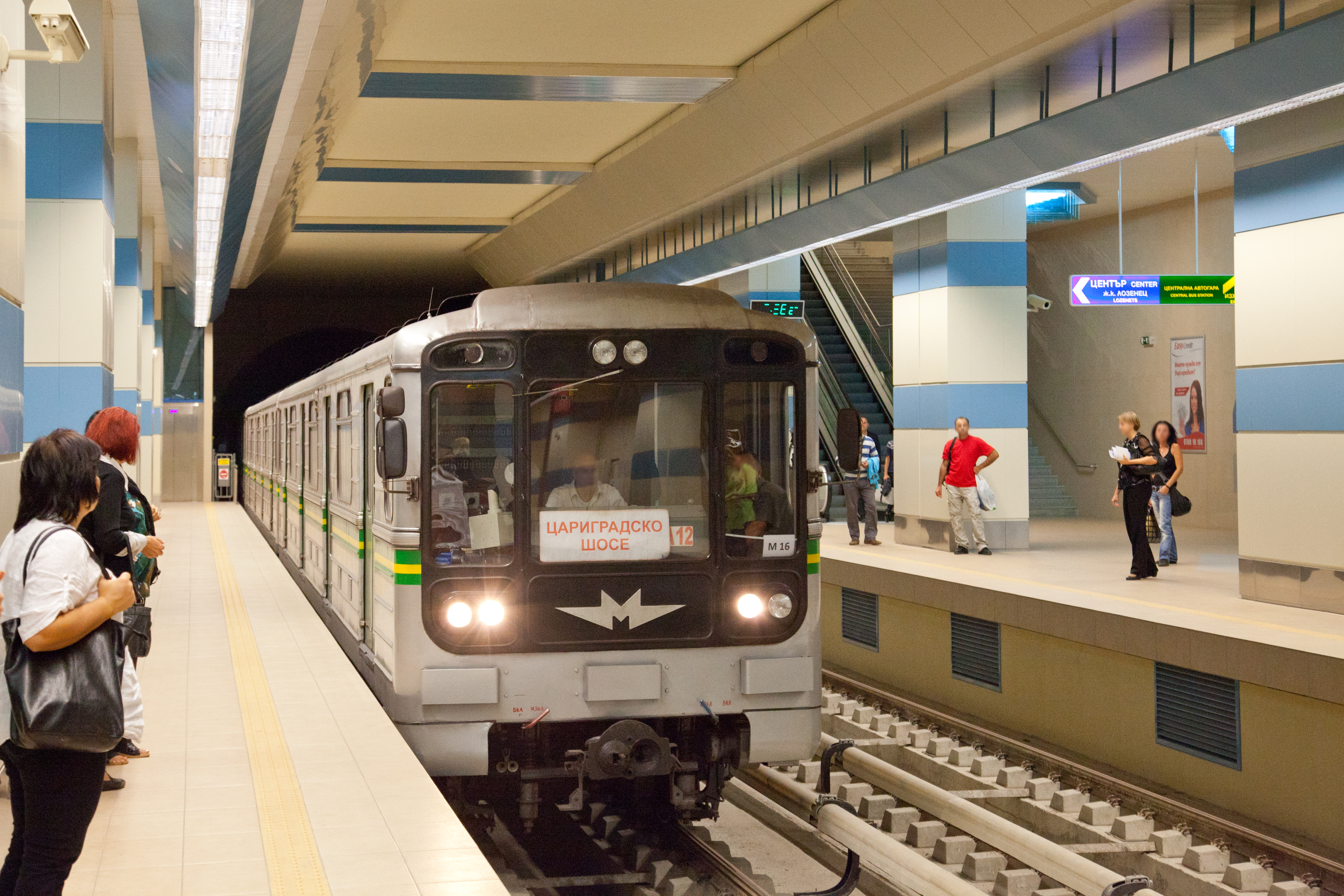

== See also ==
- Sofia Metro
