= Naum Torbov =

Bulgarian architect

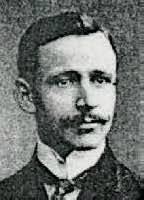
- Architect
- Born: 18 November 1880; Gopeš, Manastir Vilayet, Ottoman Empire
- Died: 2 June 1952 (aged 71); Sofia, Bulgaria
- Occupation: Architect
- Buildings: Sofia Central Market Hall

Naum Torbov (18 November 1880 – 2 June 1952; Bulgarian: Наум Торбов) was a Bulgarian architect.

== Biography ==
Naum Torbov was an ethnic Aromanian. He was born on 18 November 1880 in Gopeš (Aromanian: Gopish) village in the Ottoman Macedonia. His family emigrated to the Principality of Bulgaria and settled in the town of Oryahovo. Naum enrolled in architecture at the National University of Arts in Bucharest, Romania, and he graduated in 1904. After the studies he came back to Bulgaria and started working at the Ministry of Public Buildings and Roads. In 1906 Torbov was appointed to the post of head of the department of architecture by the Sofia municipality. In 1908 he started his private practice.

Naum Torbov was a follower of the national romantic stream in architecture. More than a hundred public, residential and industrial buildings are constructed by his projects in the towns of Sofia, Oryahovo, Silistra, Botevgrad, Mezdra.

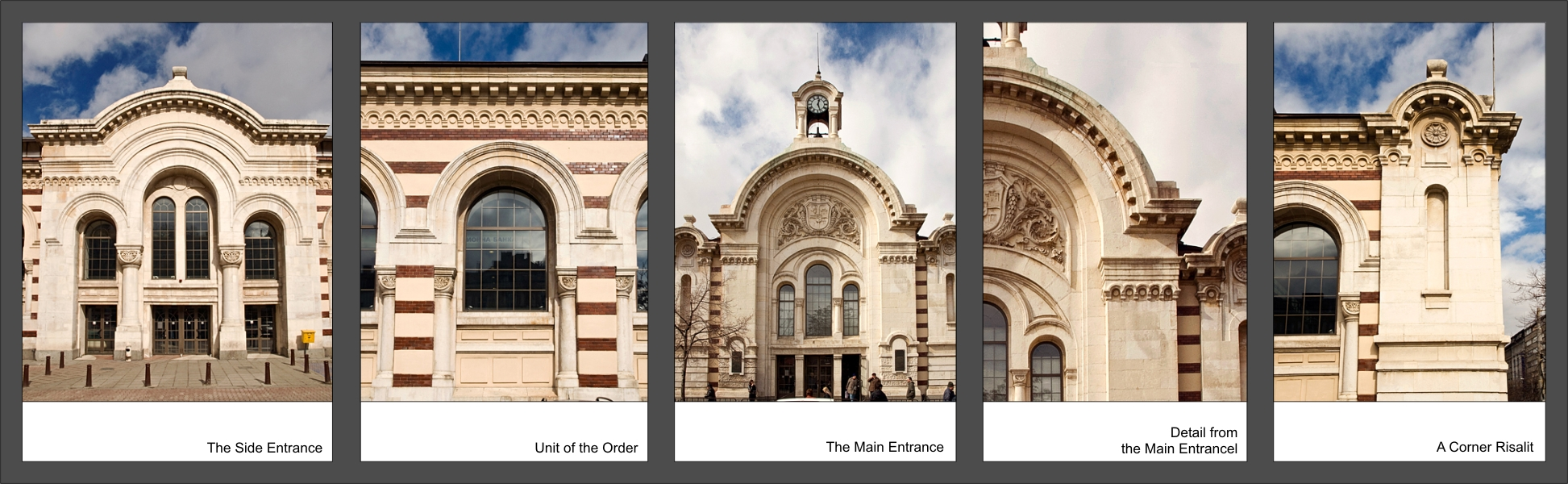
The Central Market Hall

== Works ==
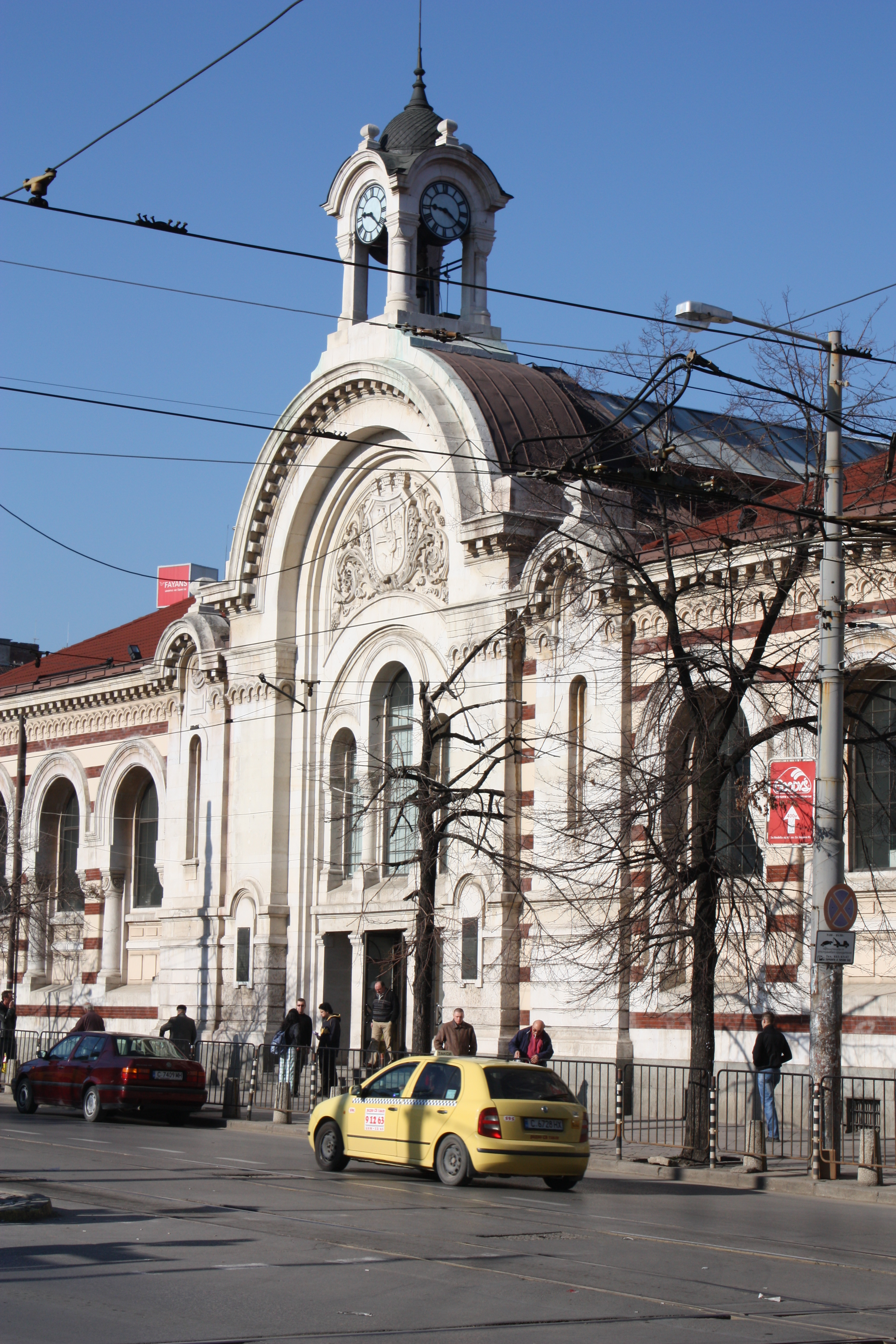
The Central Market Hall

Amidst the most famous buildings by him are:

- Hotel Continental
- Hotel Paris
- Hentovi house - Knyaz Boris I str. 135, Sofia (1906)
- Stanishevi house - Miladinovi brothers str. 27, Sofia (1909)
- Masonry edifice - Hristo Botev blvd 71 (1910)
- Sofia Central Market Hall - Knyaginya Marie Louise blvd, Sofia (1911)
- Dimitar Kostov's edifice - Alabin str. 36, Sofia (1914)
- Romanian institute - Exarch Joseph str., Sofia (1933)

== Sources ==
- Sofia Culture - a Sofia Municipality Site
- Bulgarian Romantic Secession (in Bulgarian)
- Sofia City Municipality Official Site (in Bulgarian)
