= Tsentralna =

Tsentralna can refer to:

- Tsentralna (Dnipropetrovsk Metro), a station under construction in Dnipropetrovsk, Ukraine
- Tsentralno–Zavodska Line, a metro line in Dnipropetrovsk, Ukraine
- Central Council of Ukraine (Tsentralna Rada), revolutionary parliament of the Ukrainian People's Republic
- Central Railway Metro Station (Tsentralna), a metro station of the Sofia Metro in Bulgaria
