= Gopeš =

Gopeš Гопеш Gopish
- Village
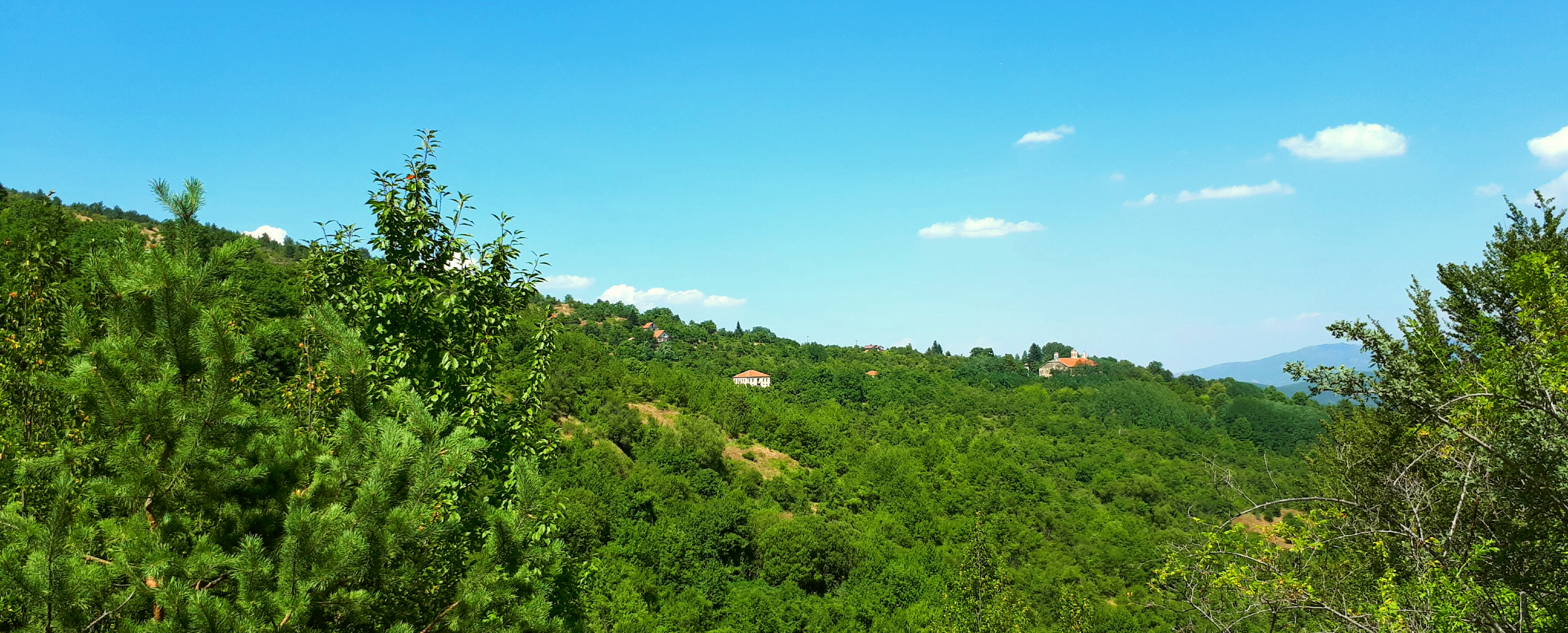
- Panoramic view of the village

- Location within North Macedonia
- Coordinates: 41°07′N 21°07′E
- Country: North Macedonia
- Region: Pelagonia
- Municipality: Bitola

Population (2021)
  - Total: 1
- Time zone: UTC+1 (CET)
  - Summer (DST): UTC+2 (CEST)
- Car plates: BT
- Website: .

Gopeš (Macedonian: Гопеш, Aromanian: Gopish) is a village in the municipality of Bitola, North Macedonia. It used to be part of the former municipality of Capari.

== History ==
Gopeš is an old Aromanian settlement in the region and its establishment dates possibly prior to the Ottoman conquest of the Balkans. During the first World War, Gopeš was occupied by the Bulgarian military who evacuated most of the Aromanian villagers and sent them into the interior of Bulgaria and Serbia. The relocation of local Aromanians was due to Bulgarian forces being concerned that pro-Greek and pro-Serbian sympathies existed among them resulting in possible cooperation with the Entente Allies. While in exile, some villagers had to fend for themselves whereas others for the Bulgarians did forced labour. In 1919 only 110 families returned to Gopeš from a previous 300 families that inhabited the village prior to the war.

== Demographics ==
As of the 2021 census, Gopeš had 1 resident with the following ethnic composition:

- Vlachs 1

According to the 2002 census, the village had a total of 0 inhabitants.

== Notable people ==
- Naum Torbov (1880–1952), Bulgarian Aromanian architect
