= Central Sofia Market Hall =

- Централни софийски хали
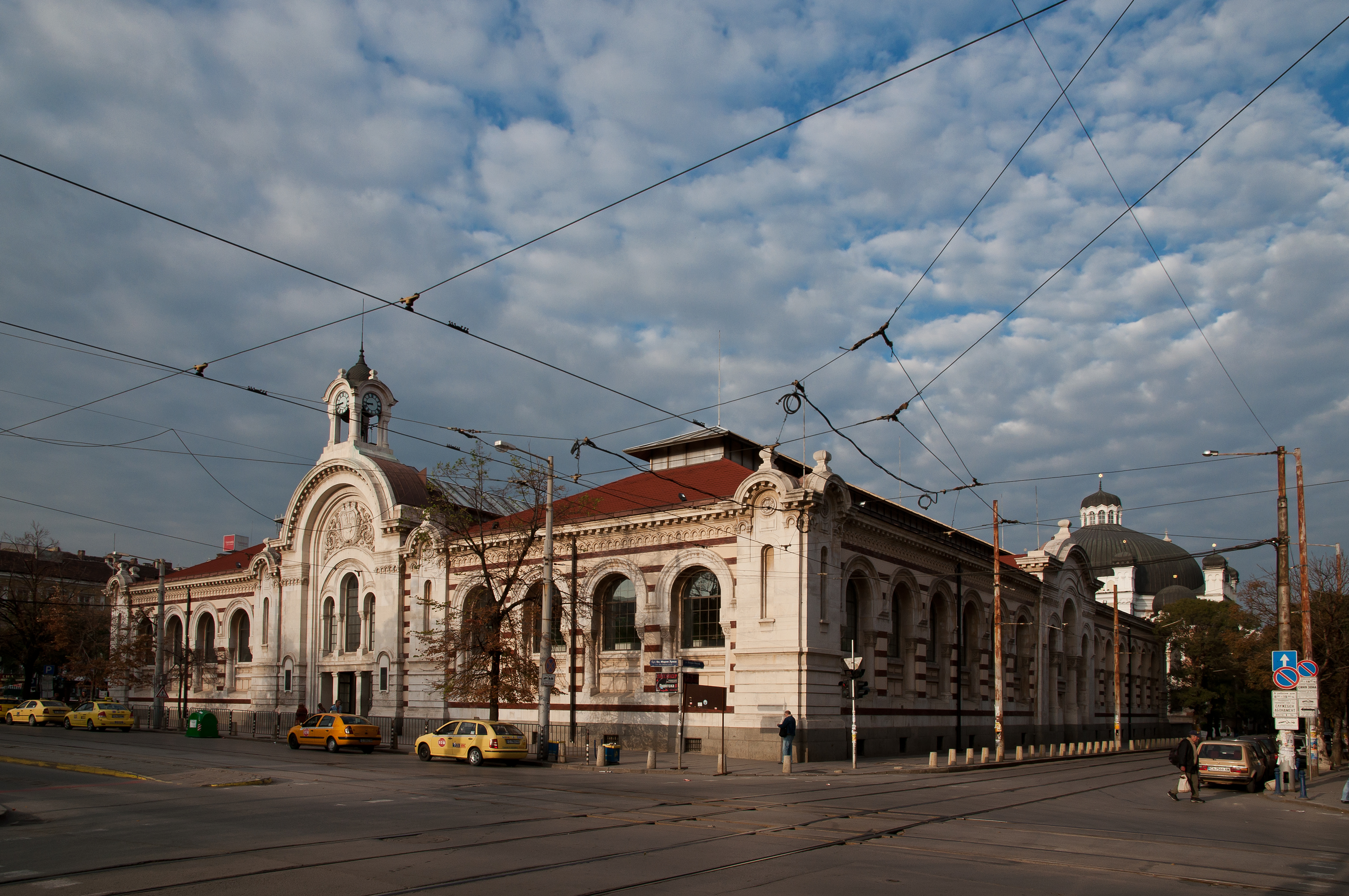
- View from the northeast
- Interactive map of the Central Sofia Market Hall area

General information
- Type: Market
- Architectural style: Byzantine Revival
- Location: 25 Maria Luisa Blvd., Sofia, Bulgaria
- Coordinates: 42°42′0″N 23°19′18″E
- Opened: 1911
- Owner: Ashtrom AD

Technical details
- Floor count: 3

Design and construction
- Architect: Naum Torbov

Other information
- Public transit: Tram: Lines 1, 12, 18, 20, 22 and 27 Metro: Lines 1 and 2

The Central Sofia Market Hall (Bulgarian: Централни софийски хали, romanized: Tsentralni sofiyski hali), known popularly simply as The Market Hall (Халите, Halite) is a covered market in the centre of Sofia, the capital of Bulgaria, located on Marie Louise Boulevard. It was opened in 1911 and is today an important trade centre in the city.

== History ==
The construction of the building, which spreads over 3,200 m^{2}, began in 1909 after the design of architect Naum Torbov was selected in 1907, and took two years to complete.

Until the late 1940s the Sofia municipality let out about 170 shops and stalls in the Central Sofia Market Hall. The rents and the product quality were strictly regulated. The market hall building's interior was significantly altered after the 1950s and the market was closed in 1988 in order to be reconstructed, modernized and once again opened for Easter in 2000, after 75% of it was acquired by the Israeli company Ashtrom, who invested $7 million in it.

Today the Central Sofia Market Hall houses a supermarket and only a few other shops.

== Architecture ==
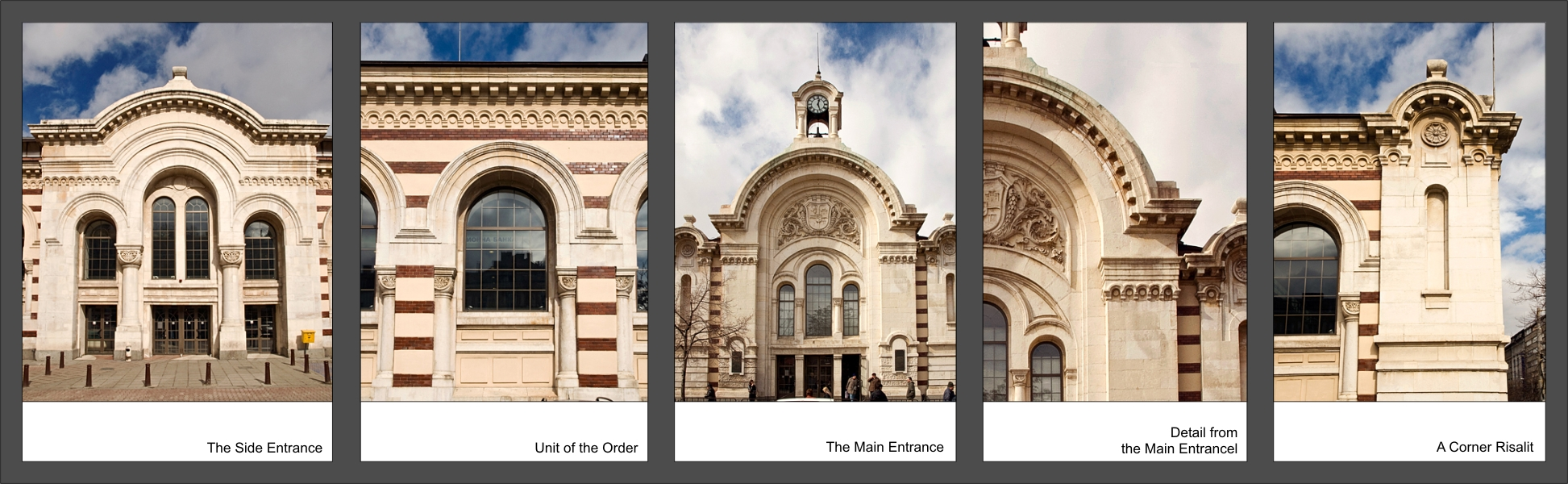
Highlights of the Central Market Hall

The style of the building, which is regarded as Torbov's best work, is Neo-Renaissance, featuring also elements of Neo-Byzantine architecture and Neo-Baroque. The façade is known for its relief of the coat of arms of Sofia above the main entrance created by the artist Haralampi Tachev. The famous little clock tower with three dials tops the edifice. The building was originally constructed with four entrances, though not all are used today.

== Gallery ==
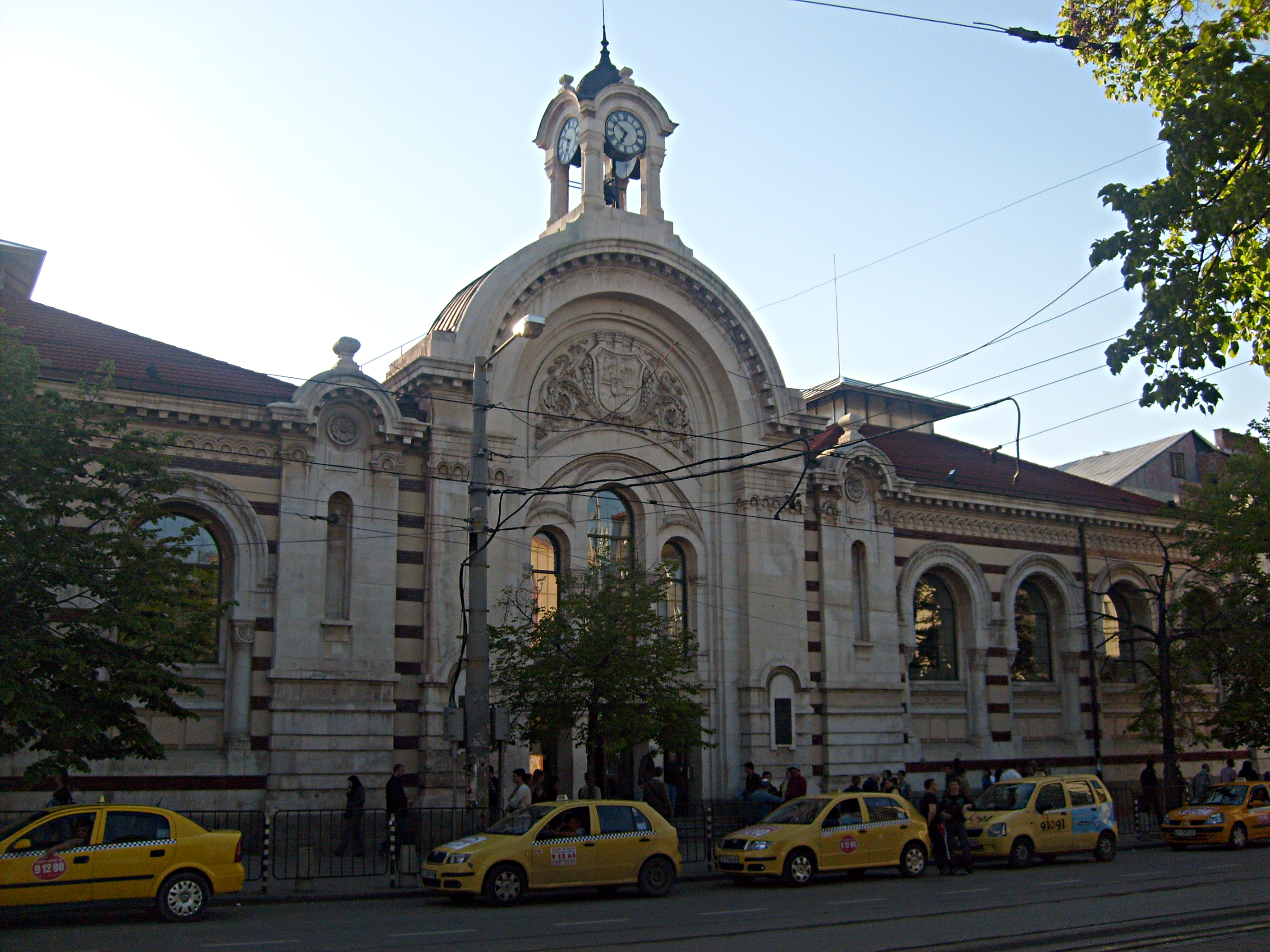
Front view

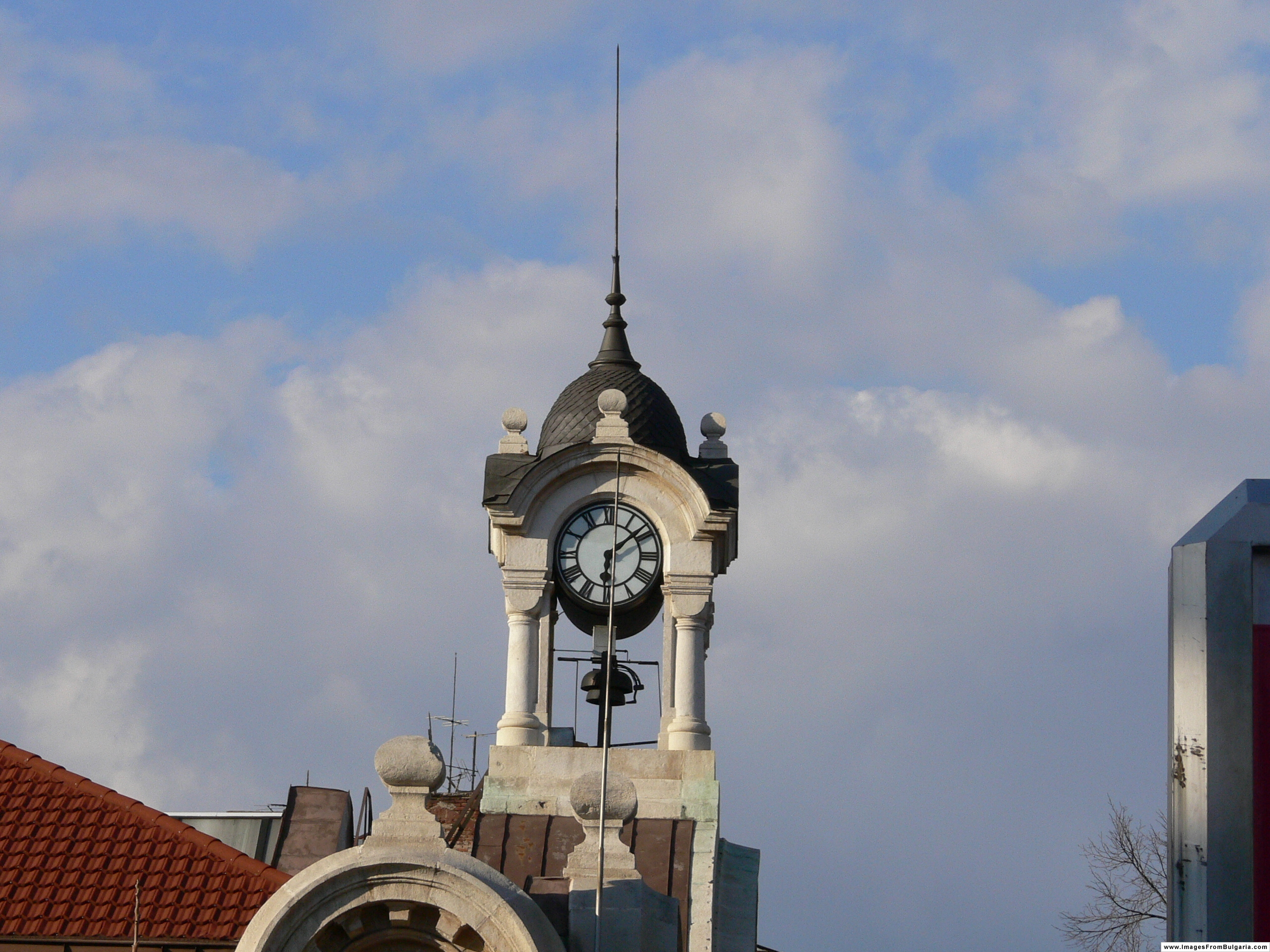
Detail of the clock tower

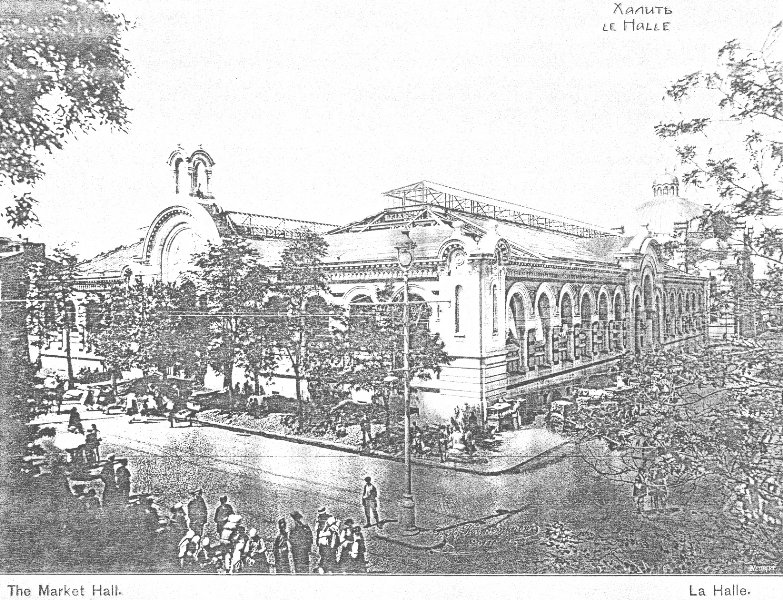
View of the Market Hall in 1912
