= Maria Luiza Petzl-Erler =

- Known for: Genetics, molecular biology, immunology

Academic background
- Education: Universidade Federal do Paraná (UFPR); Ludwig-Maximilians-Universität München

Academic work
- Main interests: Evolutionary origins and functional implications of human genetic diversity

Maria Luiza Petzl-Erler is a researcher and an academic. She is a senior professor in the Department of Genetics at the Federal University of Paraná.

Petzl-Erler's research on human genetic diversity is focused on population genetics, microevolution, and complex diseases. She is most known for her work in the field of pemphigus genetics and immunogenetics. She collaborated with other scientists to investigate the arrival and migration of humans on the American continent during pre-historic times and participated in pharmacogenetic studies.

== Biography and education ==
In 1971, she enrolled in the Biology program at UFPR. By 1972, she began participating in Newton Freire-Maia's research group. Throughout her undergraduate studies, she became involved in research on congenital malformations. She completed her bachelor's degree in 1974 and entered the Master's program in Genetics at UFPR in 1975, under the mentorship of Eleidi Chautard Freire-Maia. After obtaining her M.Sc. in 1977, she pursued her doctorate at LMU Munich, Germany. There, she was supervised by Ekkehard D. Albert and Hartwig Cleve, earning her Dr. rer. nat. in Anthropology and Human Genetics. In 1984, she became a researcher and collaborating professor in the Postgraduate Program in Genetics at the Genetics Department of UFPR. Furthermore, she conducted postdoctoral research at LMU in Munich and Stanford University in the USA in 1987 and 1989, respectively.

== Career ==
Petzl-Erler joined the Federal University of Paraná in 1985, where she has been involved in teaching and research. In 1988, she established the Laboratory of Human Molecular Genetics at the UFPR, starting a research group in Paraná State employing direct DNA analysis in human genetics and leading it until 2018. In 1991, she was integrated into the academic faculty of the UFPR. Moreover, she is a level I research fellow at the Conselho Nacional de Desenvolvimento Científico e Tecnológico (CNPq) and holds a Senior Professor position in the Graduated Program of Genetics at the UFPR.

== Research ==
Petzl-Erler has authored research papers on a range of topics, including genetics, evolution, and immunology. In her early research she investigated the HLA polymorphism in Native South Americans as well as in fogo selvagem, a subtype of pemphigus foliaceus that is endemic in certain geographic regions of Brazil. Her population genetic analyses revealed a distinct evolution and diversification pattern of HLA-B alleles in the native Kaingang and Guarani populations of southern Brazil. Significant differences were found between these populations and others, whereas HLA-A and HLA-C alleles are more conserved across populations. Furthermore, indigenous variants of HLA-B were not found in any other populations worldwide, including North American natives, and their origin was attributed to gene conversion rather than point mutation. This discovery resulted in the formulation of the allele turnover hypothesis to explain the natural evolution of the remarkably high HLA diversity observed in human populations. Furthermore, she also collaborated with scientists in Brazil, Europe, and the USA on studies about the dispersal of humans all over the world in pre-historic times.

The influence of HLA on susceptibility to fogo selvagem (endemic pemphigus foliaceus) was also first described by Petzl-Erler. This eventually resulted in investigations about genetic aspects of this disease. In 2020, she reviewed the genetic factors influencing susceptibility, pathogenesis, and treatment response in pemphigus vulgaris and pemphigus foliaceus, emphasizing the need for functional genomics studies, longitudinal investigations, and improved animal models to advance understanding and management of these autoimmune skin diseases.

== Selected articles ==
- Belich, M. P., Madrigal, J. A., Hildebrand, W. H., Zemmour, J., Williams, R. C., Luz, R., Petzl-Erler, M. L., & Parham, P. (1992). Unusual HLA-B alleles in two tribes of Brazilian Indians. Nature, 357(6376), 326–329. https://doi.org/10.1038/357326a0
- Petzl-Erler, M. L., Luz, R., & Sotomaior, V. S. (1993). The HLA polymorphism of two distinctive South-American Indian tribes: the Kaingang and the Guarani. Tissue Antigens, 41(5), 227–237. https://doi.org/10.1111/j.1399-0039.1993.tb02011.x
- Parham, P., Arnett, K. L., Adams, E. J., Little, A. M., Tees, K., Barber, L. D., Marsh, S. G., Ohta, T., Markow, T., & Petzl-Erler, M. L. (1997). Episodic evolution and turnover of HLA-B in the indigenous human populations of the Americas. Tissue Antigens, 50(3), 219–232. https://doi.org/10.1111/j.1399-0039.1997.tb02866.x
- Tsuneto, L. T., Probst, C. M., Hutz, M. H., Salzano, F. M., Rodriguez-Delfin, L. A., Zago, M. A., Hill, K., Hurtado, A. M., Ribeiro-dos-Santos, A. K., & Petzl-Erler, M. L. (2003). HLA class II diversity in seven Amerindian populations. Clues about the origins of the Aché. Tissue Antigens, 62(6), 512–526. https://doi.org/10.1046/j.1399-0039.2003.00139.x
- Bortolini, M. C., Salzano, F. M., Thomas, M. G., Stuart, S., Nasanen, S. P., Bau, C. H., Hutz, M. H., Layrisse, Z., Petzl-Erler, M. L., Tsuneto, L. T., Hill, K., Hurtado, A. M., Castro-de-Guerra, D., Torres, M. M., Groot, H., Michalski, R., Nymadawa, P., Bedoya, G., Bradman, N., ... Ruiz-Linares, A. (2003). Y-chromosome evidence for differing ancient demographic histories in the Americas. American Journal of Human Genetics, 73(3), 524–539. https://doi.org/10.1086/377588
- Reich, D., Patterson, N., Campbell, D., Tandon, A., Mazieres, S., Ray, N., Parra, M. V., Rojas, W., Duque, C., Mesa, N., García, L. F., Triana, O., Blair, S., Maestre, A., Dib, J. C., Bravi, C. M., Bailliet, G., Corach, D., Hünemeier, T., ... Ruiz-Linares, A. (2012). Reconstructing Native American population history. Nature, 488(7411), 370–374. https://doi.org/10.1038/nature11258
- Augusto, D. G., Piovezan, B. Z., Tsuneto, L. T., Callegari-Jacques, S. M., & Petzl-Erler, M. L. (2013). KIR gene content in Amerindians indicates influence of demographic factors. PLoS One, 8(2), e56755. https://doi.org/10.1371/journal.pone.0056755
- Petzl-Erler, M. L., & Santamaria, J. (1989). Are HLA class II genes controlling susceptibility and resistance to Brazilian pemphigus foliaceus (fogo selvagem)? Tissue Antigens, 33(3), 408–414. https://doi.org/10.1111/j.1399-0039.1989.tb01684.x
- Pavoni, D. P., Roxo, V. M., Marquart Filho, A., & Petzl-Erler, M. L. (2003). Dissecting the associations of endemic pemphigus foliaceus (Fogo Selvagem) with HLA-DRB1 alleles and genotypes. Genes and Immunity, 4(2), 110–116. https://doi.org/10.1038/sj.gene.6363939
