= Maria Luiza Boulevard =

Boulevard in Sofia, Bulgaria

Coordinates: 42°42′5.92″N 23°19′22.25″E

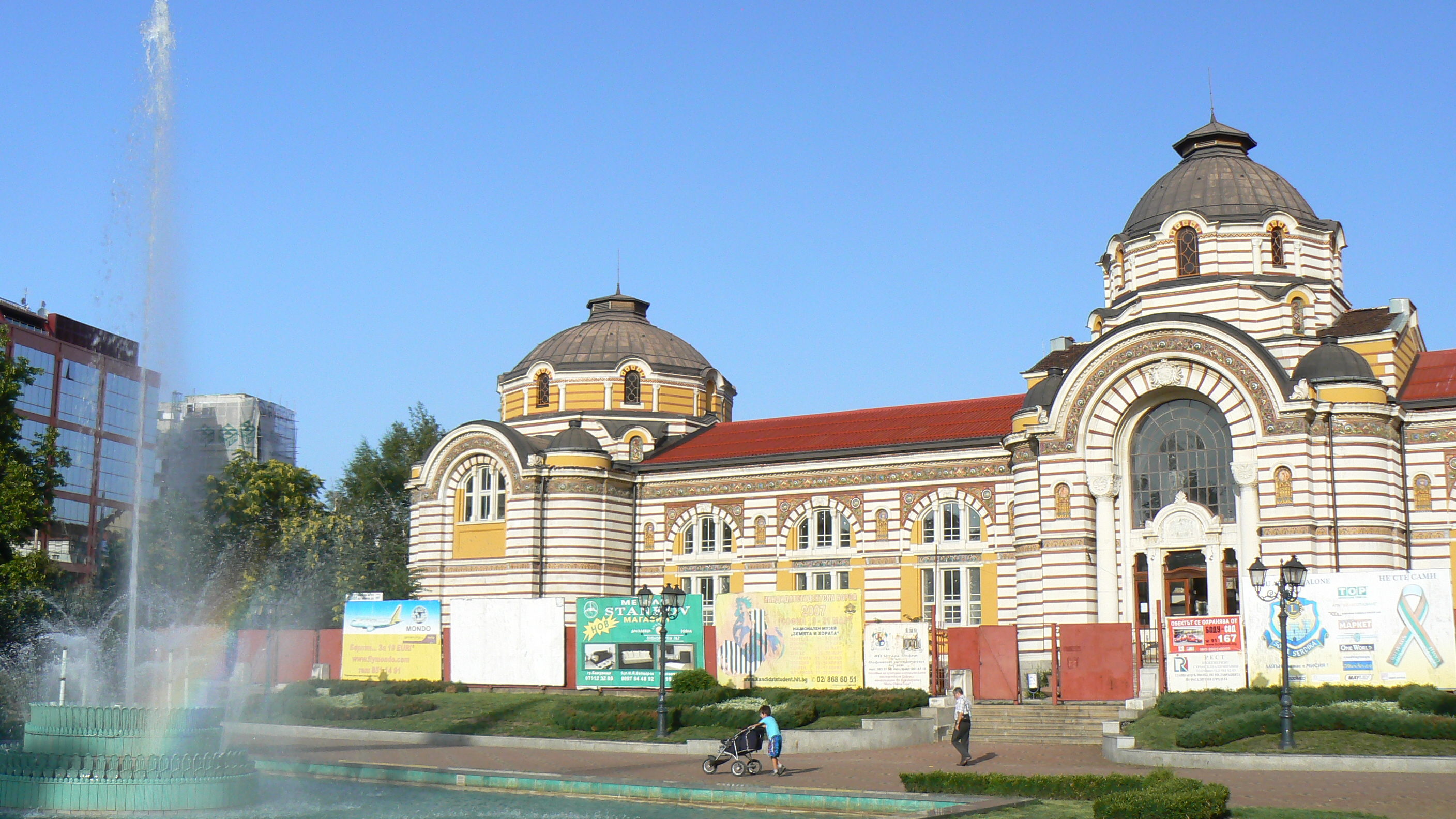
Sofia History Museum on Maria Luiza Boulevard, housed in the former Sofia Central Mineral Baths building

Maria Luiza Boulevard (Bulgarian: Булевард Мария Луиза), also called Maria Luiza, which is the Bulgarian transliteration of Marie Louise, is a central boulevard in Sofia. It connects Central Railway Station and Vitosha Boulevard which is its continuation to the National Palace of Culture. The boulevard passes over one of the city's most emblematic bridges, Lavov Most (meaning Lion's Bridge). It is named after Marie Louise of Bourbon-Parma, princess-consort of Bulgaria and wife to Ferdinand I. During communist period the boulevard was named after Georgi Dimitrov.

Many landmarks are situated on the Marie Louise Boulevard or in the vicinity. On the boulevard itself are located the Central Sofia Market Hall, St Nedelya Church, and Sofia Bathhouse. Close to Marie Louise are administrative and governmental edifices such as the Presidency, the Counsel of Ministers, the offices of the deputies (which form the Largo), the yellow-paved Prince Alexander of Battenberg Square and others. The newly opened Knyaginya Maria Luiza Metro Station is located on the road.

== Gallery ==
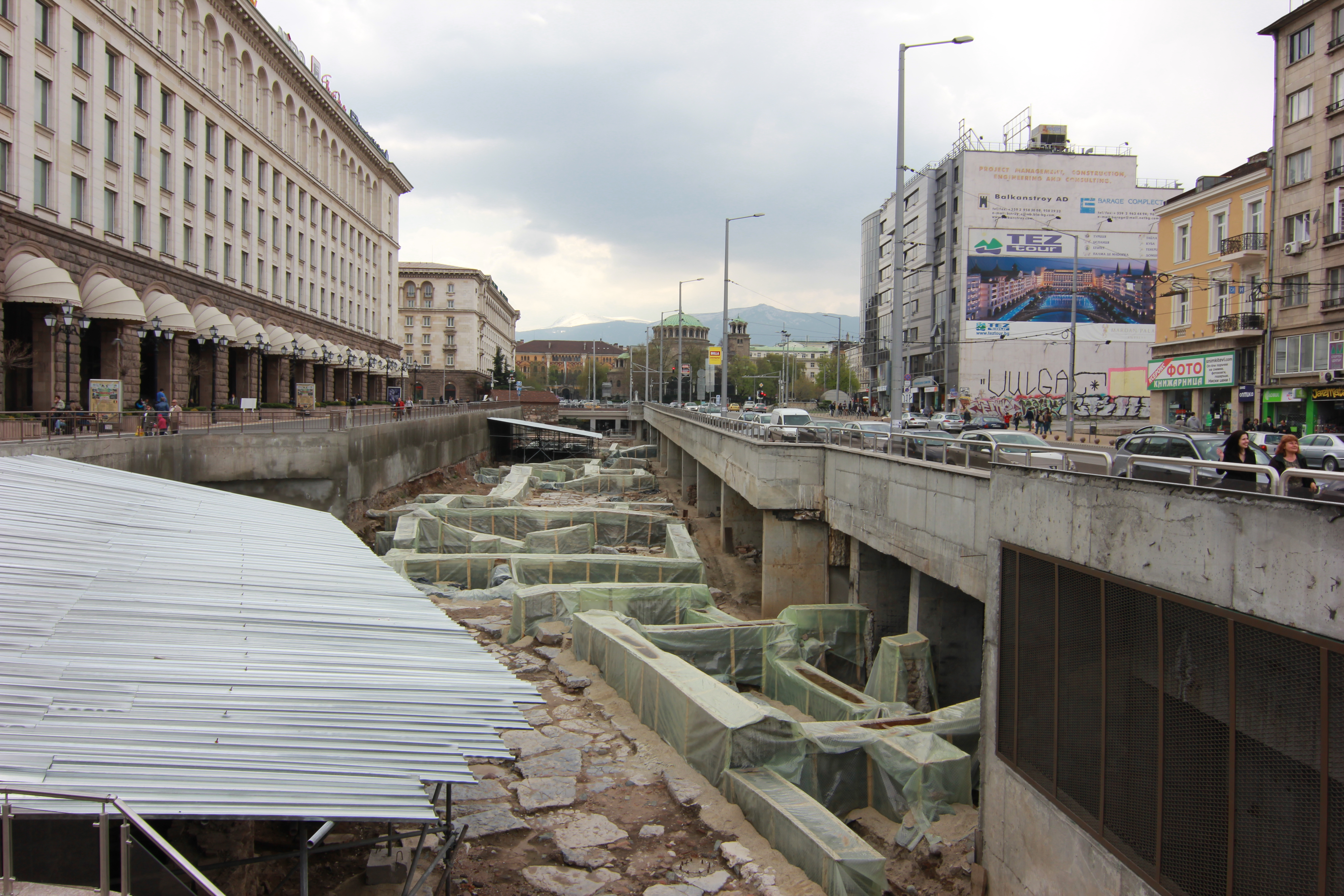
Maria Luiza Boulevard with St Nedelya Church and Sheraton Sofia Hotel Balkan in front, and TZUM on the Left, and current archaeological excavations along the street

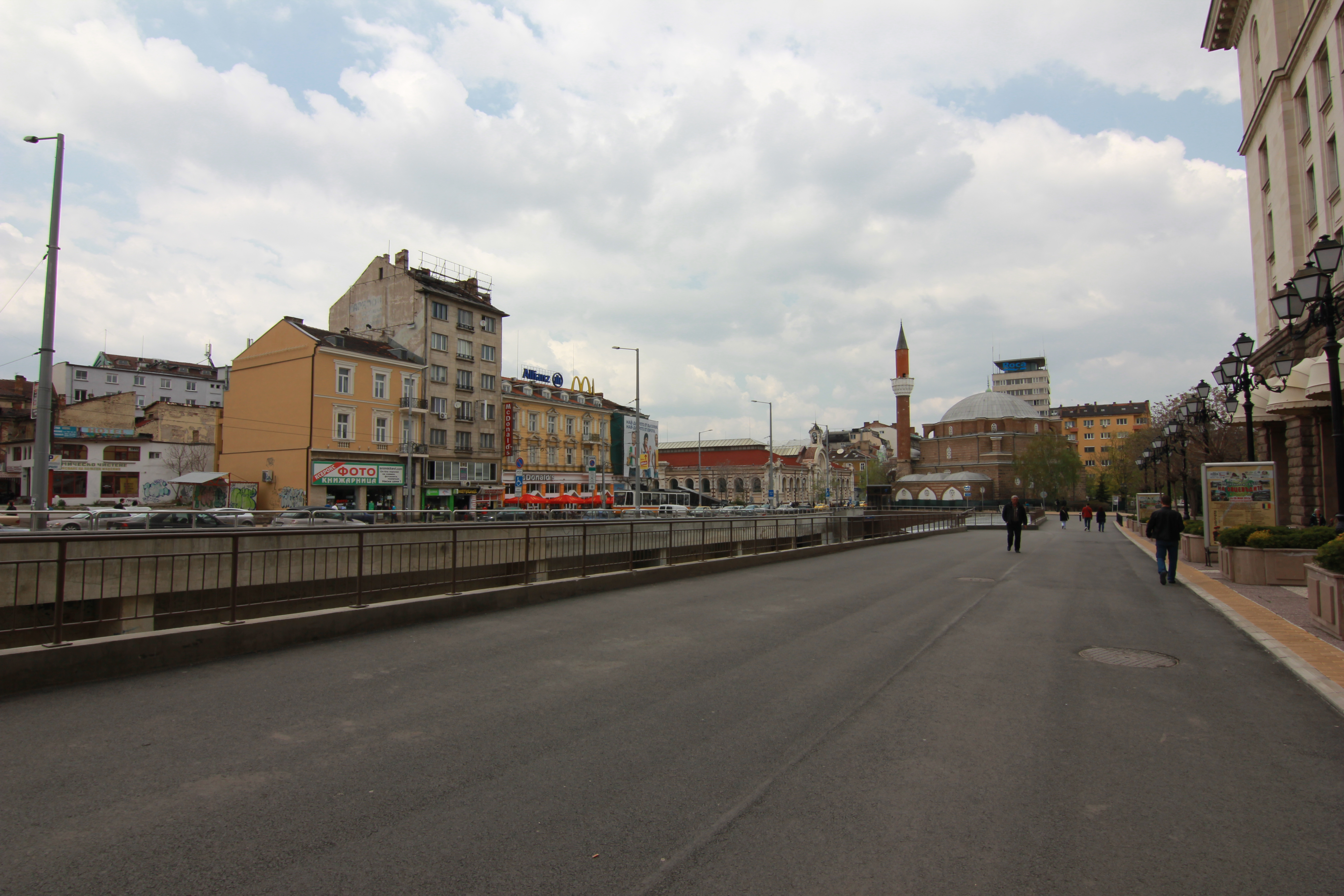
Maria Luiza Boulevard with Banya Bashi Mosque in front

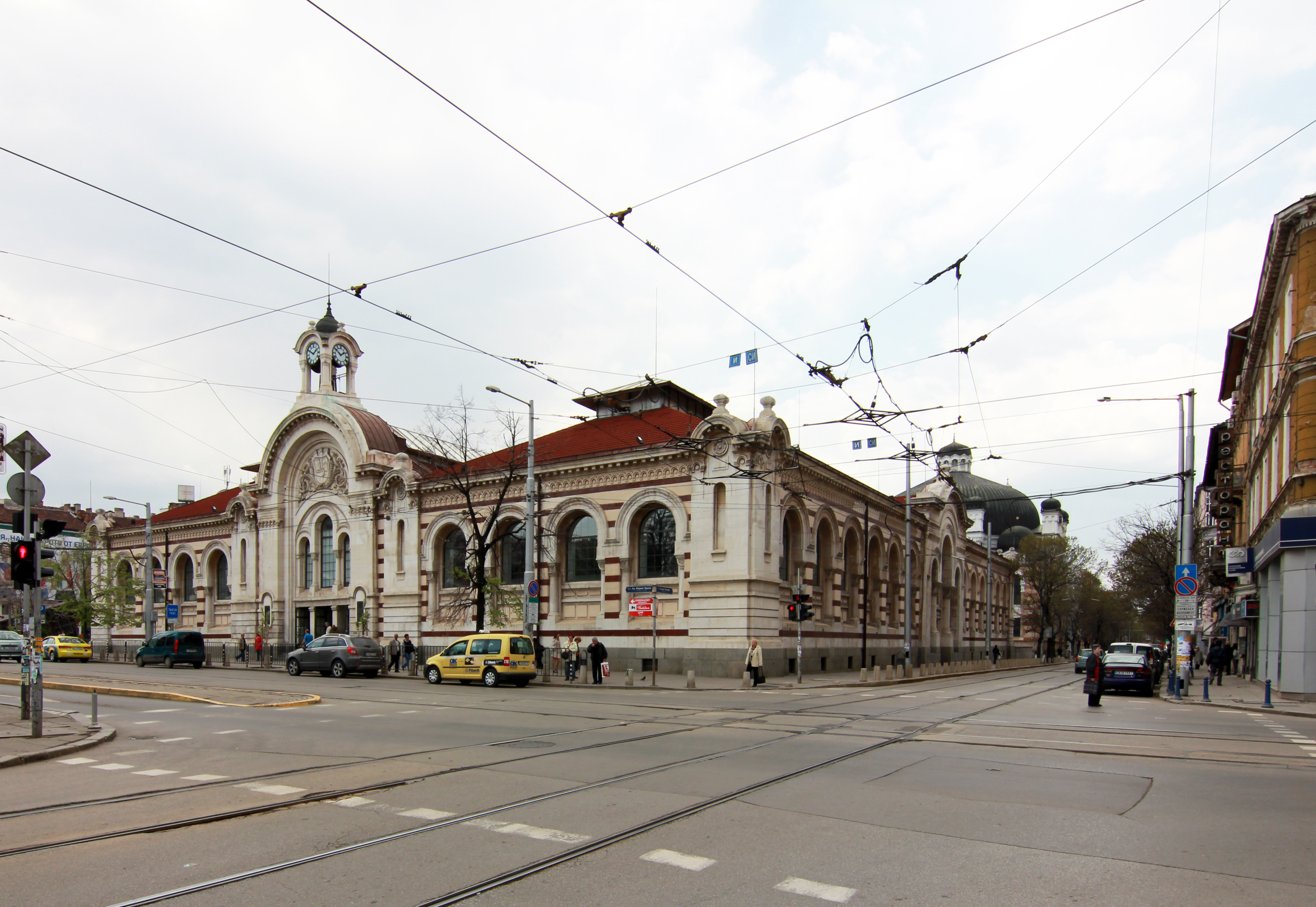
Maria Luiza Boulevard with Central Sofia Market Hall and the Sofia Synagogue behind it
