= Obelya Metro Station =

Sofia metro station

Obelya Обеля
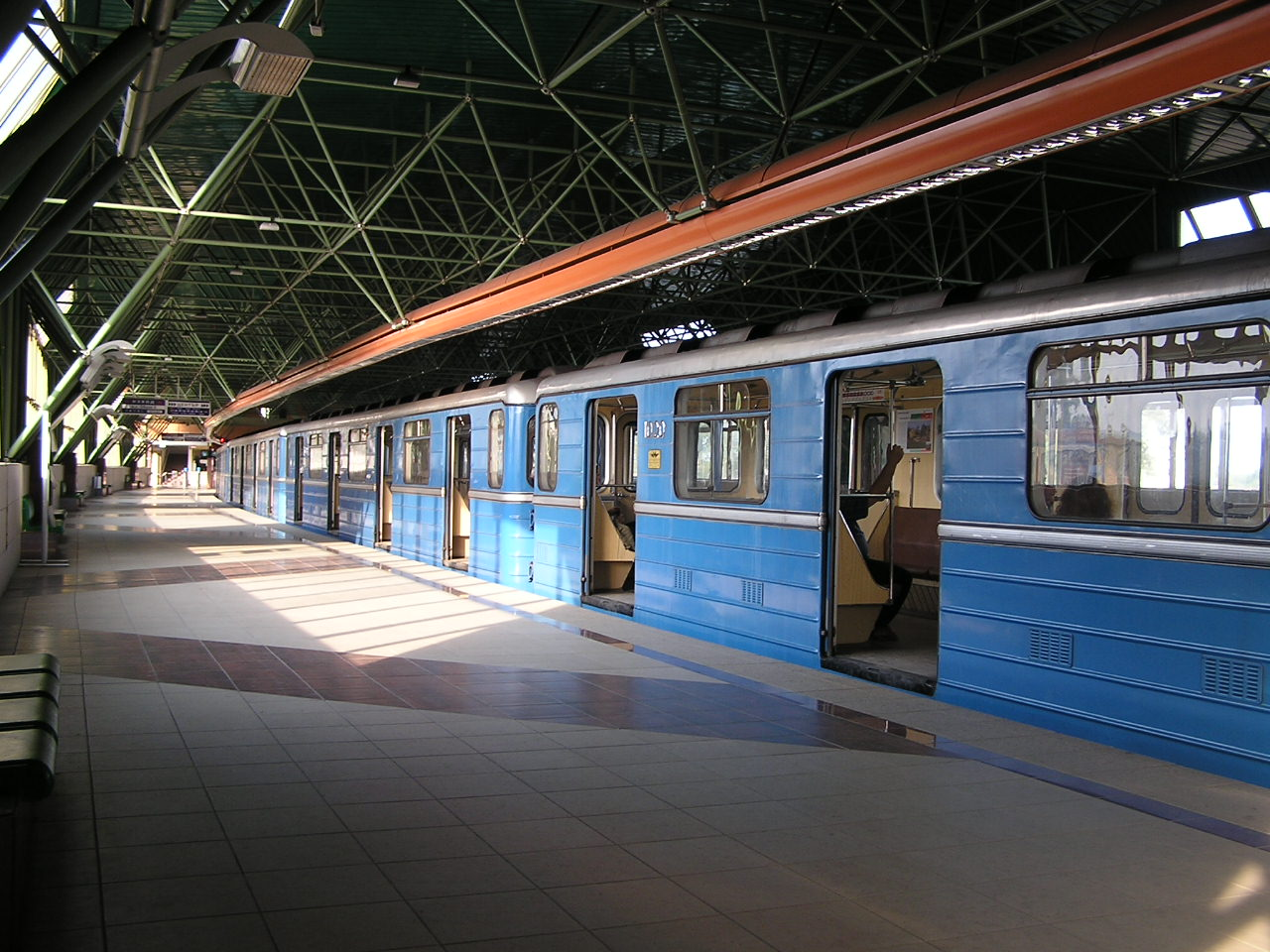
- The metro station platform, 2007.

General information
- Location: 1387 Obelya 1, Sofia
- Coordinates: 42°44′27″N 23°16′35″E
- Owner: Sofia Municipality
- Operator: Metropoliten JSC
- Platforms: side
- Tracks: 2
- Bus routes: 6
- Connections
- Tram: 6
- Bus: 26, 30, 31 ,81, 150, N2

Construction
- Structure type: overground on a bridge
- Platform levels: 2
- Parking: no
- Cycle facilities: yes
- Accessible: an elevator to platforms
- Architect: Krasen Andreev; Detelin Mushev

Other information
- Status: Staffed
- Station code: 2999; 3000
- Website: Official website

History
- Opened: 20 April 2003

Services
Preceding station	Sofia Metro	Following station
Lomsko shose towards Vitosha	M2 line	Terminus
Suspended services
Preceding station	Sofia Metro	Following station
Lomsko shose towards Vitosha	M2 line	through to M4 line
through to M2 line	M4 line	Slivnitsa towards Sofia Airport
Future services
Preceding station	Sofia Metro	Following station
Lomsko shose towards Vitosha	M2 line	Pancho Vladigerov Opening 2026 Terminus
Location

Obelya Metro Station (Bulgarian: Метростанция „Обеля“) is a station on the Sofia Metro in Bulgaria. It opened on 20 April 2003 as part of the M1 line. On this station M2 line trains from Vitosha Metro Station continue operation as M4 line trains towards Sofia Airport.

== Interchange with other public transport ==
- Tramway service: 6
- Bus service: 26, 30, 31, 81, 150, N2
