= Vitosha Metro Station =

Sofia metro station

Vitosha Витоша
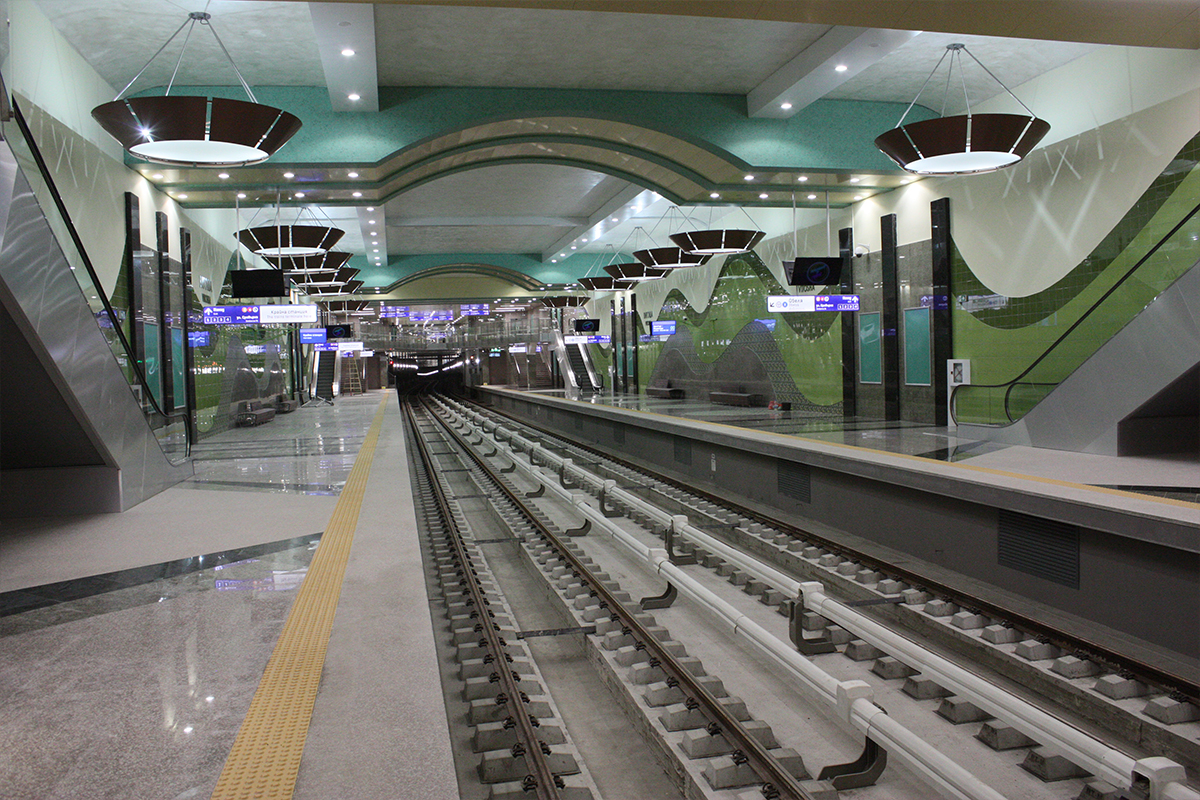

General information
- Location: 1407 Hladilnika, Sofia
- Coordinates: 42°39′29″N 23°18′58.5″E
- Owner: Sofia Municipality
- Operator: Metropoliten JSC
- Platforms: side
- Tracks: 2
- Bus routes: 9
- Connections
- Tram: 10, 15
- Bus: 64, 66, 68, 73, 83, 88, 98, X9, 120

Construction
- Structure type: sub-surface
- Platform levels: 2
- Parking: no
- Cycle facilities: yes
- Accessible: yes
- Architect: Irena Delripanska

Other information
- Status: Staffed
- Station code: 2975; 2976
- Website: Official website

History
- Opened: 20 July 2016

Passengers
- 2020: 570,000

Services
Preceding station	Sofia Metro	Following station
Terminus	M2 line	James Bourchier towards Obelya
Location

Vitosha Metro Station (Bulgarian: Метростанция „Витоша“) is a station on the Sofia Metro in Bulgaria, named after Vitosha mountain. It opened on 20 July 2016.

== Location ==
The station is located in Hladilnika district, just next to Paradise Center, the largest shopping mall in Bulgaria, to which it is connected by an underpass. Hladilnika bus station, located nearby, serves several suburban bus lines to Vitosha mountain.

== Architecture ==
The interest of mountaineers in the station determines its design, which is entirely inspired by the mountain and creates the feeling of a celebration of nature. Travelers on the platform fall in minutes among the hills of the mountain through the three-dimensional effect achieved by combining natural stone in warm gray and granite slabs in two shades of green - bolder and brighter for close-ups and darker and muted for distant. Colorful meadows in the pavement are formed with basalt flower mosaic.

The materials of the station are a combination of natural and artificial stone. The floors of the two lobbies and the platform are made of colored granite and granitogres. The walls are a combination of granite, granitogres and mineral plaster. The ceiling is made of "etalbond" composite material and colored mineral plaster. The stairs are made entirely of granite steps and the railings are made of stainless steel. Impressive lighting fixtures adorn the platform.

== Interchange with other public transport ==
- Tramway service: 10, 15
- Bus service: 64, 66, 68, 73, 83, 88, 98, X9, 120

== Gallery ==
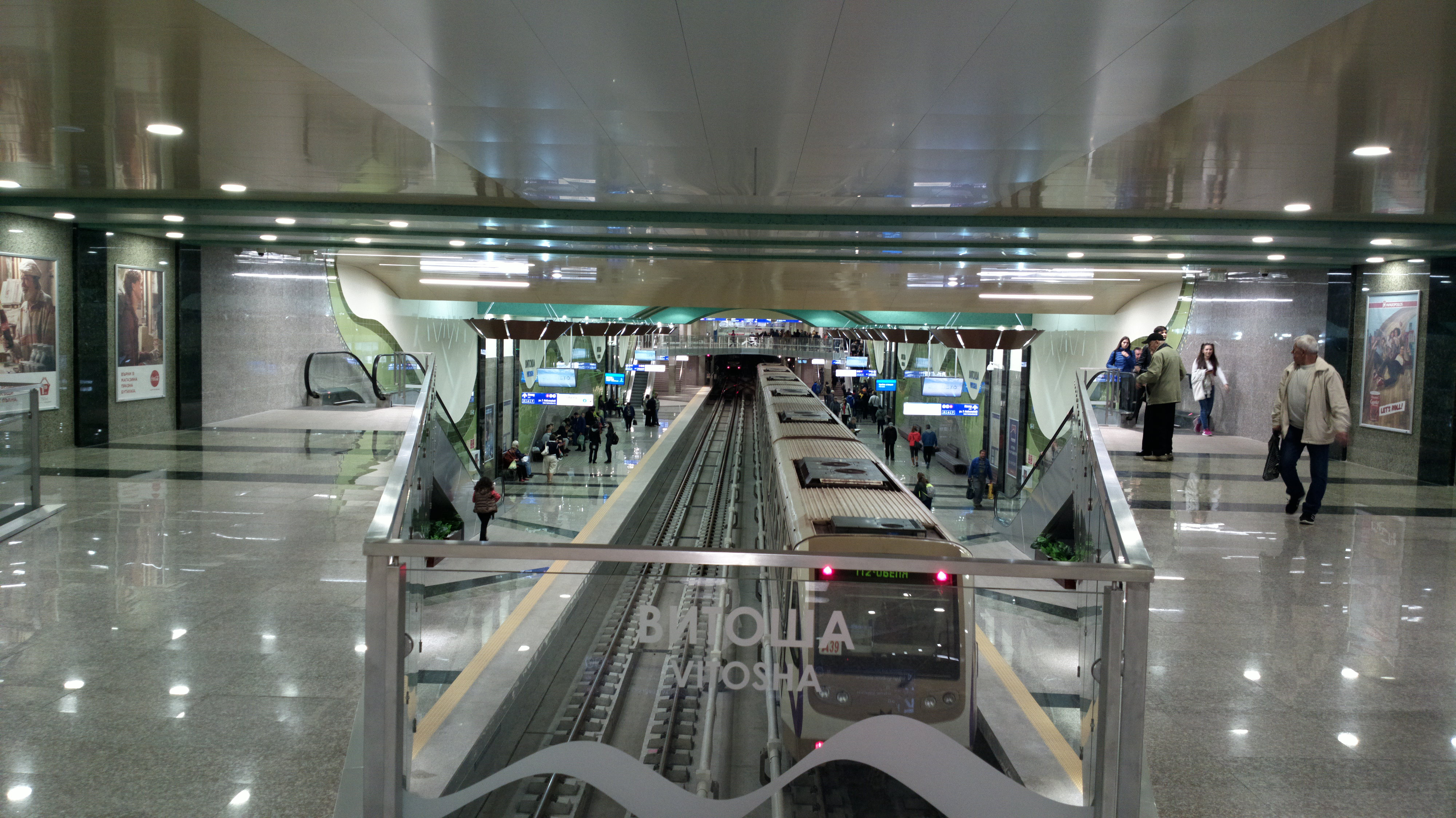
