= List of tourist attractions in Sofia =

Sofia's tourist attractions include:

== Churches ==
| Church | Description | Picture |
|---|---|---|
| Church of St George | The Church of St George is a late Roman rotunda dated from 4th century situated in the courtyard of the Sheraton Sofia Hotel. It was constructed with red bricks and is considered the oldest building in Sofia. It is known for its Medieval frescoes in the central dome dating from the 12-14th centuries. | |
| Church of St Sophia | The early Byzantine Church of St Sophia was built in the 6th century on the place of an ancient Roman theatre and several earlier churches. During the Second Bulgarian Empire the structure served as the cathedral of the city but was later converted to a mosque by the Ottoman Empire. | |
| Boyana Church | The Boyana Church is a medieval Bulgarian Orthodox church situated on the outskirts of Sofia, the capital of Bulgaria, in the Boyana quarter. The monument was added to the UNESCO World Heritage List in 1979. | |
| St. Sedmochislenitsi Church | It was created between 1901 and 1902 through the conversion of an abandoned Ottoman mosque, and was inaugurated on 27 July 1903.The so-called Black Mosque was built in 1528 on the order of Suleiman the Magnificent with the intention to be more impressive and beautiful than the Christian churches in the city. The mosque is popularly attributed to the famous Ottoman architect Sinan, although this is uncertain. It was constructed at the place of a former nunnery of the Rila Monastery and an Early Christian temple from the 4th-5th century, the ruins of which were excavated in 1901. | |
| Alexander Nevsky Cathedral | The gold-domed Alexander Nevsky Cathedral was built in the early 20th century in memory of the 200,000 Russian, Ukrainian, Belarusian and Bulgarian soldiers, who died in the Russo-Turkish War, 1877–1878. It is one of the largest Eastern Orthodox cathedrals in the world. The cathedral's gold-plated dome is 45 m high, with the bell tower reaching 50.52 m. | |
| Church of St. Paraskeva | The church, dedicated to Saint Paraskeva, is located on 58 Georgi Rakovski Street in the centre of the city. It is the third-largest church in Sofia. The construction of the Church of St Paraskeva was complete by 1930, but the finishing works on the porticos did not cease until 1940. | |
| St Nedelya Church | St Nedelya is a medieval church that has suffered destruction through the ages and has been reconstructed many times. It was razed in the assault in 1925 that claimed over 150 victims. After the assault, the church was restored to its modern appearance. Today St Nedelya is a cathedral of the Sofia bishopric of the Bulgarian Patriarchate. | |
| Church of St Petka | The tiny Church of St Petka of the Saddlers from the 14th century featuring some fine frescoes. It is a one-nave edifice dedicated to St Petka, an 11th-century Bulgarian saint. | |
| Russian Church | The Russian Church or the Church of St. Nicholas the Miracle-Maker, built in 1914 is dedicated to the patron-saint of the Russian Tsar at the time Nicholas II. The construction was supervised by the architect A. Smirnov, who was building the Alexander Nevsky Cathedral nearby. | |

== Other places of worship ==
| Place | Description | Picture |
|---|---|---|
| Cathedral of St Joseph | The Cathedral of St Joseph is a Roman Catholic cathedral in Sofia. The cathedral, rebuilt at its previous location after it was destroyed by the Allied bombing raids during World War II, was inaugurated on 21 May 2006 in the presence of Angelo Cardinal Sodano, Dean of the College of Cardinals and Cardinal Secretary of State of the Roman Catholic Church. The foundation stone of the new cathedral was laid personally by Pope John Paul II during his visit to Bulgaria in 2002. | |
| Banya Bashi Mosque | Banya Bashi Mosque is a mosque in Sofia, Bulgaria. It is one of the oldest mosques in Europe, having been completed in 1576, during the years the Ottomans had control of the capital. | |
| Sofia Synagogue | The Sofia Synagogue is the largest synagogue in Southeastern Europe, one of two functioning in Bulgaria and one of the largest in Europe. The synagogue was officially opened on 9 September 1909. | |

== Museums and galleries ==
| Museum | Description | Picture |
|---|---|---|
| National Historical Museum | The National Historical Museum is among the largest museums in Eastern Europe and possess more than 650,000 artifacts. Ancient Thracian treasures, old armoury and weaponry, and medieval church plates are among the most valuable objects in the collection. | |
| National Archaeological Museum | The National Archaeological Museum occupies the largest and oldest former Ottoman mosque in the city built in 1474. It has a large collection of archaeological artifacts from all over the Balkans including some of the golden Thracian treasures. The museum is among Bulgaria's oldest and was inaugurated in 1905. | |
| National Museum of Military History | The National Military History Museum is a Bulgarian museum based in Sofia, the capital of Bulgaria, and dedicated to military history. | |
| Earth and Man National Museum | It's one of the biggest mineralogical museums in the world. It was founded on 30 December 1985 and opened for visitors on 19 June 1987. | |
| National Art Gallery | It is located on Battenberg Square in the capital city of Sofia, occupying most of the historic and imposing edifice of the former royal palace of Bulgaria, having been established in 1934 and moved to the palace in 1946, after the abolition of the monarchy. | |
| National Gallery of Foreign Art | The National Gallery of Foreign Art occupies an imposing 19th-century building. The gallery's permanent exposition features European, Asian (Buddhist, Japanese and Indian) and African art, as well as separate contemporary art and engraving sections. | |
| National Museum of Natural History | The museum's collection includes over 400 stuffed mammals, over 1,200 species of birds, hundreds of thousands of insects and other invertebrata, as well as samples of about one quarter of the world's mineral species. Today's National Museum of Natural History was founded in 1889 as the Natural History Museum of Knyaz Ferdinand of Bulgaria. | |

== Education and sciences ==
| Place | Description | Picture |
|---|---|---|
| Bulgarian Academy of Sciences | The Bulgarian Academy of Sciences is the National Academy of Bulgaria, established in 1869. The academy is autonomous and has a Society of Academicians, Correspondent Members and Foreign Members. It publishes and circulates different scientific works, encyclopedias, dictionaries and journals, and runs its own publishing house. | |
| Sofia University | The St. Clement of Ohrid University of Sofia or Sofia University is the oldest higher education institution in Bulgaria, founded on 1 October 1888. The university's edifice was constructed between 1924 and 1934 with the financial support of the brothers Evlogi Georgiev and Hristo Georgiev, whose sculptures are now featured on its façade, and has an area of 18,624 m^{2} and a total of 324 premises. | |
| National Academy of Art | The National Academy of Art was founded in 1896 by the noted artists and public figures Ivan Mrkvička, Anton Mitov and Dr Ivan Shishmanov, who drafted a bill regarding the establishment of the State School of Drawing. | |
| Sofia Seminary | The Sofia Seminary's construction began in 1902, when Knyaz Ferdinand of Bulgaria laid the foundation stone together with the chairman of the Holy Synod, Metropolitan Simeon of Varna and Veliki Preslav, in the presence of ministers and other influential figures. The complex, designed by Austro-Hungarian architect Friedrich Grünanger, who united Eclecticism with elements of traditional Byzantine architecture, was completed towards the end of 1902 and inaugurated on 20 January 1903. The Seminary Church of St John of Rila, a one-naved cross-domed basilica, was opened on 26 October 1904, St Demetrius' Day. | |

== Miscellaneous places of culture ==
| Place | Description | Picture |
|---|---|---|
| Ivan Vazov National Theatre | The Ivan Vazov National Theatre is Bulgaria's national theatre, as well as the oldest and most authoritative theatre in the country and one of the important landmarks of Sofia, the capital of Bulgaria. | |
| Central Military Club | The Central Military Club is a multi-purpose monument of culture building in the centre of Sofia, the capital of Bulgaria, located on Tsar Osvoboditel Boulevard and Georgi Rakovski Street. It serves the Bulgarian Army and is administered by the Executive Agency of Military Clubs and Information. | |
| National Opera and Ballet | The first opera company in Bulgaria was founded in 1890 as part of the Capital Opera and Drama Company. The National Opera and Ballet's building was designed in 1921 and mostly built between 1947 and 1953, when it was opened. | |
| SS. Cyril and Methodius National Library | Founded on 4 April 1878, the library received the status of Bulgarian National Library three years later and the Bulgarian National Revival Archive was merged into it in 1924. | |
| Slaveykov Square | The outdoor book-market on Slaveykov Square. | |
| National Palace of Culture | The National Palace of Culture cultural and congressional centre — the largest multifunctional complex in Southeastern Europe, inaugurated in 1981 and situated in a lush green park surroundings. | |

== Administrative places ==
| Place | Description | Picture |
|---|---|---|
| National Assembly of Bulgaria | The National Assembly of Bulgaria was established in 1879 with the Constitution of Bulgaria. | |
| Sofia Court House | The need for a common building to house all the courts in Sofia was raised in 1926 with the foundation of the Judicial Buildings fund. Construction began in 1929 and finished in 1940. | |
| Ministry of Agriculture and Forestry | It was founded as the Ministry of Agriculture and State Property on 24 July 1911, when it was separated from the Ministry of Commerce and Agriculture. | |

== Tombs and monuments ==
| Place | Description | Picture |
|---|---|---|
| Battenberg Mausoleum | The Memorial Tomb of Alexander I of Battenberg, better known as the Battenberg Mausoleum in Sofia, the capital of Bulgaria, is the mausoleum and final resting place of Prince Alexander I of Bulgaria (1857–1893), the first Head of State of modern Bulgaria. | |
| Monument to Vasil Levski | The bronze bas-relief of the head of Vasil Levski, part of the monument, was created by Josef Strachovský, whereas Italian Abramo Peruchelli did the stonecutting work. It was inaugurated on 22 October 1895, but was planned and worked on ever since the Liberation of Bulgaria in 1878, the construction being hindered by a chronic lack of funds and negligence, and taking a whole 17 years. | |
| Monument to the Tsar Liberator | The Monument to the Tsar Liberator is an equestrian monument in the centre of Sofia, the capital of Bulgaria. It was erected in honour of Russian Emperor Alexander II who liberated Bulgaria of Ottoman rule during the Russo-Turkish War of 1877–78. | |
| Monument to the Unknown Soldier, Sofia | The Monument to the Unknown Soldier features an eternal flame, turf from Stara Zagora and Shipka Pass, sites of two of the most important battles of the Russo-Turkish War of Liberation. | |
| Russian Monument | The Russian Monument is a monument in Sofia, the capital of Bulgaria. The first monument to be built in the capital of the newly liberated Principality of Bulgaria, it was unveiled on 29 June 1882 and is located on the road which Osman Nuri Paşa used to flee from Sofia to Pernik on 22 December 1877 | |
| Monument to the Soviet Army | The Monument to the Soviet Army was built in 1954. | |

== Shopping malls ==
| Mall | Description | Picture |
|---|---|---|
| TZUM | The store's construction began in 1955 and ended in the end of 1956, when the first customers entered TZUM. It was officially opened with a ceremony in 1957. The edifice was designed by architect Kosta Nikolov and has an area of 20,570 m^{2}. It features a covered inner yard taking up the centre of five of the building's seven floors. | |
| Mall of Sofia | The mall is four stories tall and has a total of 70,000 m^{2} of built-up area, of which 35,000 m^{2} belong to the commercial and entertainment sector and 10,000 m^{2} are offices, while the underground parking lot takes up 22,000 m^{2} and has a capacity of 700 vehicles. The remainder of 8,000 m^{2} is occupied by service and common areas. | |
| City Center Sofia | The mall six stories and a total built-up area of 44,000 m^{2}. There are more than 100 stores, several cafes, a pharmacy, beauty parlors, bank offices and parking lots. There are also two hypermarkets presented in the mall: Technomarket and Picadilly. The cinema complex "Cineplex" has six halls with a total of 1,340 seats. | |
| Sky City Mall | The mall disposes of 26,000 m^{2} of shopping area, a 300-place ground and underground parking lot. It has a large entertainment zone which includes a two-level bowling hall, several billiards halls, snooker tables, darts, an Internet cafe and others. It also offers a wide variety of shops for clothing, shoes, jewellery, furniture, terracotta, faience and all sorts of goods. There are mobile operators offices, bank offices, dry cleaner's, locksmith and other services. | |
| The Mall | The Mall, Sofia, is the largest shopping mall in Bulgaria. Opened in spring 2010 by Prime Minister Boyko Borisov, the Mall has a total built area of 65,000 square metres (700,000 sq ft) on six storeys, three of which are underground. It contains 185 shops, restaurants, recreations centres, bars, cafeterias and parking capacity for more than 2,800 vehicles. Bulgaria's largest Carrefour hypermarket at 9,000 square metres (97,000 sq ft) is within the Mall. The Mall can be found at 115 Tsarigradsko Shose. | |
| Serdika Center Sofia | Serdika Center Sofia is a shopping mall located in Sofia, Bulgaria, opened in the spring of 2010 and has more than 210 stores. Serdika Center Sofia is located on Sitnyakovo Boulevard, more specifically at the corner of Sitnyakovo Boulevard and Oborishte street, in the municipality of Oborishte. The shopping mall is only 5 minutes drive from Sofia's main motorway Trakiya, 10 minutes from Sofia Airport and 10 minutes from the central part of Sofia. It is one of the largest shopping malls on Southeastern Europe. | |
| Sofia Outlet Center | Sofia Outlet Center is a shopping mall located in Sofia, Bulgaria, opened in the spring of 2010. The Mall is located on an established retail development, next to Technomarket and METRO Cash and Carry and opposite the EXPO Center in just 15 min driving distance from the heart of the city. On April 25, 2012, the new metro station Tsarigradsko shose was opened in front of the Sofia Outlet Center. | |
| Bulgaria Mall | Bulgaria Mall was officially opened on 1 December 2012. It is positioned at the intersection of two of the most significant Sofia's boulevards – Bulgaria boulevard and Todor Kableshkov boulevard. The Mall is developed as part of a mixed-use retail and office project with approximately 130,000 m2 of total build-up area. The office part, consists of an office high-rise tower and an office building, exceeds 25,000 m2 of lettable area. The Mall has one of the biggest skylights in Central and Eastern Europe. | |
| Paradise Center | Paradise Center in Sofia, Bulgaria is the largest mall in Bulgaria and Southeastern Europe based on gross leasable area. It opened doors on 28 March 2013. The mall is a huge investment project, with main investor Bulfeld, Sofia and construction company Comfort, Varna. The building is located in Hladilnika neighbourhood near The South Park. The infrastructure in the area is currently being upgraded by expanding series of streets, boulevards and subway systems. In the next two years a subway station will be available there. | |
| Mega Mall Sofia | Mega Mall Sofia is located in the western part of Sofia. The mall is located on the intersection on Boulevard Tsaritsa Yoanna and Boulevard Dobrinova Skala. The four-story shopping complex with over 24,000 sq m usable space includes a hypermarket and more than 100 stores ranging from fashion, accessories, beauty services, jewelry, books and music to cafes and restaurants. The Mega Mall opened for business in December 2014. | |
| Sofia Ring Mall | Sofia Ring Mall is a shopping mall in Sofia. It has a total built area of 69,000 square metres and is located on the Sofia ring road, from which it takes its name. It opened in December 2014. | |
| Plaza West | Plaza West will be a shopping mall in Sofia. It has a total built area of 37,750 square metres and is located on the Sofia's west ring road. The Mall opened in December 2014. | |

== Gardens and parks ==
| Place | Description | Picture |
|---|---|---|
| Borisova gradina | In 1882, the then-mayor of Sofia Ivan Hadzhienov brought Swiss gardener Daniel Neff from Bucharest with the intention to create a garden for the capital of Bulgaria. The mayor's initial plans included first establishing a large nursery where trees, shrubs and flowers for the future garden would grow, also providing material for the already existing gardens and for the streets | |
| City Garden | The City Garden is Sofia's oldest and most central public garden, in existence since 1872. It is located between Tsar Osvoboditel Boulevard to the north, Knyaz Alexander Battenberg Street to the west and Joseph Vladimirovich Gourko Street to the south, in the historical centre of the city. | |
| Vitosha park and mountain | Vitosha mountain, one of the symbols of Sofia, just a short drive or lift trip away, open year-round. Ski and snowboard are popular in the winter, and hiking in the summer. | |

== Other places of interest ==
| Place | Description | Picture |
|---|---|---|
| The Market Hall | The construction of the building, which spreads over 3,200 m^{2}, began in 1909 after the project of architect Naum Torbov was chosen in 1907, and took two years to complete. The style of the building, which is regarded as Torbov's best work, is Neo-Renaissance, featuring also elements of Neo-Byzantine architecture and Neo-Baroque. | |
| Sofia Public Mineral Baths | This is decorated with majolica tiles and was completed in 1911. | |
| The Largo | This is an architectural complex in downtown Sofia which includes the headquarters of many national institutions. | |
| Vrana Palace | Vrana Palace is a former royal palace, located on the outskirts of Sofia, the capital of Bulgaria. It is today the official residence of the deposed Tsar Simeon II of Bulgaria and his wife Tsaritsa Margarita. While the Royal palace in the centre of Sofia (today the National Art Gallery and National Ethnographic Museum) served representative purposes and the Euxinograd palace near Varna was a summer residence, Vrana was the palace where the royal family of Bulgaria spent most of their time. | |
| Yablanski House | The Yablanski House was built in 1906–1907 to the designs of Austro-Hungarian architect Friedrich Grünanger (1856–1929) on the order of the wealthy financier and former mayor of Sofia Dimitar Yablanski (1859–1924). | |
| The yellow paveds | Sofia's central boulevards paved with Viennese yellow cobblestones. | |
| Sofia Zoo | The Sofia Zoo was founded in 1888, has an area of 230,000 m^{2} and, houses 1,113 animals representing 244 species. | |
| Lion's Bridge | Lavov Most is a bridge over the Vladaya River in the centre of Sofia, the capital of Bulgaria, built 1889–1891 by Czech architect Václav Prošek, his brother Jozef and his cousins Bohdan and Jiří. | |
| Eagle's Bridge | Orlov Most (Bulgarian: Орлов мост, meaning "Eagle's Bridge") is a bridge over the Perlovska River in the centre of Sofia, the capital of Bulgaria. It gives the name to the important and busy juncture at which it is located. | |
| The ancient fortress of Serdica | | |
| Amphitheatre of Serdica | The Amphitheatre of Serdica was an amphitheater in the Roman city of Serdica, now Sofia. | |
| Borisova Gradina TV Tower | The old TV Tower is 106 metres tall. It was designed by architect Lyuben Podponev, engineer A. Voynov and technologist Georgi Kopkanov. Construction began in December 1958 and the tower was officially opened on 26 December 1959. It has an area of 144 m^{2} and 14 floors. | |
