= TZUM =

Tzum is a village in the Netherlands.

TSUM may refer to:

- TsUM (Moscow), a Russian department store
- TZUM (Sofia), a Bulgarian department store

== See also ==
- Tsum (disambiguation)
