= Triaditsa =

Triaditsa may refer to:

- Triaditsa (medieval city), the name of the city built by Justinian the Great (527-565) located in today's Sofia
- Triaditsa, Sofia, an district of the city of Sofia
