= Tsum =

Tsum or TSUM may refer to:

- Tsum language, a Tibetic language of Nepal
- TsUM Kyiv, a Ukrainian department store
- TsUM (Almaty), a Kazakh department store
- TsUM (Moscow), a Russian department store
- TZUM (Sofia), a Bulgarian department store

== See also ==
- Disney Tsum Tsum, a series of toys
- Tzum, a village in the Netherlands
