= Paradise Center =

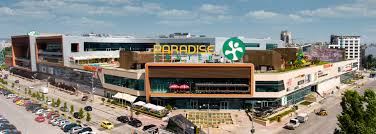
- Location: Sofia, Bulgaria
- Coordinates: 42°39′28″N 23°18′52″E
- Opened: 28 March 2014
- Owner: NEPI Rockcastle
- Num. of stores: 330+
- Floor area: 80,000 m^{2} (860,000 sq ft)
- Public transit: Vitosha, buses, trams
- Website: paradise-center.com

Paradise Center in Sofia, Bulgaria is the largest mall in Bulgaria. It opened doors on 28 March 2013. The main investors are Bulfeld, Sofia and construction company Comfort, Varna. The building is located in Hladilnika neighbourhood near the South Park. The infrastructure in the area is currently being upgraded by expanding of several boulevards and the metro system. Vitosha Metro Station of Sofia Metro line 2 has been servicing the shopping mall since July 2016.

== Overview ==
The mall is located in a heavily populated part of the city, construction has since caused congestion to increase considerably in the immediate vicinity. The mall is the biggest in the country and one of the biggest in the whole Central and Eastern Europe. In 2017 it was sold for 253 million euros to NEPI Rockcastle.

== Zones ==
Paradise Center has four zones in terms of interior design – the boulevard, the canyon, the terrace and the garden differentiating from each other with diverse concept and style.

- The core of the project is a natural Garden with two waterfalls and a lake with a bridge, although the water features were later removed. Located in the central atrium, the garden is illuminated with natural light. The panoramic elevator there connects the ground level with the other floors.
- The Boulevard in Paradise Center is in the form of a high street with a sidewalks, trees, small and large fashion stores, banks, pharmacies, jewelry and gift stores.
- The Canyon and the Terrace employ their own specific architectures.
- The second floor is the entertainment floor. A multiplex with 14 halls of the international brand Cinema City International and multiple restaurants with panoramic terraces together with a fast food area.
- The last, third floor, accommodates a fitness, spa center, squash and tennis halls. Some restaurants and bars are placed there.
- There was a theme park on the roof terrace, which was later removed.

== See also ==
- List of the world's largest shopping malls
- List of shopping malls in Sofia
- Capital Fort and Mall of Sofia, examples of other big construction projects in Sofia
