= Triaditsa, Sofia =

District of Sofia, Bulgaria

Triaditsa Триадица
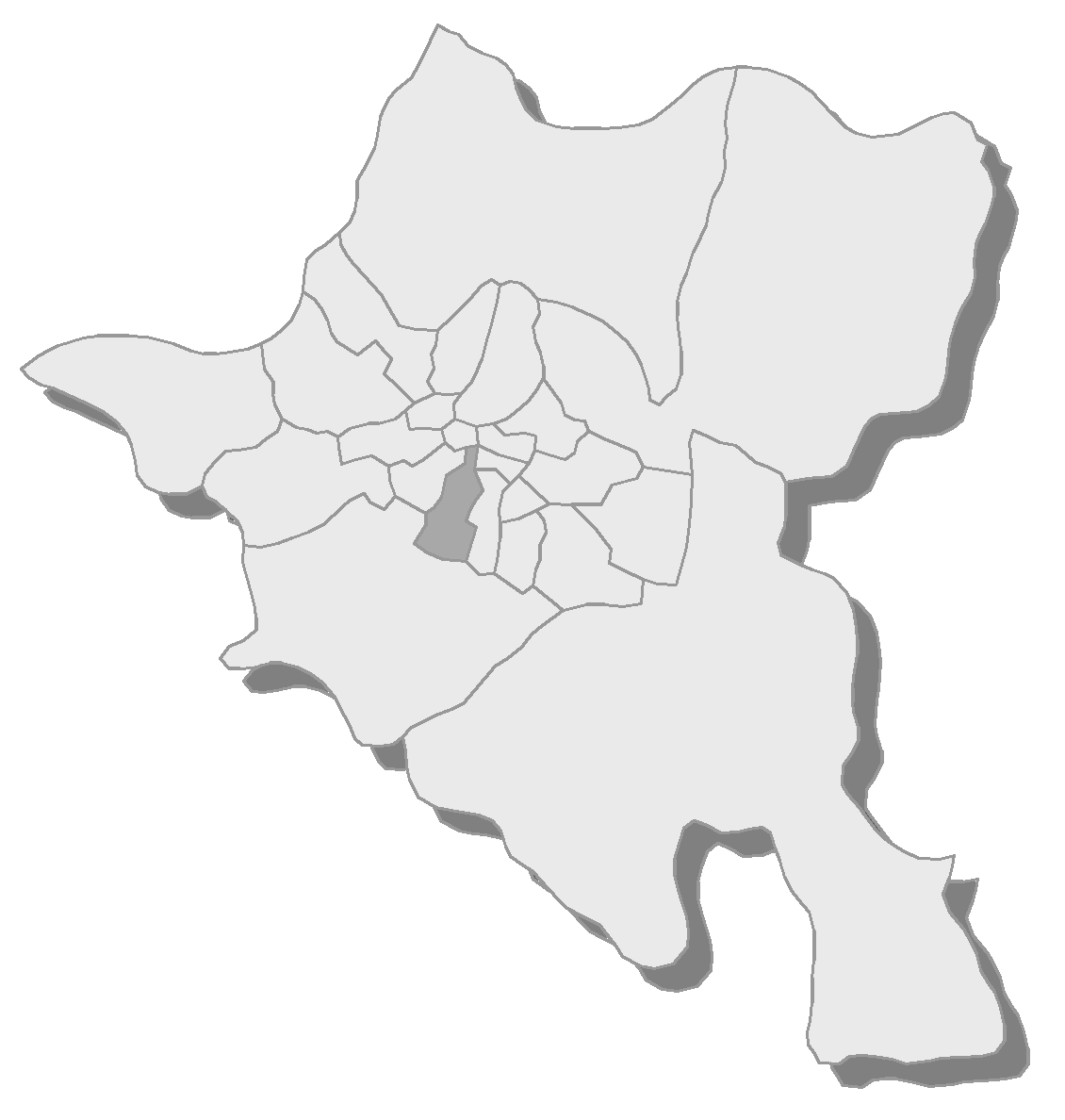
- Location of Triaditsa within Sofia
- Coordinates: 42°40′38″N 23°18′32″E
- Country: Bulgaria
- Province: Sofia City
- Municipality: Stolichna

Triaditsa (Bulgarian: Триадица [triˈ(j)adit͡sɐ]) is a district located in the southern parts of Sofia. As of 2006 the population is 65,000. The district has an area of 9,8 km^{2}. It includes three neighbourhoods: "Ivan Vazov", "Strelbishte" and "Gotse Delchev".

== Economy ==
Triaditsa has a prosperous economy. The unemployment is only 3,7% which is more the two times smaller than the national average. There are no manufacturing plants in the territory of the district so the economy relies on services, trade, finance, tourism and administration. City Center Sofia Mall is located in the north-eastern edge of "Ivan Vazov" neighbourhood between Hilton Hotel Sofia and Hotel Hemus.Triaditsa Region is attractive for investments, especially Manastirski livadi. Along Bulgaria boulevard there are impressive office-centers with modern facades. The infrastructure is currently under development.

== Education and healthcare ==
There are 12 schools, 10 kindergartens and 4 chitalishta.

Many important medical facilities are located there including the Medical-Military Academy, Hygiene Centre, Dental Institute, Children Paedriatics; the hospitals "Alexandrovska", "Prof. Ivan Kirov", "Sv. Ekarerina", "Maichin Dom" and "Sv. Sofia". There are three polyclinics as well.

== Culture ==
The National Palace of Culture (NDK) is located to the north, situated among a pleasant park with a small chapel and with many fountains. It is the largest congress centre in South Eastern Europe. There are four churches and five police stations. The Earth and Man National Museum is located in the park to the south of NDK.
