= DeFacto (retailer) =

Turkish retail clothing company

DeFacto Perakende A.Ş
- Industry: Apparel retailing and manufacturing
- Founded: 2003
- Founder: Zeki Cemal Özen
- Headquarters: Halkalı Merkez^{(tr)}, Küçükçekmece, Istanbul, Turkey
- Number of locations: c. 500
- Key people: İhsan Ateş (CEO)
- Products: Clothing
- Revenue: US$1.05 billion (2023)
- Number of employees: c. 13.000
- Website: corporate.defacto.com.tr

DeFacto is a Turkish retail clothing company founded in 2003. It is the second-largest clothing company in Turkey, active in 30+ countries and operating with nearly 500 stores globally.

Based in the Halkalı Merkez neighborhood of Küçükçekmece, Istanbul, the company's official name is DeFacto Perakende Ticaret A.Ş.

== History ==
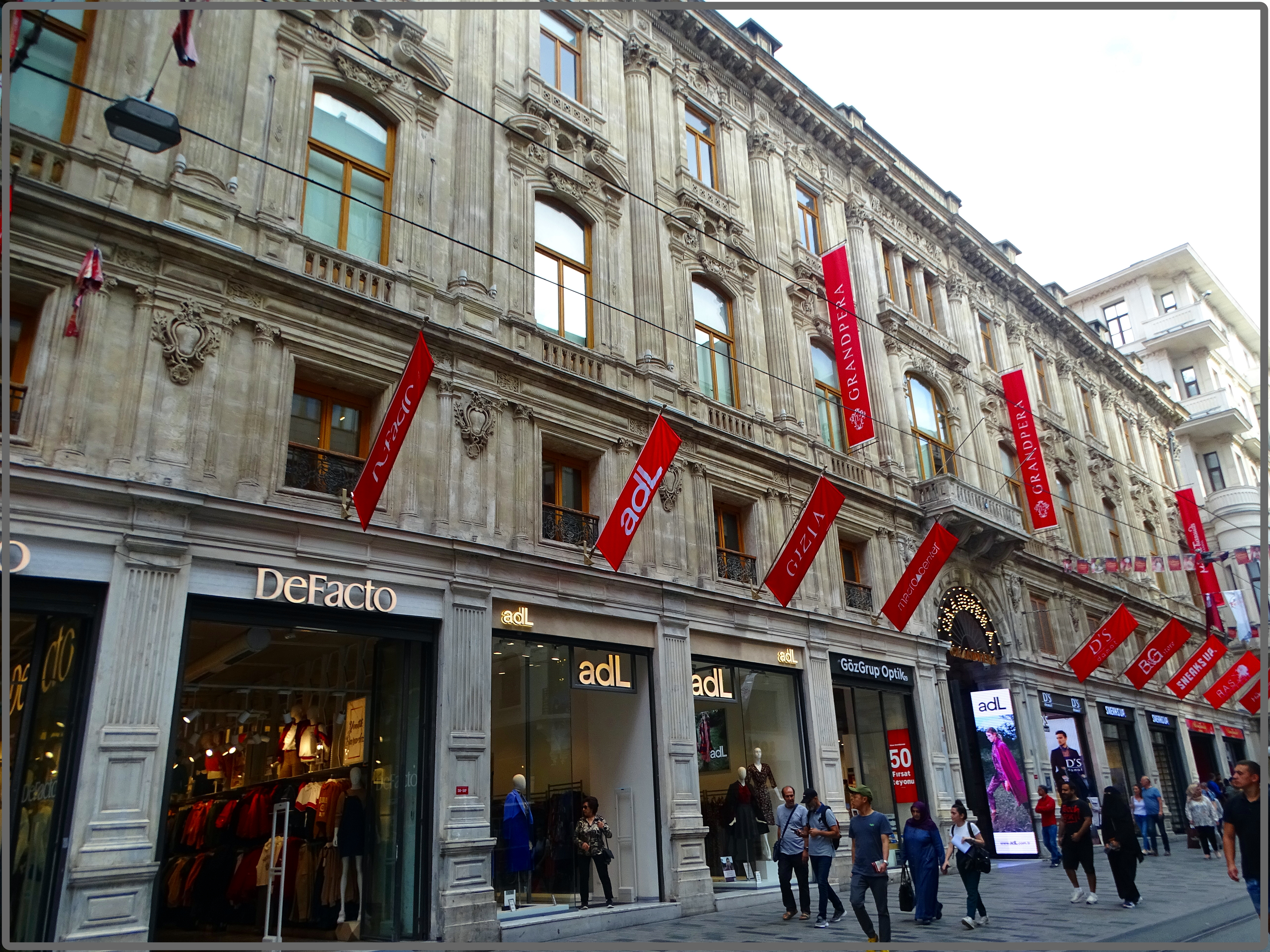
Exterior of DeFacto store at Grand Pera mall, İstiklal Avenue, Istanbul

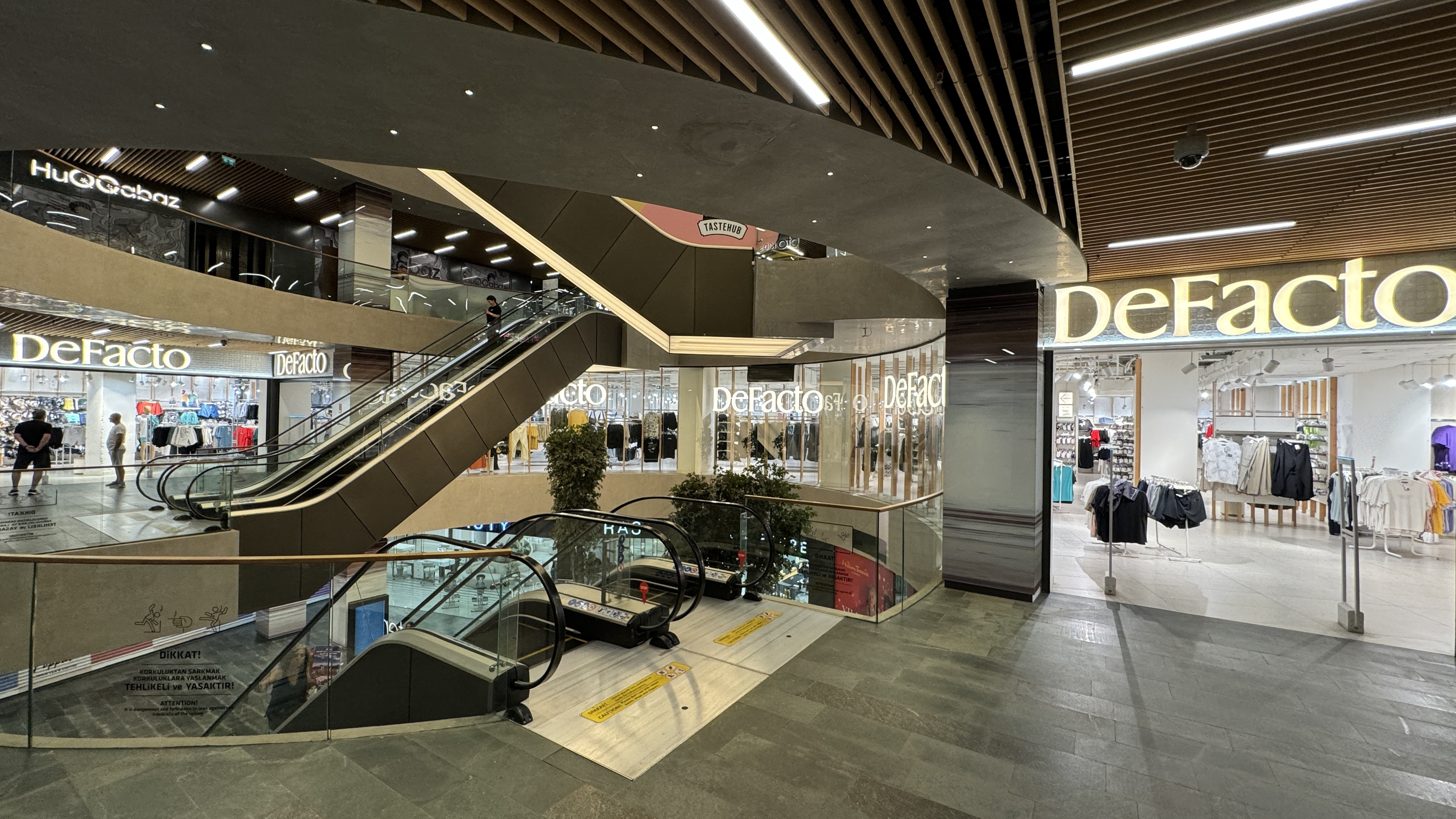
Multiple entrances of DeFacto Grand Pera

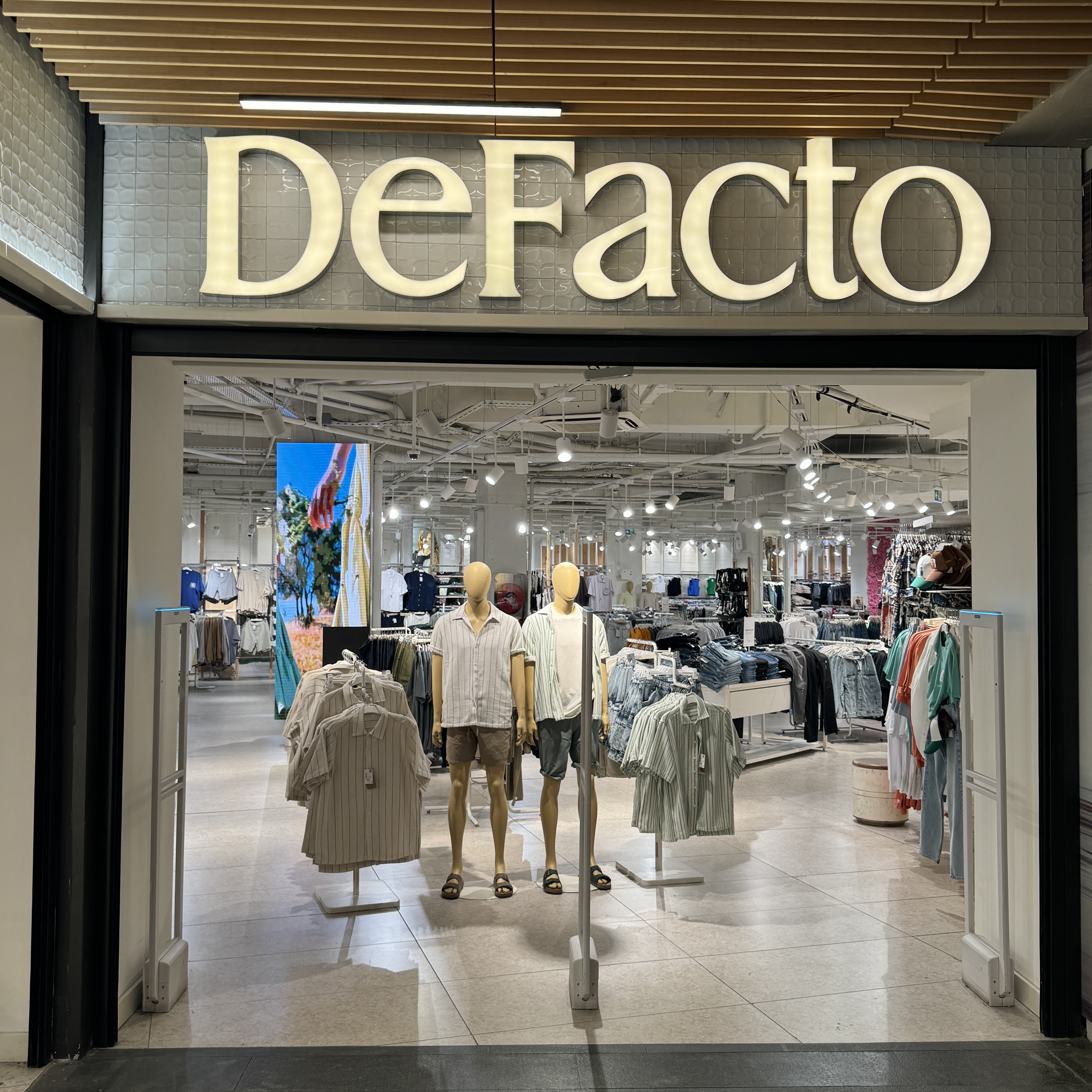
One of the entrances at DeFacto Grand Pera

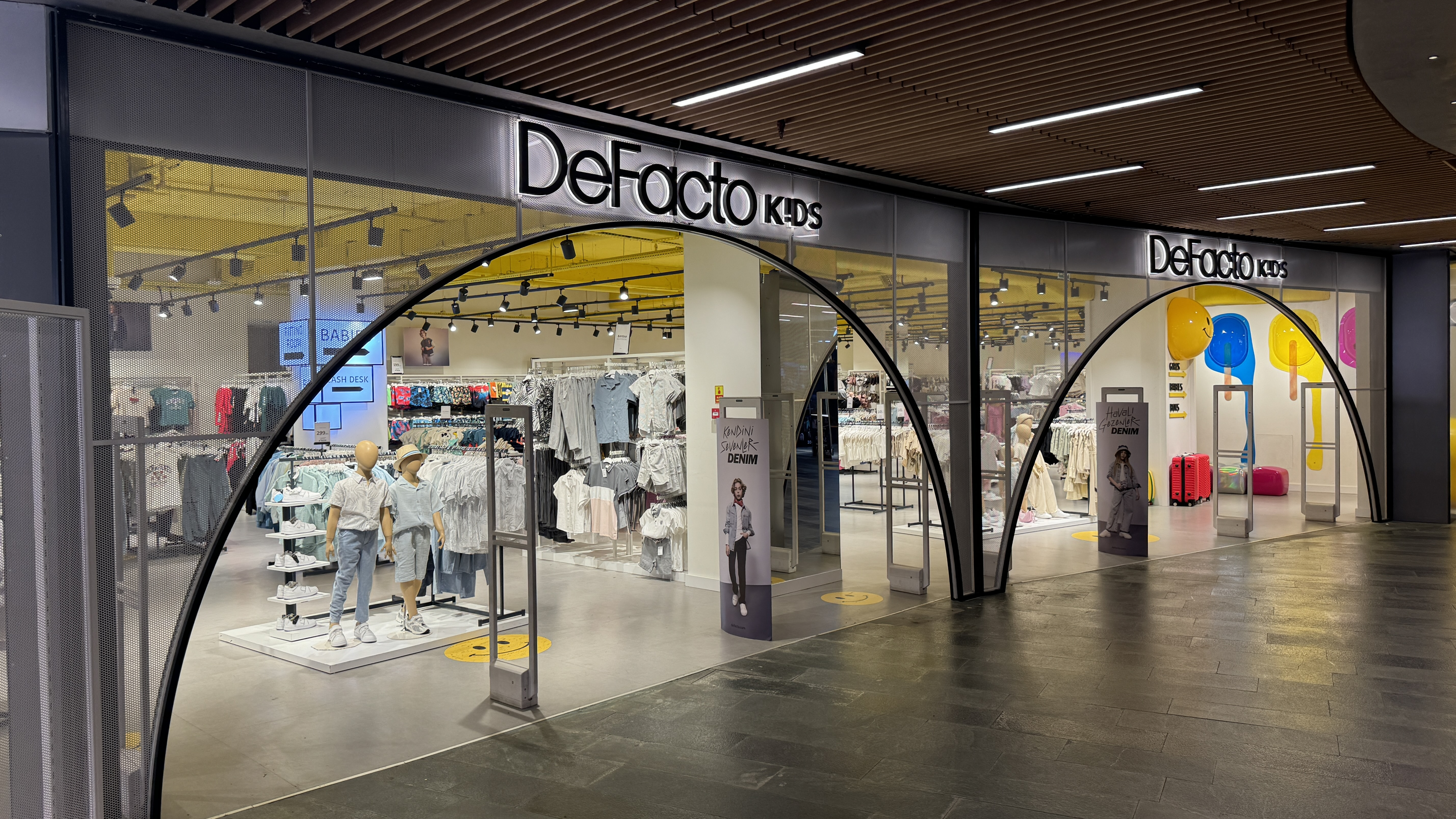
DeFacto Kids store at Grand Pera

Old logo of DeFacto

DeFacto was founded in 2003 by Zeki Cemal Özen, the owner of Ozan Tekstil. Their present CEO is İhsan Ateş, who started his career at LC Waikiki. The company introduced four distinct brands – Captain Hook, DeFacto, Chale, and Sweater – served to customers through 350 retail outlets in Merter. Ozon Clothing leveraged its expertise in production, while outsourcing marketing, retail, sales, and design. Other brands were phased out to concentrate solely on the DeFacto brand of men's, women's, and children's wear, for the first two years without its own retail stores.

In 2003, the company's market data showed that only 6% of customers were willing to spend more than 50 Turkish lira on shirts. DeFacto saw this as an opportunity and, using Ozon Giyim's production capabilities, the brand launched both its products and retail store formats. It defines its market niche as "Mediterranean comfort".

The company opened its first store outside of Turkey, in Kazakhstan, in 2013.

From 2010 to 2015, DeFacto had an average annual growth rate of 49%. In 2014, annual sales reached 1.18 billion Turkish lira (TRY) (about US$540 million) and 146 million TRY in operating profit (about US$71 million). Employee numbers reached 5,932. At the time, it had 20 stores in 4 countries outside Turkey: 12 in Kazakhstan, 5 in Iraq, 2 in Egypt and 1 in Belarus. It aimed to close 2015 with sales of 1.631 billion TRY (about US$600 million).

In 2015, DeFacto opened its first store in Morocco, in Marrakesh and the following year had opened 5 stores in that country. It also opened a design office in Barcelona.

As of September 2015, DeFacto had 277 stores in about 63 cities in Turkey and 50 abroad, with the company's Sustainability Report indicating presence in at least nine countries.

In 2016, DeFacto acquired 24 C&A-branded stores of the company C&A Moda Ticaret AŞ. As of that year, the stores with the highest sales were the ones in Baghdad, Federal Iraq.

In 2018, 30% of the company shares were offered to the public. The same year, DeFacto opened stores in Pakistan and Malaysia, bringing the total number of countries to 24 including Turkey, and 125 stores outside Turkey.

In 2023, the European Bank for Reconstruction and Development (EBRD) invested US$59 million into DeFacto. Franklin Templeton is another investor.

== Geographic presence ==
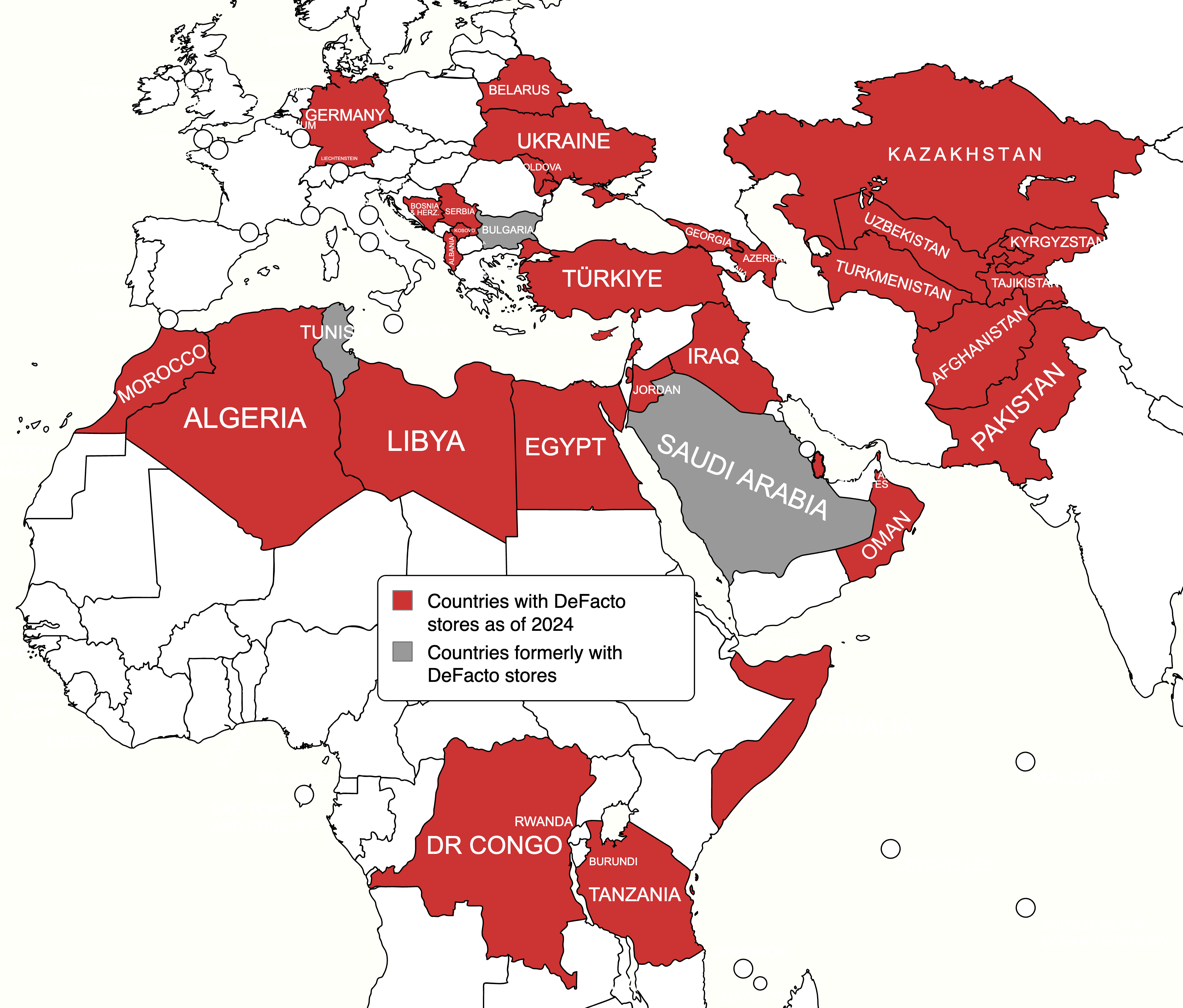
Countries with DeFacto stores as of 2024

Year	Stores in			Coun- tries with stores
Year	Tur- key	Other	Total	Coun- tries with stores
2013				2
2015	277	51	327	≥ 9
2016			419	17
2018		125		24
2024			±500	±31

As of 2024, DeFacto stores operate in Turkey and 33 other countries (launch year in each country in parentheses/brackets if known):

- Central Asia (5): Kazakhstan (2013), Kyrgyzstan, Tajikistan, Turkmenistan, Uzbekistan (2021)
- Middle East (6): Iraq (Federal and Kurdish autonomous region), Jordan, Lebanon, Oman, Palestine, Qatar, Bahrain
- North Africa (4): Algeria, Egypt, Libya, Morocco (2015)
- Europe (12): Albania, Azerbaijan, Belarus, Bosnia and Herzegovina, Cyprus (Turkish Republic of Northern Cyprus), Georgia, Germany, Kosovo, Moldova, Russia, Serbia, Ukraine (2021)
- South Asia (2): Afghanistan, Pakistan
- sub-Saharan Africa (4): DPR Congo, Mauritius, Somalia, Tanzania

As of the end of 2017, DeFacto had 324 stores in Turkey and 123 stores in 21 other countries, including Malaysia Saudi Arabia and Tunisia which as of 2024 are no longer operating. A store in Bulgaria at Serdika Center Sofia (Bulgarian: Сердика Център) has since also opened and closed.

As of 2024, DeFacto has around 500 stores and 13,000 employees.

== Brands ==
(Sub-)brands include:

- DeFacto Baby
- DeFacto Kids
- DeFacto Fit - activewear and fitness apparel
- DeFacto Coool - young, trendy, casual, affordable
- DeFacto Life - lifestyle-oriented, broader demographic: comfort, everyday wear
- DeFacto Modest - provides more coverage of the body, thus aligning with certain cultural or religious dress codes while still aiming to be stylish and modern
- DeFacto Plus - offers larger sizes
- DeFacto Studio - more refined and sophisticated, high-quality, elegant, contemporary, for both professional and social settings
