= Bulgaria Boulevard, Sofia =

Boulevard in Sofia, Bulgaria

Coordinates: 42°40′16″N 23°17′37″E

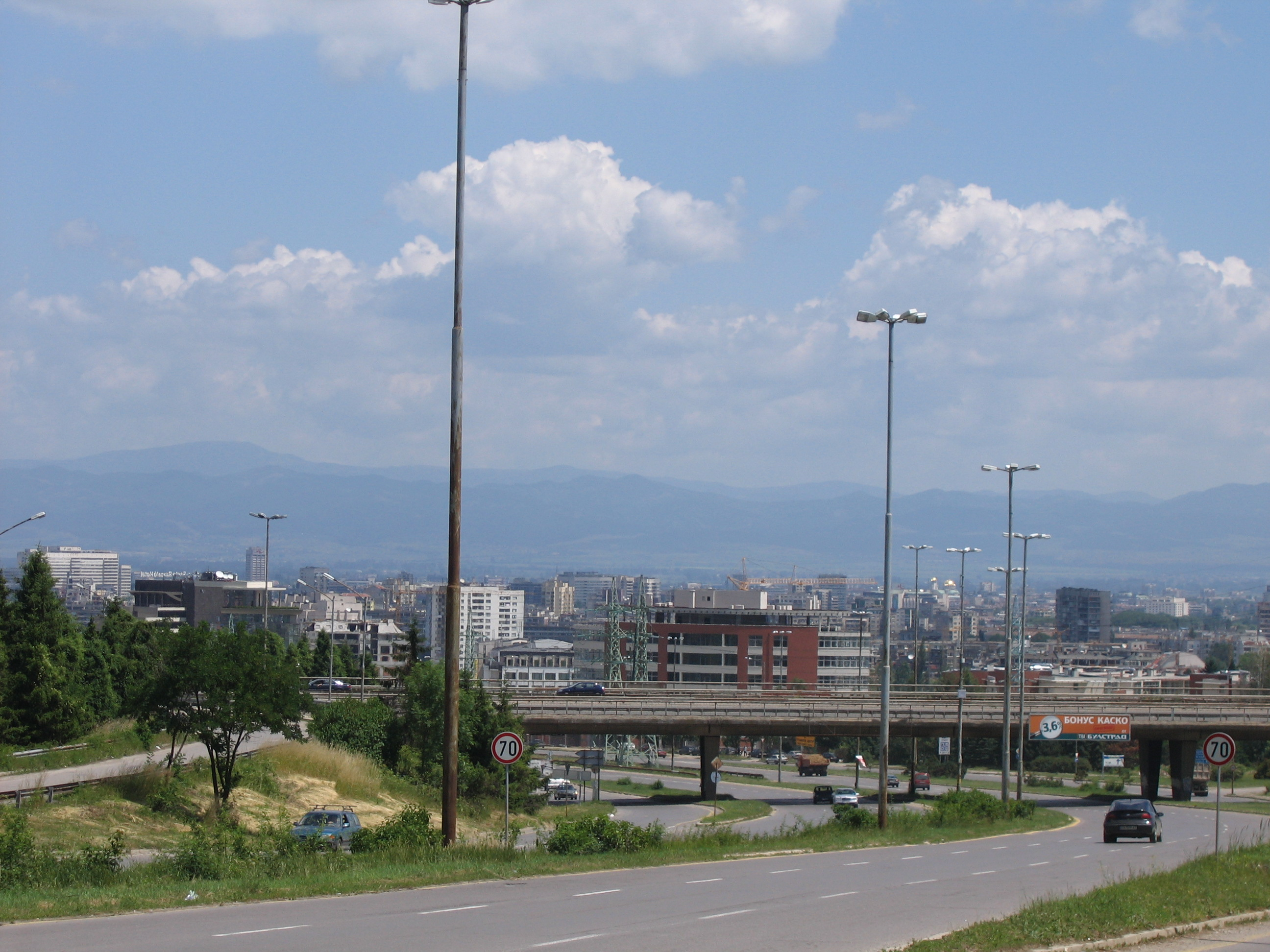
View along Bulgaria Boulevard looking from the southern neighbourhoods towards the centre of the city

Bulgaria Boulevard (Bulgarian: Булевард „България“) is a boulevard and key thoroughfare connecting Sofia's centre, Bulgaria, with the southern neighbourhoods of the city and Boyana.

The boulevard was planned and built at the same time as the construction of the National Palace of Culture, which is located close to the northern end of the boulevard, which continues as Evlogi Georgiev Boulevard towards Orlov most after the intersection with Cherni Vrah Boulevard. The southern end of Bulgaria Boulevard is the intersection with the Sofia ring road towards Boyana, after which it is called Daskal St. Popandreev.

Neighbourhoods located along or near Bulgaria Boulevard, listed in a north-to-south order, include Ivan Vazov, Hipodruma, Belite Brezi, Strelbishte, Krasno selo, Motopista, Borovo, Buxton, Gotse Delchev, Bokar, Manastirski Livadi, and Boyana.

== Gallery ==
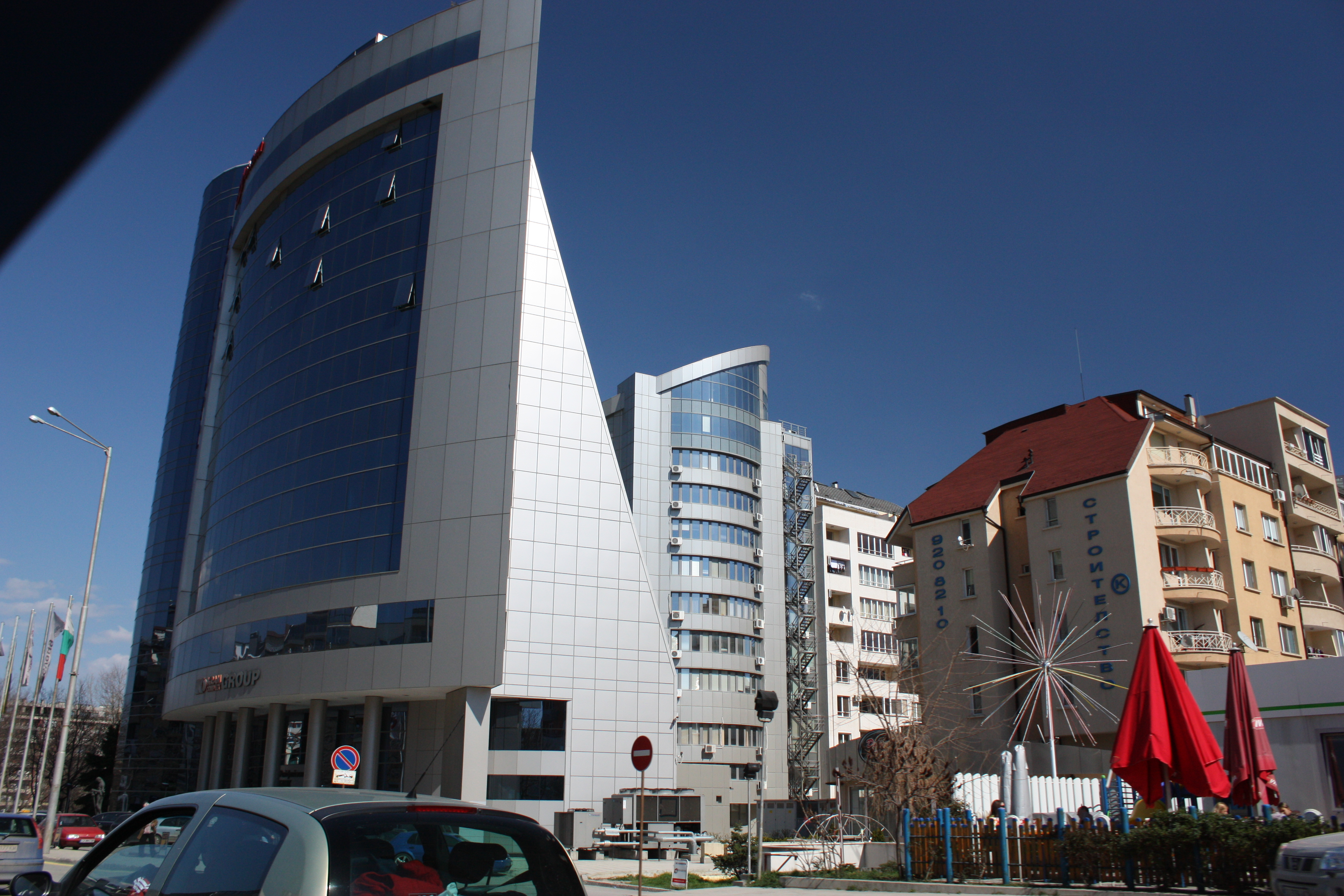

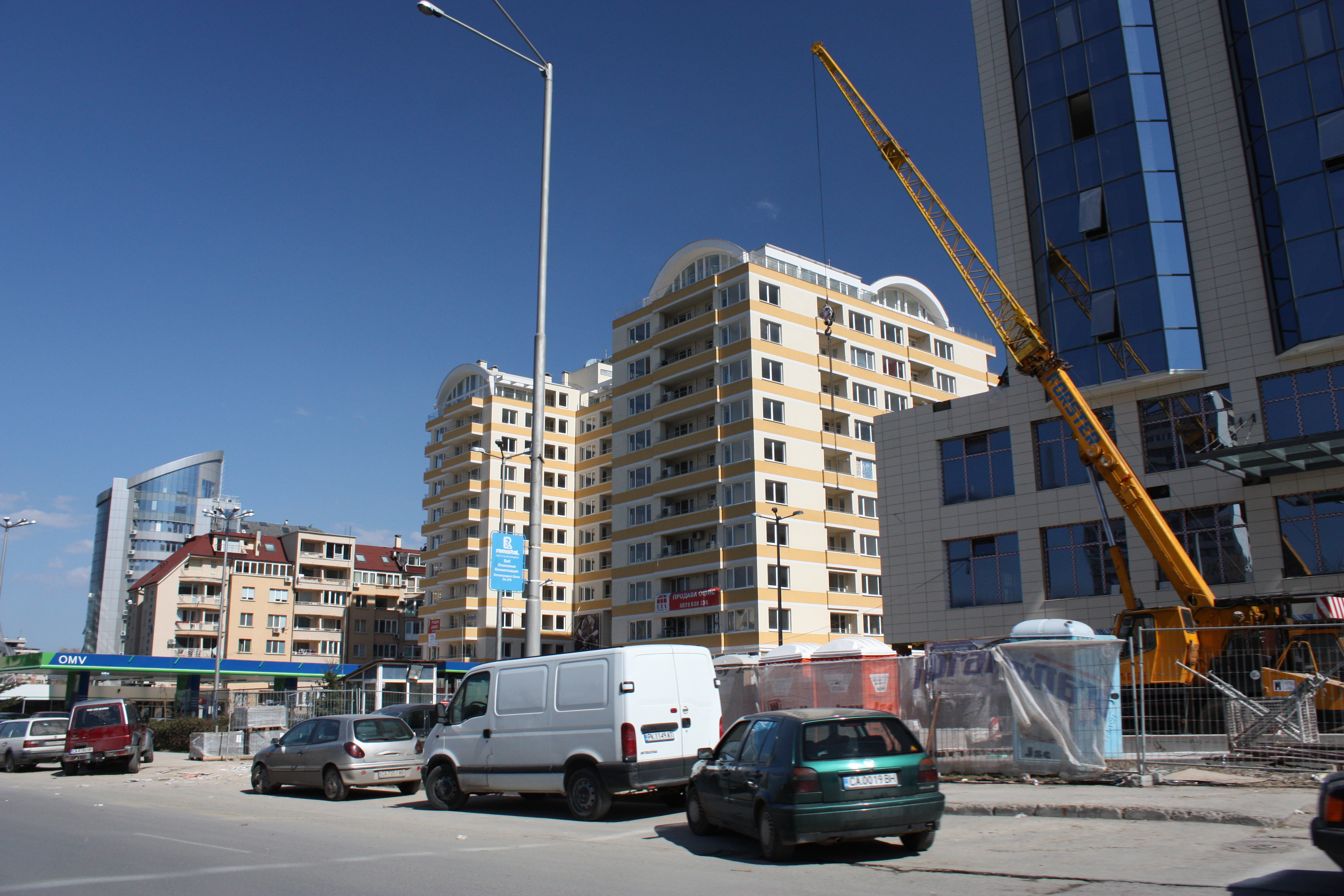

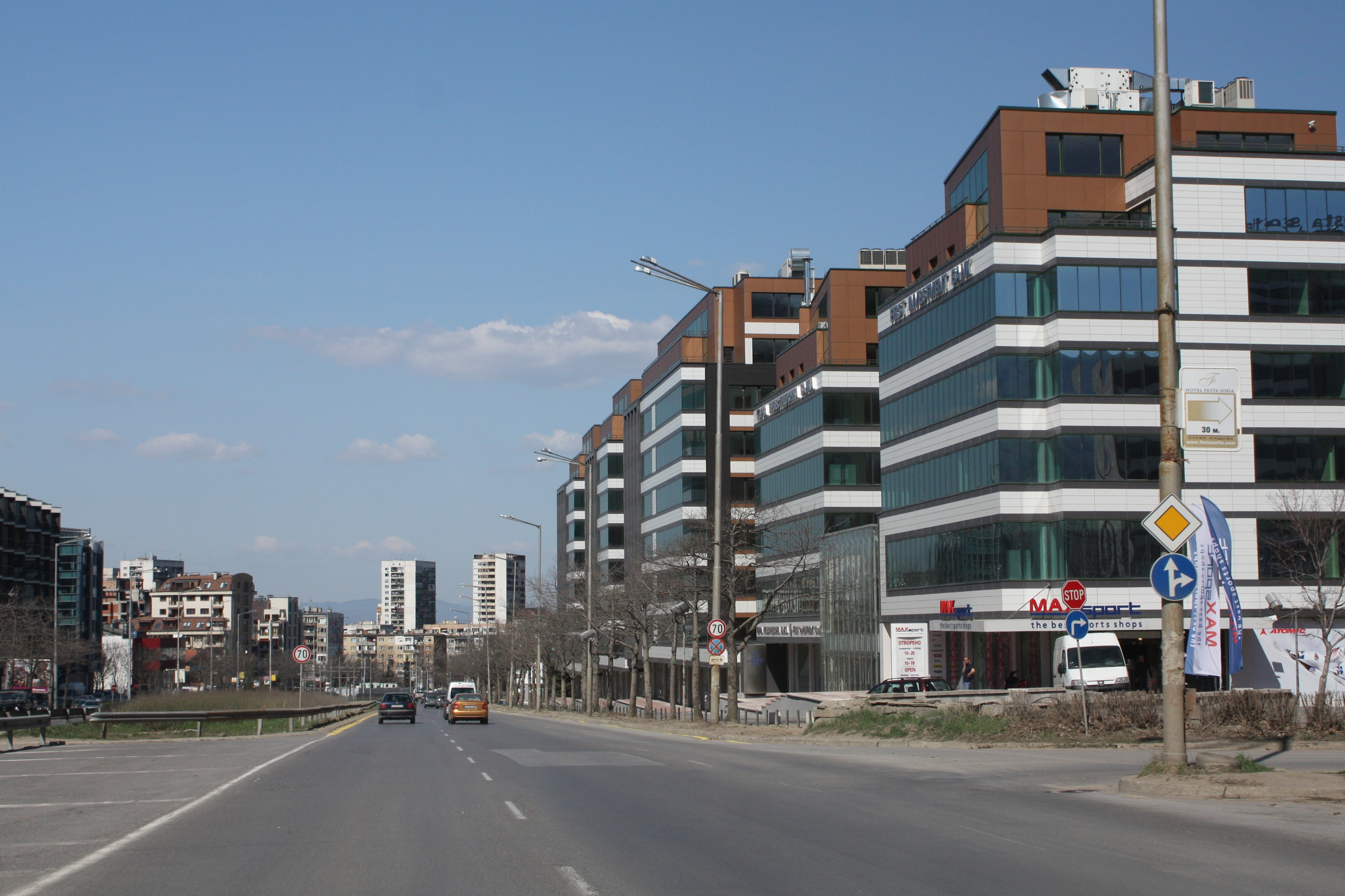

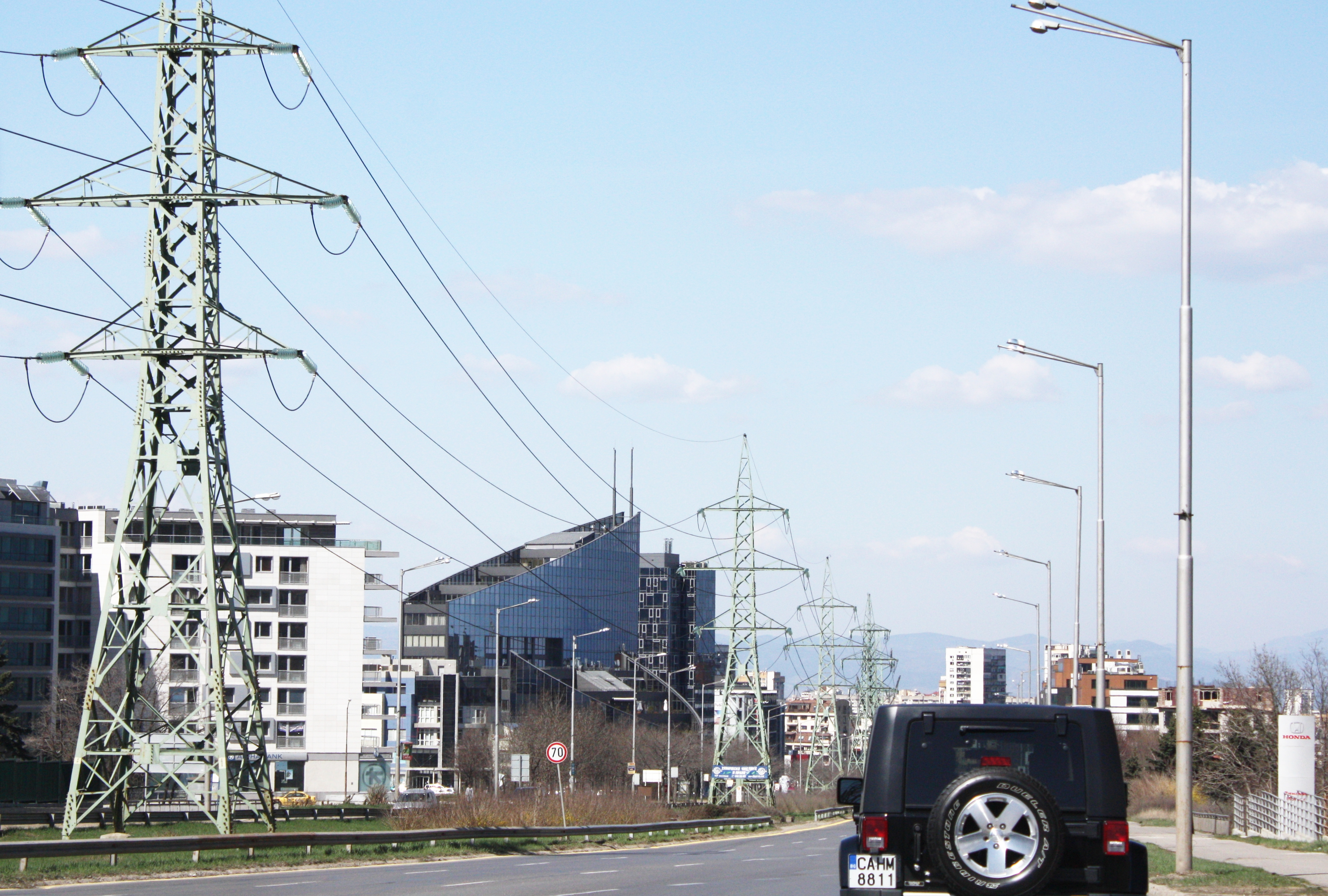

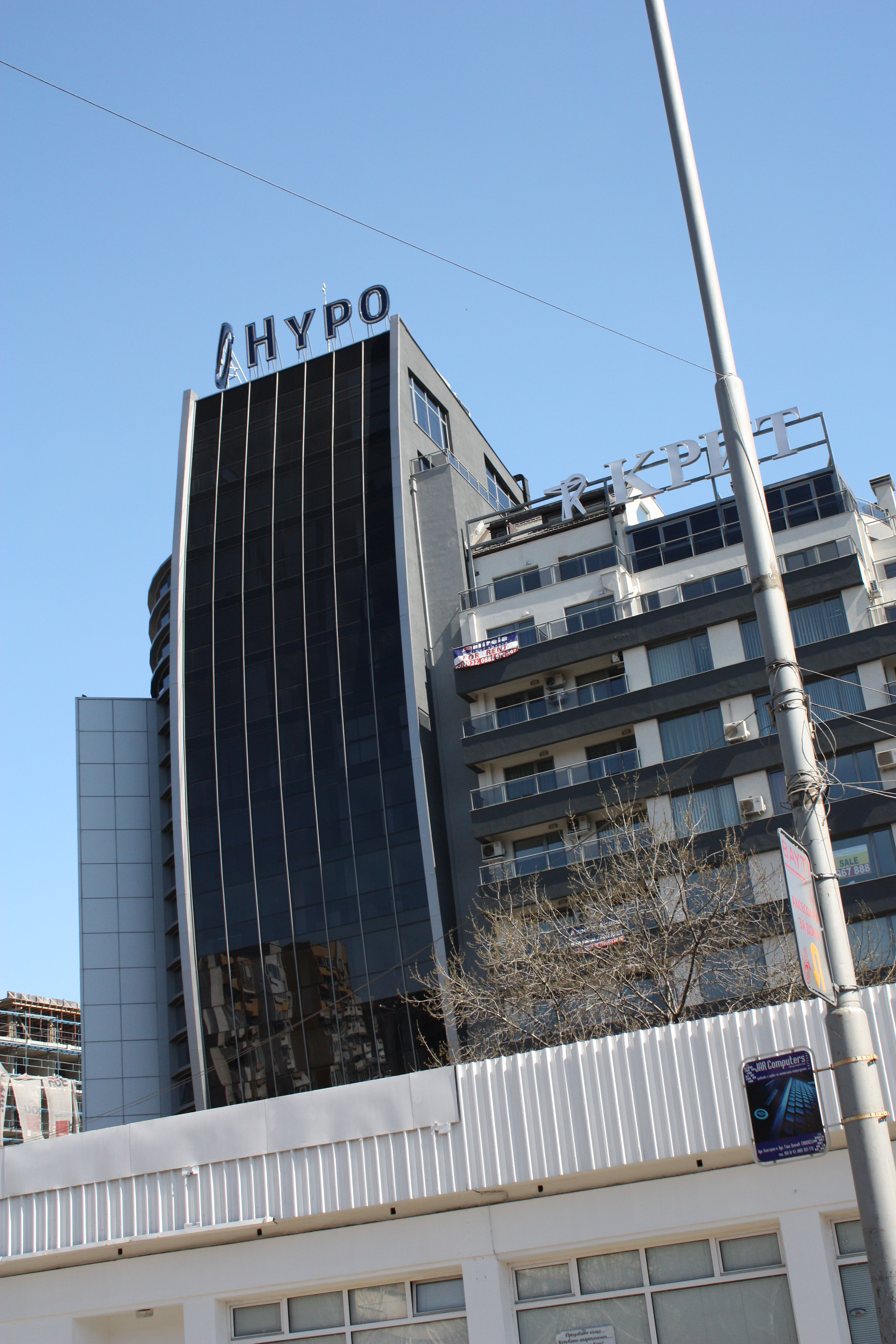

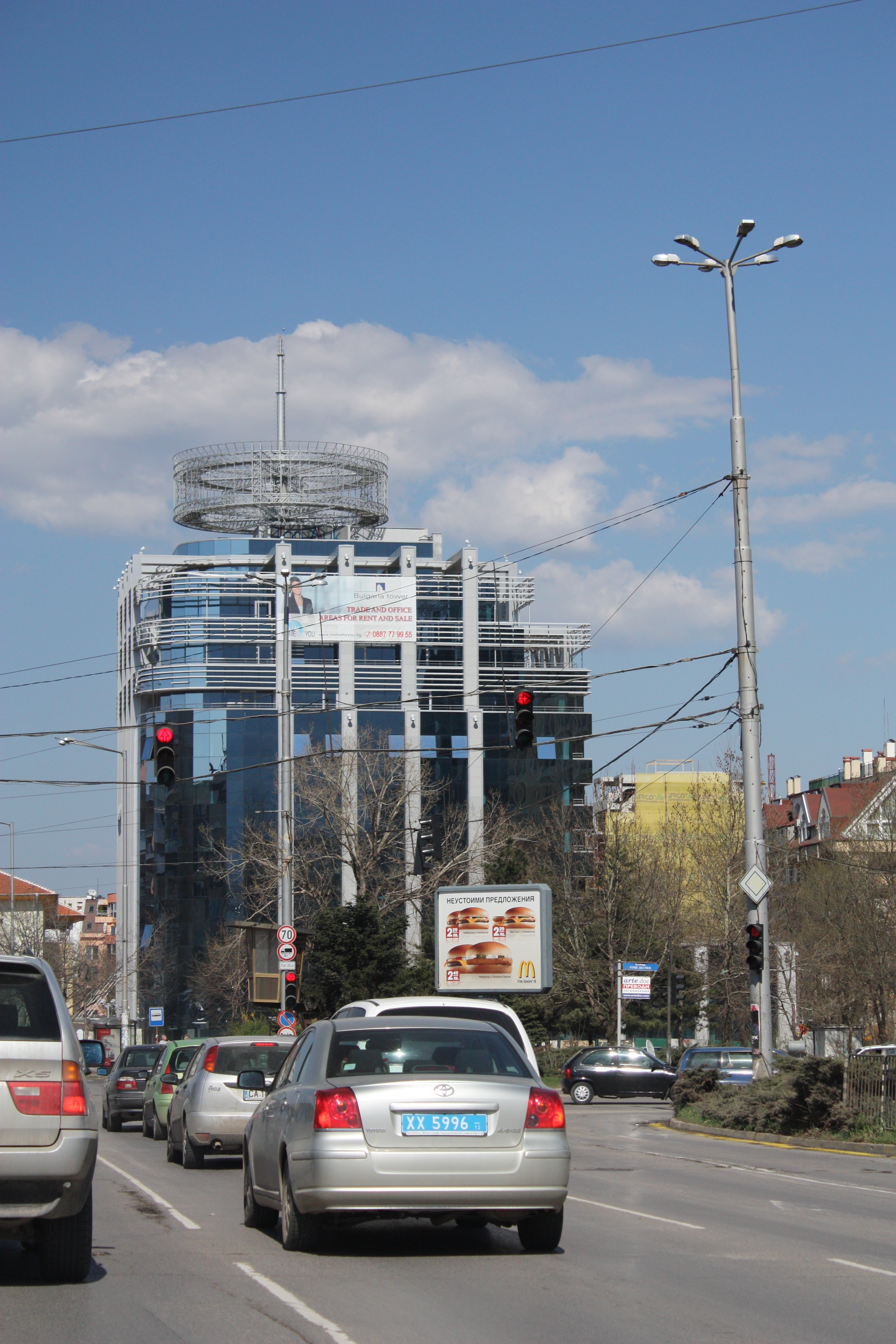

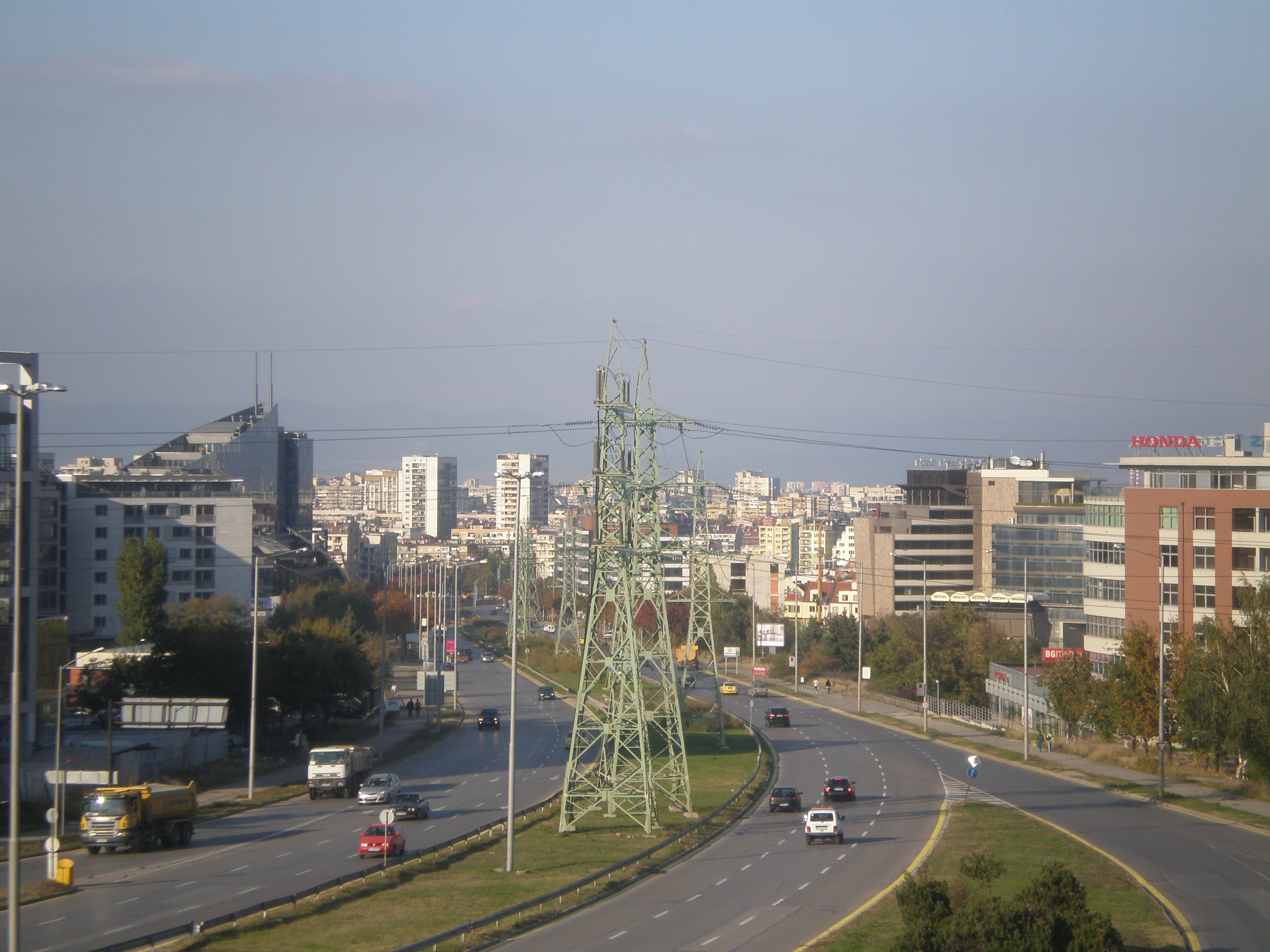

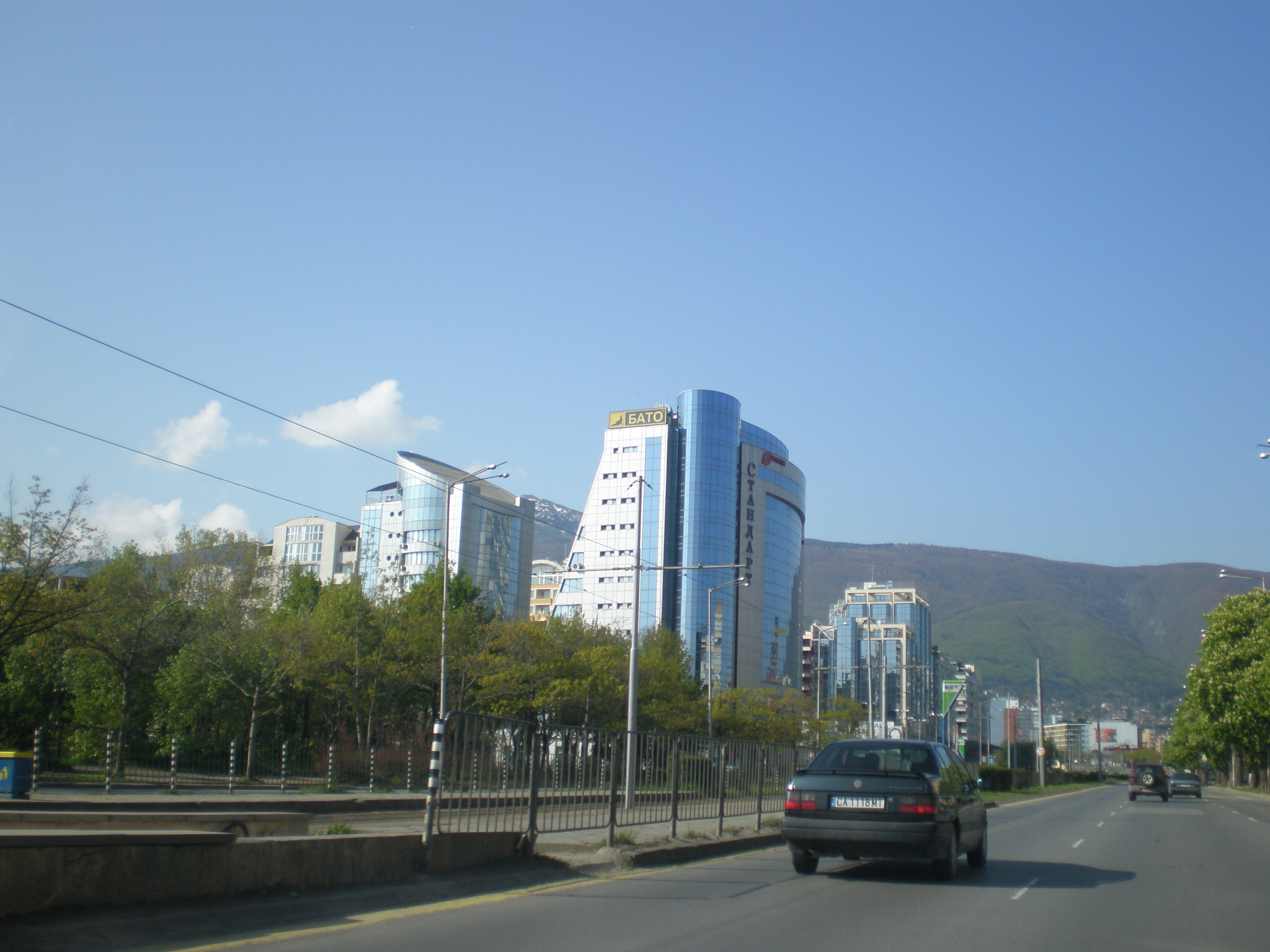

== See also ==
- Bulgaria Mall
