= Bulgaria Mall =

- Location: Sofia, Bulgaria
- Coordinates: 42.6641°N 23.2885°E
- Floor area: 33,000 m^{2} (360,000 sq ft)
- Website: bulgariamall.bg

Bulgaria Mall is a shopping mall in Sofia, Bulgaria. It opened on December 1, 2012. It's retailers include both international and Bulgarian brands.

The shopping center is positioned at the intersection of Bulgaria Boulevard and Todor Kableshkov boulevard, two major roads in Sofia. The mall was developed as a part of a mixed-use retail and office project, with approximately 130,000 m² of total built-up area (33,000 m² for the commercial area). The shopping center includes four underground levels (parking and a hypermarket of approx. 5,600 m²) and four above ground levels with retail and entertainment. The parking facility can accommodate approximately 1,100 parking spaces. The office portion of the development, which consists of an office high-rise tower and an office building, contains 25,000 m² of area to let. The mall claims to have one of the biggest skylights in Central and Eastern Europe. The owners of Bulgaria Mall are Myles Summerfield and Nikola Yanakiev. The value of the whole project is estimated 100 million euro.

== See also ==
- List of malls in Sofia
- Bulgaria Boulevard, Sofia
- Sofia ring road
