= Park Center Sofia =

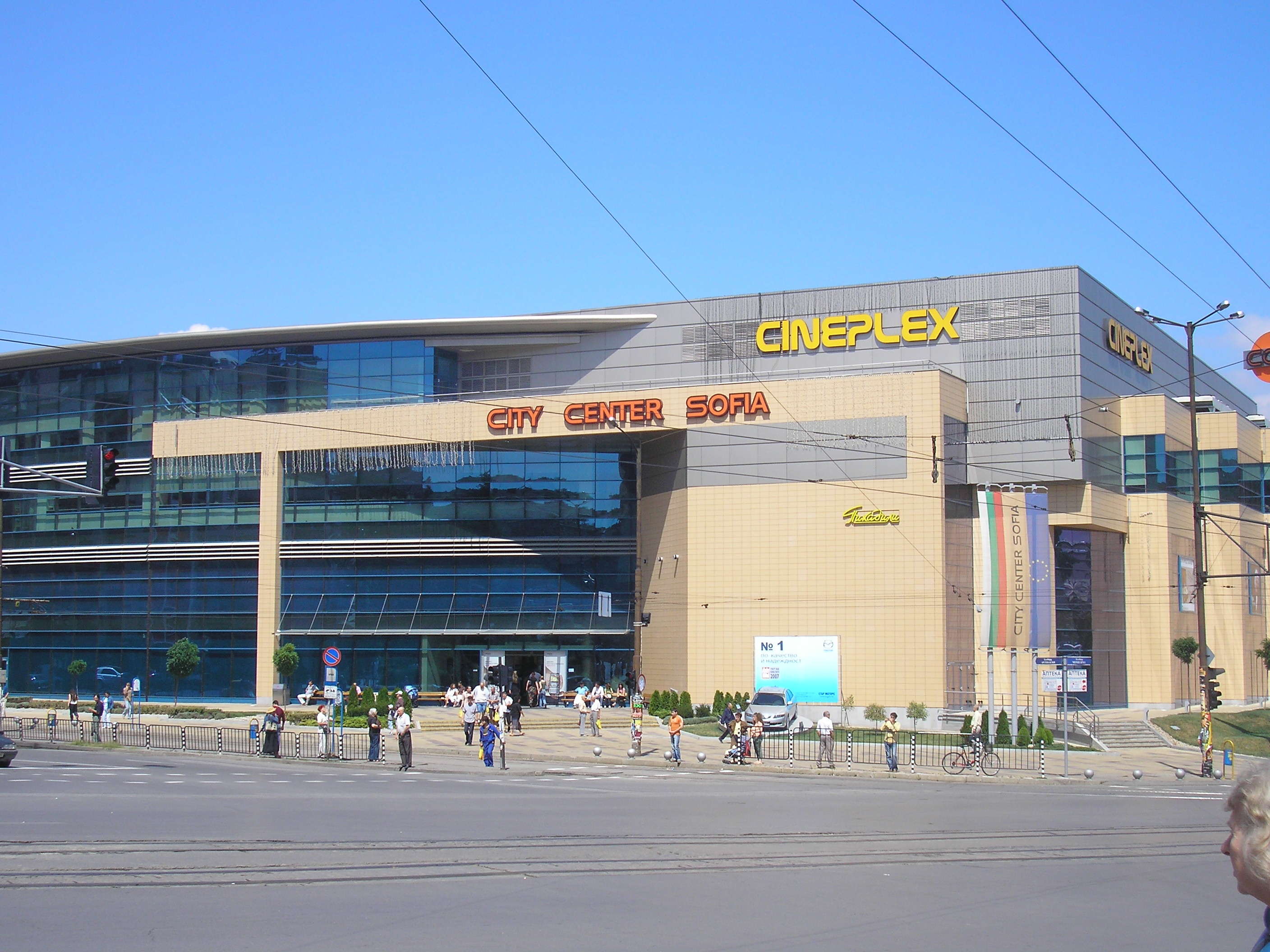
- Location: Sofia, Bulgaria
- Coordinates: 42°40′43″N 23°19′14″E
- Floor area: 23,000 m^{2} (250,000 sq ft)
- Website: parkcenter.bg

Park Center Sofia, formerly City Center Sofia, is a shopping mall located in Sofia, Bulgaria, opened in the spring of 2006. It is south of the National Palace of Culture in the municipality of Triaditsa at the intersection of the Boulevards "Cherni vrah" and "Arsenalski", next to European Union Metro Station and diagonally opposed to the Hemus Hotel.

The mall has six stories (including two underground) and a total built-up area of 44,000 m^{2} (470,000 sq ft) (23,000 m^{2} (250,000 sq ft) for the commercial area). There are more than 100 stores, several cafés, a pharmacy, beauty parlors, bank offices and parking lots. There are also two hypermarkets presented in the mall: Technomarket and Billa. The cinema complex Cine Grand has six halls with a total capacity of 1,340 seats.

== See also ==
- List of malls in Sofia
