= Serdika Center Sofia =

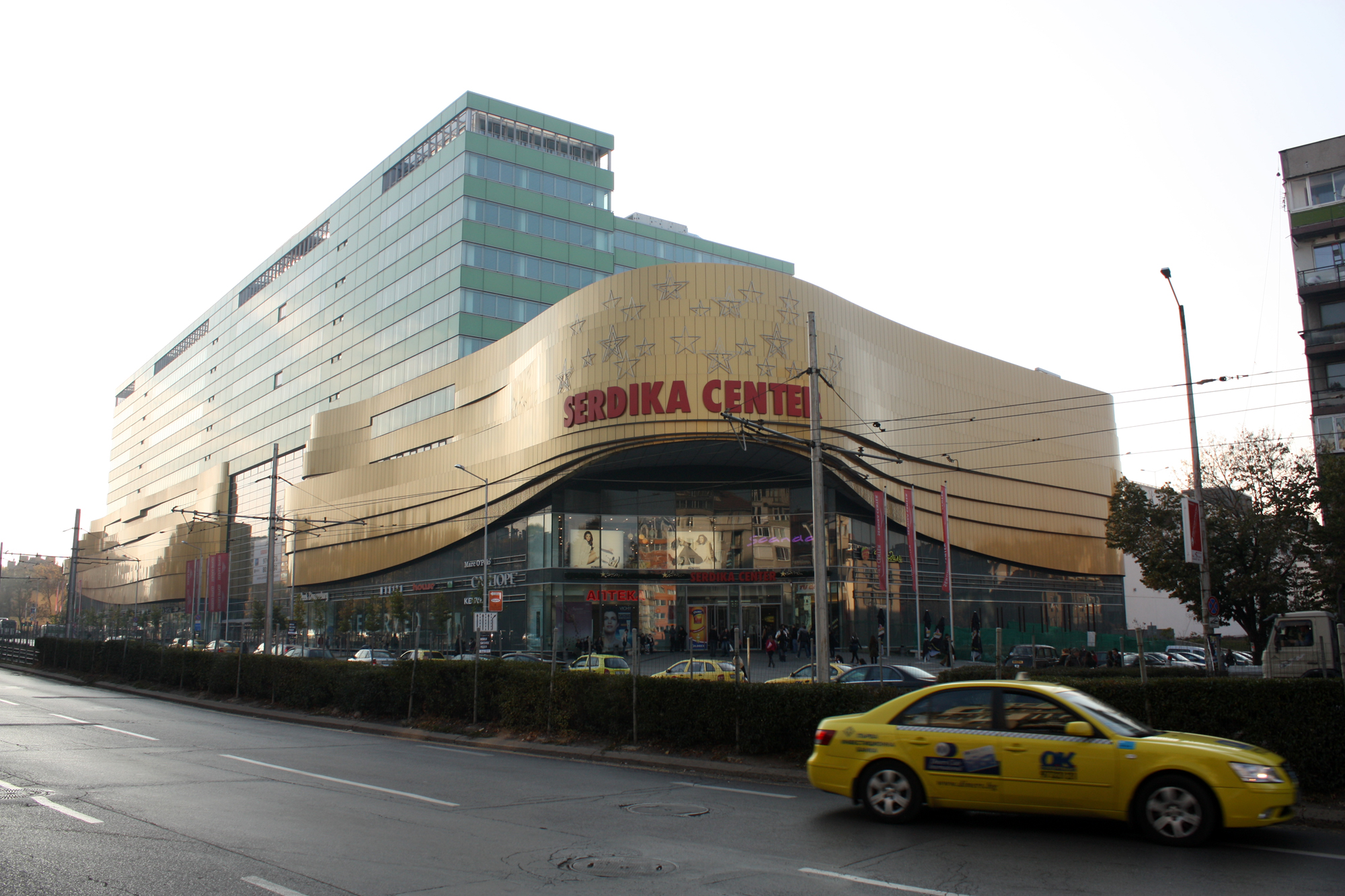
- Location: Sofia, Bulgaria
- Coordinates: 42.692°N 23.354°E
- Floor area: 51,000 m^{2} (550,000 sq ft)
- Website: serdikacenter.bg

Serdika Center Sofia is a shopping mall located in Sofia, Bulgaria, opened in the spring of 2010 and has more than 210 stores. Serdika Center Sofia is located on Sitnyakovo Boulevard in the municipality of Oborishte. The shopping mall is a 5-minute drive from Sofia's main motorway Trakiya, 10 minutes from Sofia Airport and 10 minutes from the central part of Sofia. Turkish apparel company DeFacto was once an anchor at the mall but has since closed. On Their Place zara renovated their shop and now has two floors. But is also having a cinema.

== See also ==
- List of malls in Sofia
