= The Mall (Sofia) =

Shopping mall in Sofia, Bulgaria

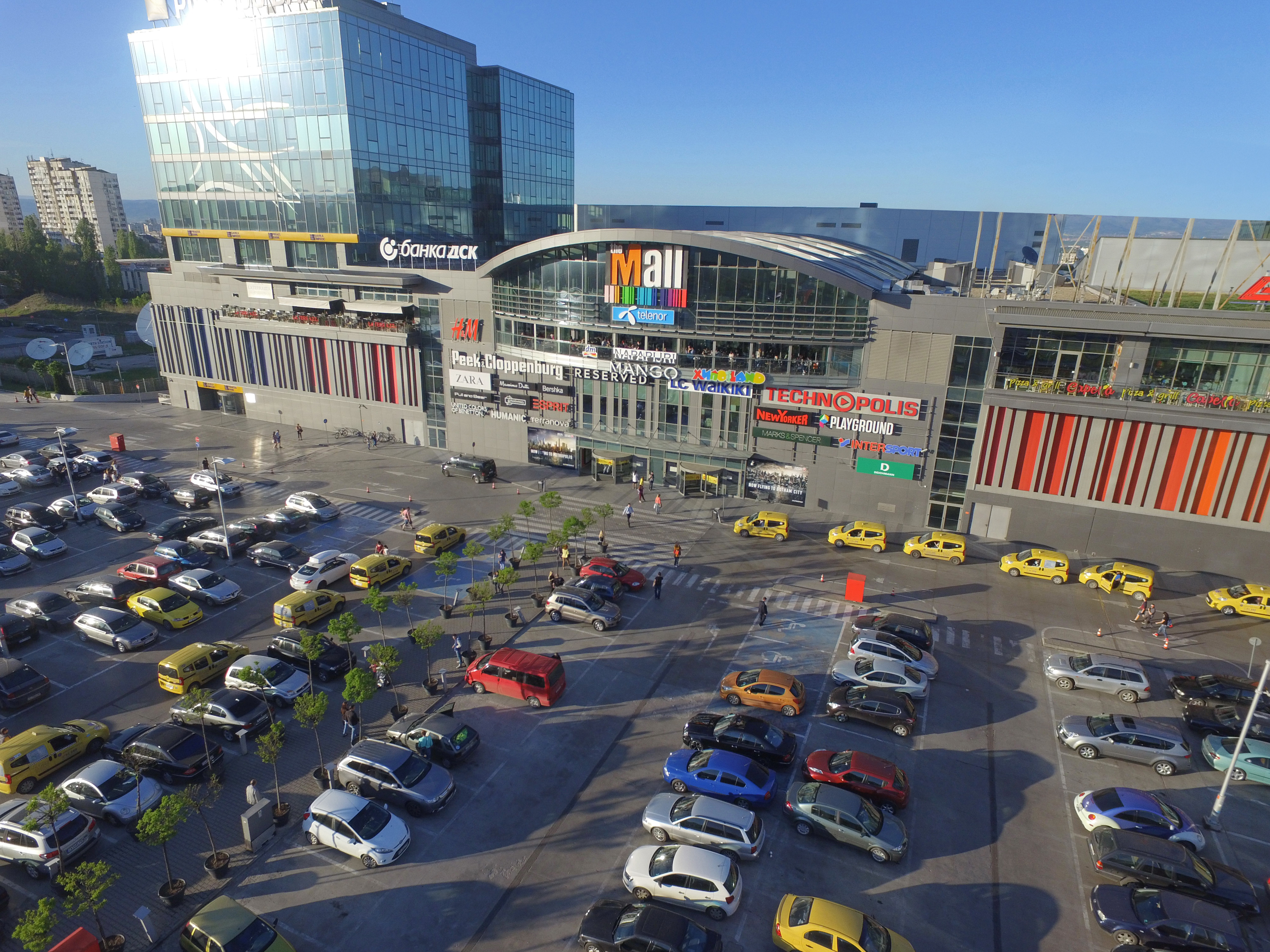
- Location: Sofia, Bulgaria
- Coordinates: 42.660517°N 23.382172°E
- Address: 115 Tsarigradsko shose Blvd.
- Opened: April 21, 2010
- Owner: Hystead Limited
- Floor area: 62,000 m^{2} (670,000 sq ft)
- Floors: 6
- Website: www.themall.bg

The Mall, also known as Tsarigradsko Mall, is a shopping mall in Sofia, Bulgaria. Until 2013, it was the largest shopping mall in the Balkans. Opened in spring 2010, The Mall claims it has a total area of 62,000 square meters (667,000 sq ft) on six stories, three of which are underground. It claims to contain more than 240 shops, restaurants, recreations centers, bars, cafeterias. The Mall has a parking capacity for more than 2,800 vehicles. Bulgaria's largest Carrefour hypermarket at 9,000 square meters (97,000 sq ft) was within the Mall till 2016. The Mall can be found at 115 Tsarigradsko Shose. Beside the mall lies a business center and the headquarters of Vivacom — the largest telecommunications company in Bulgaria. As of 2010, it has created 1,500 new jobs.

== See also ==
- List of shopping malls in Sofia
- List of shopping malls in Bulgaria
