= Sofia Ring Mall =

Shopping mall in Sofia, Bulgaria

- Location: Sofia, Bulgaria
- Coordinates: 42.6246°N 23.3519°E
- Opened: 6 November 2014
- Developer: Danaos Holdings, Fourlis Group
- Num. of stores: 200
- Floor area: 69,000 m^{2} (740,000 sq ft)
- Floors: 5
- Website: www.sofiaring.bg

Sofia Ring Mall is a shopping mall in Sofia, Bulgaria. It opened doors on 6 November 2014. Sofia Ring Mall is a shopping center of new generation, which has two hundred stores representing over 400 brands of which 100 completely new to the Bulgarian market. The shopping center has the largest indoor amusement center; the largest indoor karting track for the country with an area of 7,500 m^{2} (81,000 sq ft); the largest department store, extending to 6,500 m^{2} (70,000 sq ft); free parking lot with a total of 3,500 parking spaces and VIP parking lot with 100 places.

Sofia Ring Development will have a total cost of more than 300 million euro. The investment comes from the Greek companies Fourlis Group, which manages IKEA's franchising in Bulgaria, and Danaos Group, specialized in the shipping industry. It will be the largest mixed-use project in Bulgaria, spreading over an area of 400,000 m^{2} (4,300,000 sq ft), with 100,000 m^{2} (1,100,000 sq ft) belonging to the mall and its adjacent IKEA store, all near the southern arc of the Sofia ring road. In the near future it is expected that the Sofia Metro will have a nearby Metro station.

== See also ==
- List of malls in Sofia
