= List of shopping malls in Bulgaria =

This is a list of shopping malls in Bulgaria. Currently 32 malls are active in the country.

== Sofia ==
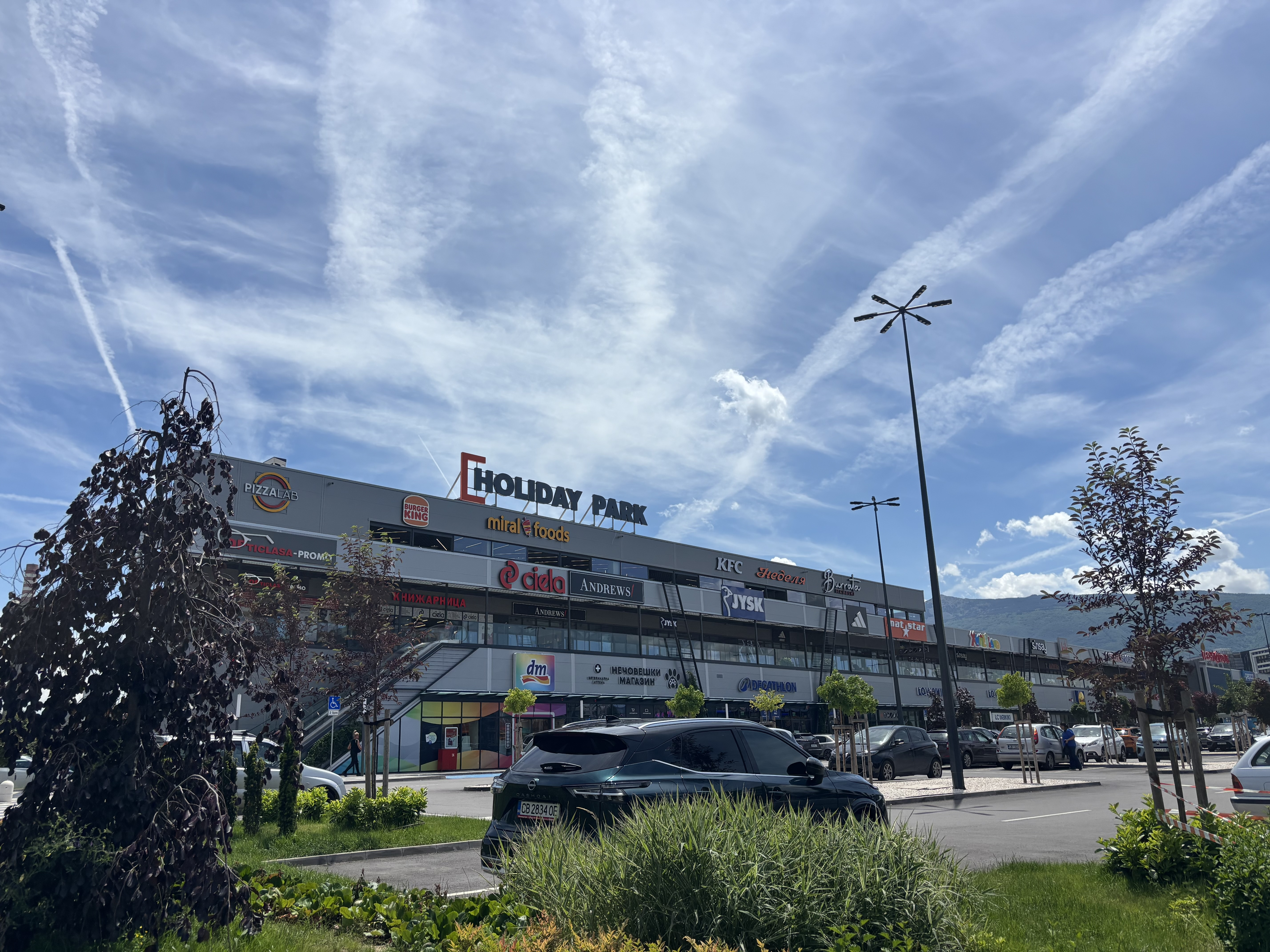
Holiday Park Sofia Crasno Celo

- Paradise Center (2013) (GLA 80,000 m^{2})
- Sofia Ring Mall (2014) (GLA 69,000 m^{2})
- The Mall (2010) (GLA 62,000 m^{2})
- XOPark Sofia (GLA 55,000 m^{2})
- Serdika Center Sofia (2010) (GLA 51,000 m^{2})
- Mall of Sofia (2006) (GLA 35,000 m^{2})
- Bulgaria Mall (2012) (GLA 33,000 m^{2})
- Holiday Park Sofia - Krasno Selo (2025) (32.300 m^{2})
- West Mall Sofia (2014) (GLA 24,000 m^{2})
- Park Center Sofia (former City Center Sofia) (2006) (GLA 22,000 m^{2})
- Sofia Outlet Center (2010) (GLA 15,300 m^{2})
- Sky City Mall (2006) (GLA 15,000 m^{2})
- Princess Outlet Center (2007) (GLA 12,000 m^{2})
- Shopping Center Iliyantsi and Mall Iliyantsi (2005) (GLA with open-air market area claimed to be more than 160,000 m^{2})

Under construction

- Plaza West Sofia (under construction) (2015) (GLA 37,750 m^{2})

Projected

- Canyon Trade Center (project) (2016) (GLA 32,000 m^{2})

== Plovdiv ==
- Mall Plovdiv Plaza (former Galeria Plovdiv) (2010) (GLA 46,000 m^{2})
- Mall Plovdiv (2009) (GLA 22,000 m^{2})
- Markovo Tepe Mall (2016) (GLA 21,000 m^{2})
- Grand Plovdiv (GLA 27,000 m^{2})
- Forum Trakiya (GLA 13,000 m^{2})

Under Construction

- Mall Promenada Plovdiv (under construction) (2025) (GLA 62,000 m^{2})

Cancelled

- Unnamed Mall (2006) (project)

== Varna ==
- Grand Mall (2010) (GLA 52,000 m^{2})
- Mall Varna (2008) (GLA 33,000 m^{2})
- Delta Planet Mall (2019) (GLA 40,000 m^{2})
- Varna Towers (2010) (GLA 29,000 m^{2})
- Pfohe Mall (2007) (GLA 13,000 m^{2})

== Burgas ==
- Burgas Plaza Mall (2009) (GLA 33,000 m^{2})
- Galleria Burgas (2012) (GLA 37,000 m^{2})

Proposed

- Sun City Centre (project)

== Rousse ==
- Mall Rousse (2010) (GLA 36,000 m^{2})
- Mega Mall Ruse (2010) (GLA 17,800 m^{2})

Proposed

- Danube Mall (T/O) (GLA 31,000 m^{2})
- Galleria Ruse (project) (GLA 43,000 m^{2})
- Grand Plaza (proposed) (GLA 37,500 m^{2})

== Stara Zagora ==
- City Center Stara Zagora (CCSZ) (2011) (GLA 16,000 m^{2})
- Galleria Stara Zagora (2010) (GLA 26,000 m^{2})
- Park Mall Stara Zagora (2008) (GLA 22,000 m^{2})
- Department Store Stara Zagora (1977) (GLA 18,500 m^{2})

Proposed

- Mall Stara Zagora - RESB (on hold

Closed

Carrefour City Mall (2013) (GLA 20,900 m^{2})

== Vidin ==
Mall Vidin (2008) (GLA 6,000 m^{2)}

== Pleven ==
- Central Mall Pleven (2007) (GLA 10,000 m^{2})
- Mall Panorama (2014) (GLA 22,000 m^{2})
- Mania Tower (City Center Pleven)
- Maxi Trade Center (2008) (GLA 6,000 m^{2})

== Shumen ==
Cancelled

- Shumen Plaza Shopping Center (project) (2006-2013) (GLA 20,000 m^{2})

== Haskovo ==
Proposed

- Mall of Haskovo (proposed)

== Blagoevgrad ==
Project

- City Mall (project) (21,000 m^{2})
- Focus Mall (project) (GLA 50,000 m^{2})

== Veliko Tarnovo ==
- Mall Veliko Tarnovo (2006) (GLA 33,000 m^{2})

== Gabrovo ==
- Mall Gabrovo (2010) (GLA 16,000 m^{2})
- Terra Mall (2009) (GLA 10,000 m^{2})

== Sliven ==
- S Mall Sliven (2015)
- City Center Sliven (2013)

== Silistra ==
- S&S Mall (2009)

== Samokov ==
- Mall Samokov

== Sandanski ==
- Sandanski Mall

== Sunny Beach ==
- Royal Beach Mall (2007)

== Yambol ==
- Mall Yambol (partially open - under construction)
