= Central Department Store (Sofia) =

- Централен универсален магазин

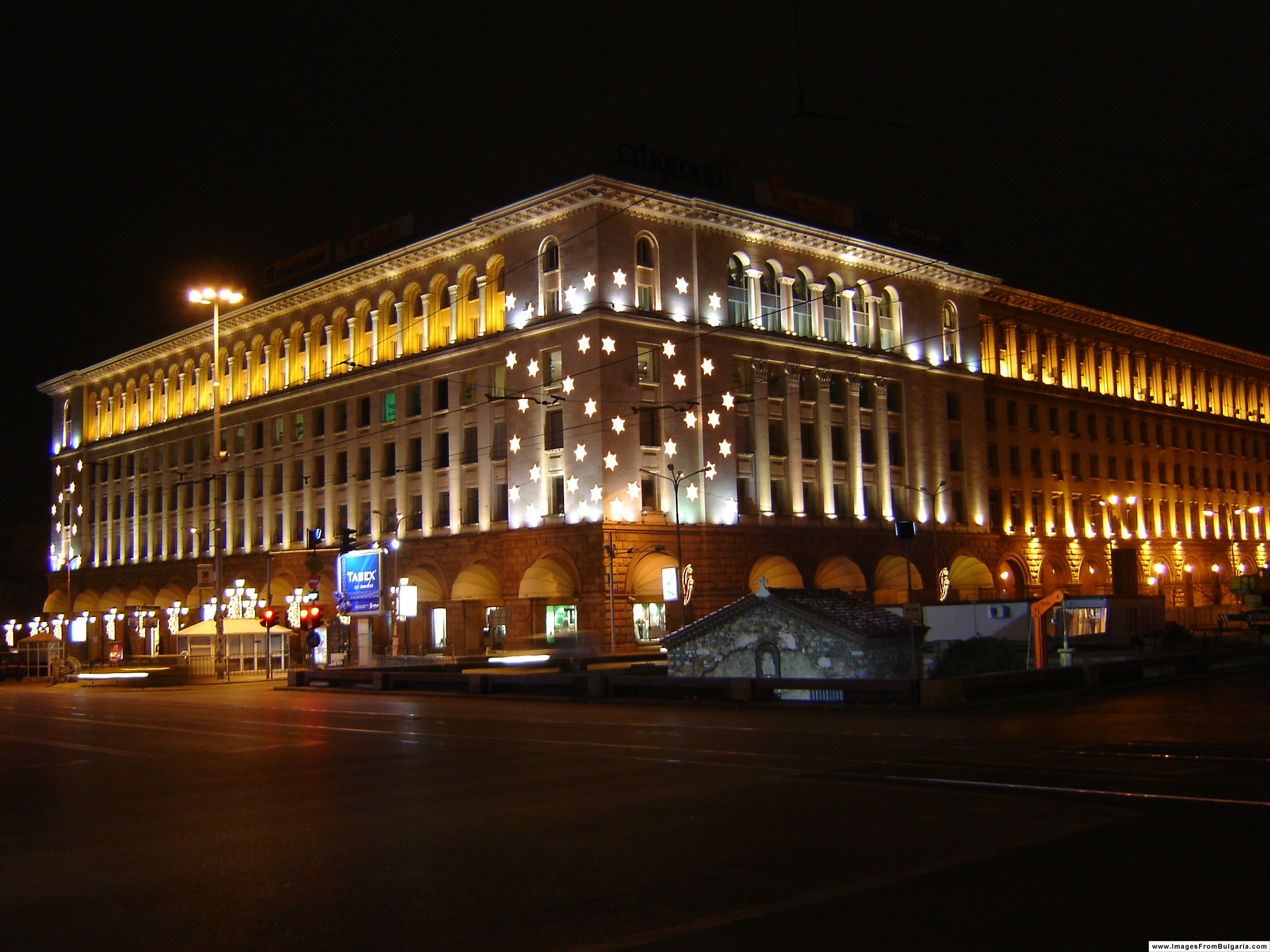
- The TSUM edifice
- Location: Sofia, Bulgaria
- Coordinates: 42°41′54″N 23°19′22″E
- Opened: 1957
- Floor area: 20,570 m^{2}
- Website: www.tzum.bg

The Central Department Store (Bulgarian: Централен универсален магазин, Tsentralen universalen magazin, abbreviated as TSUM) is an upmarket department store in the centre of Sofia, the capital of Bulgaria, officially opened in 1957 and situated in a monumental edifice (part of The Largo complex) on one of the city's main boulevards.

== History ==
The store's construction began in 1955 and ended in the end of 1956, when the first customers entered TZUM. It was officially opened with a ceremony in 1957. The edifice was designed by architect Kosta Nikolov and has an area of 20,570 m². It features a covered inner yard taking up the centre of five of the building's seven floors.

TSUM underwent major reconstruction in 1986 under the direction of architect Atanas Nikolov. Two years later, 120,000 people daily went through the store, which sold 123,000 items a day. After the democratic changes in 1989, the store remained public property until sold to Hong Kong fund manager, Regent Pacific Group, for the price of DM 30 million (about €15 million). Regent then invested $10.2 million in 1999–2000 to redevelop the property into a mixed-use office and retail building. TSUM was transformed to become a place for expensive boutiques rather than a store for the people, with the daily number of customers falling to 7,000. Plovdiv businessman Georgi Gergov acquired TSUM on 19 October 2004.

== Tenants ==
As of 2005, world brands like Laura Ashley, Timberland, Nautica, Fila, Fred Perry, Adidas, Mexx, Tommy Hilfiger, Swarovski, Miss Sixty, Nike, Bagatt, Altınbaş and Rossignol had stores in TSUM. The rent levels are one of the highest in Bulgaria, only competing with the neighbouring Vitosha Boulevard. According to the manager Tsvetomir Gergov, 12,000 people visited the store per day.

As of early 2023, besides a few stores in the main lobby and restaurants on the ground floor, the building has been emptied of all tenants with the official website marketing it as office spaces.

== See also ==
- List of malls in Sofia
- State Universal Store in Moscow
