= Mall of Sofia =

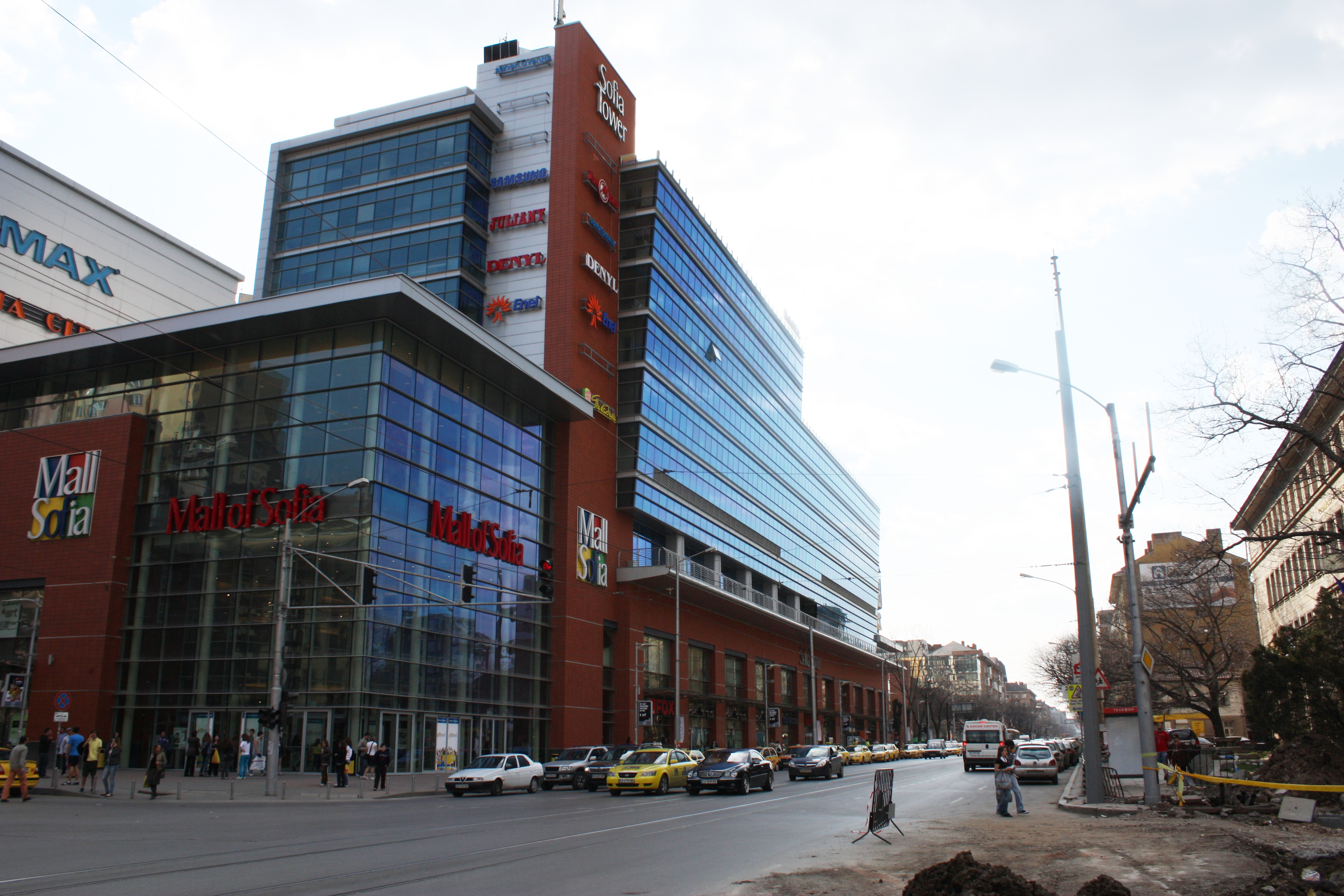
- Location: Sofia, Bulgaria
- Coordinates: 42°41′53″N 23°18′31″E
- Opened: 9 June 2006
- Floor area: 35,000 m^{2} (380,000 sq ft)
- Website: www.mallofsofia.com

Mall of Sofia is a shopping centre in the centre of Sofia, the capital of Bulgaria. It was opened on 9 June 2006 and is located at the intersection of Aleksandar Stamboliyski Boulevard and Opalchenska Street. The construction costs were estimated about 37 million euros. The complex also contains Sofia Tower, an office building located just above the mall.

It has 130 stores, a supermarket, pharmacies, a beauty salon, an Internet café and DVD and video rentals, among others. Mall of Sofia also offers a number of restaurants and cafés (such as McDonald's, KFC, Subway), as well as Cinema City, a 12-screen multiplex cinema also featuring the first 3-D IMAX theatre in Southeastern Europe, M-Tel IMAX.

The mall is four storeys tall and has a total of 70,000 m^{2} of built-up area, of which 35,000 m^{2} belong to the commercial and entertainment sector and 10,000 m^{2} are offices, while the underground parking lot takes up 22,000 m^{2} and has a capacity of 700 vehicles. The remainder of 8,000 m^{2} is occupied by service and common areas.

The complex was constructed after a project by MooreSpeakman International. Among the investors in the project are GE Commercial Finance Real Estate, Cinema City International, Aviv Construction and Public Works and Quinlan Private. Colliers International acted as the exclusive leasing agent of the project.

== See also ==
- List of malls in Sofia
