= Sofia =

Capital and largest city of Bulgaria

Sofia София
- Capital city
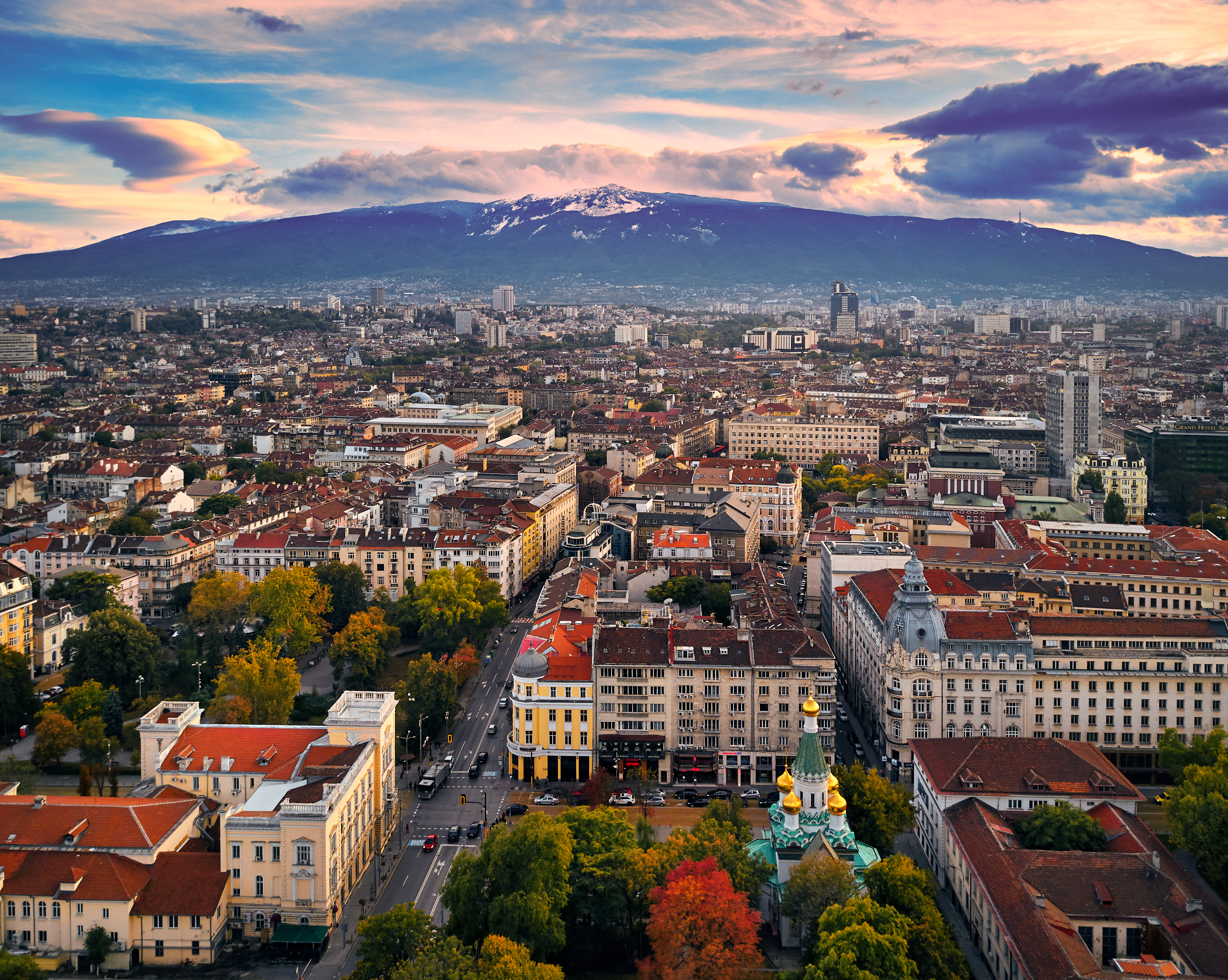
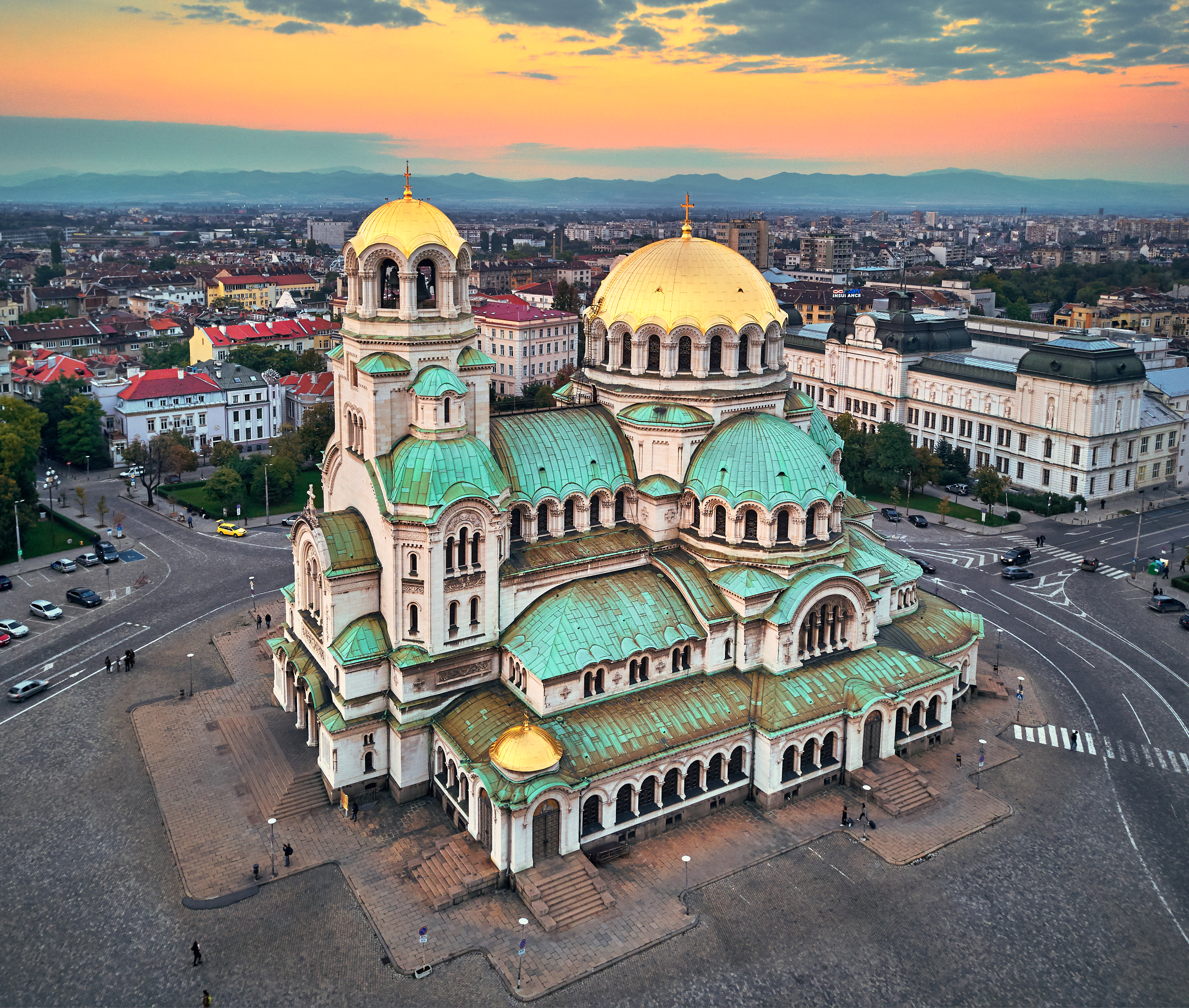
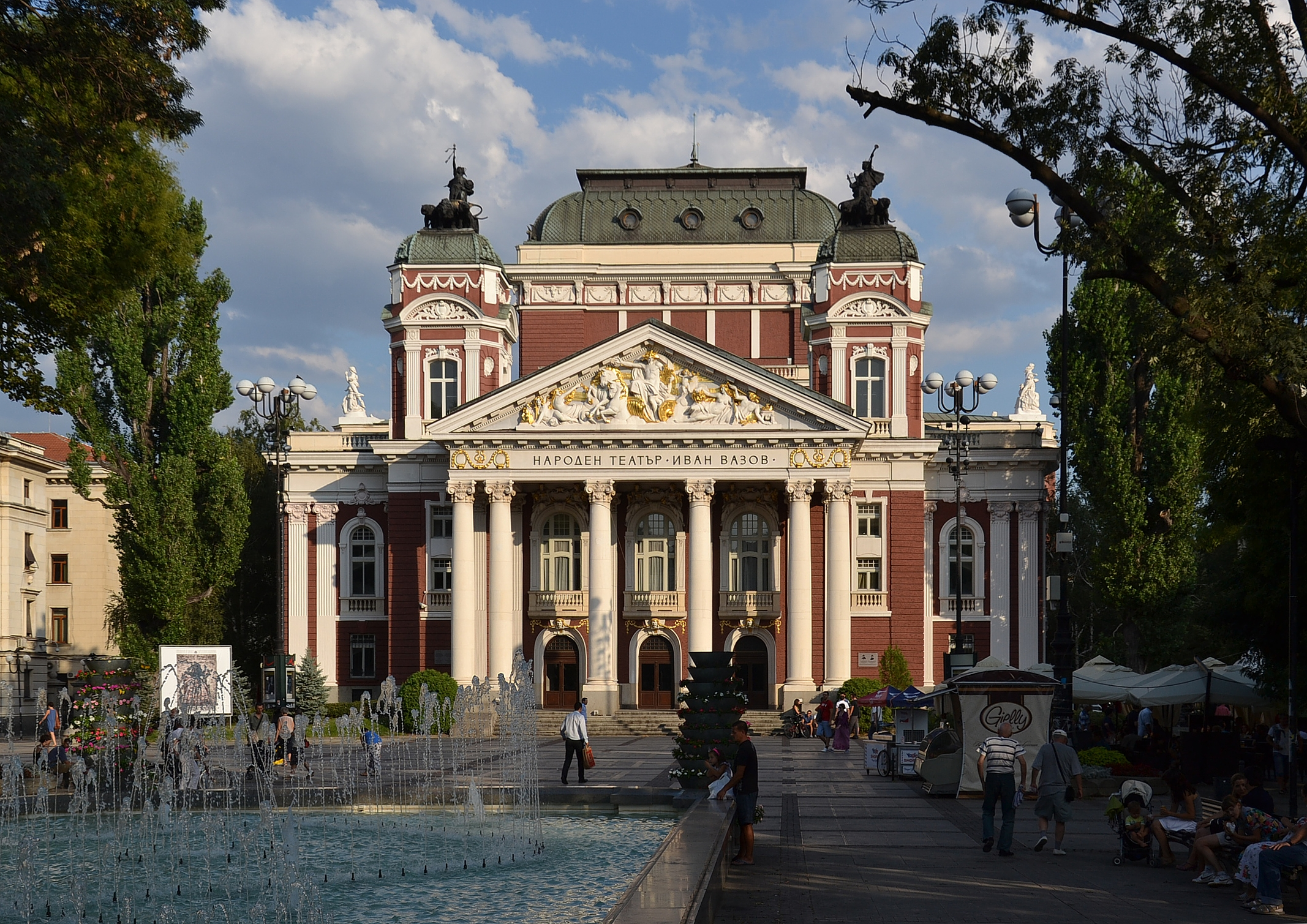
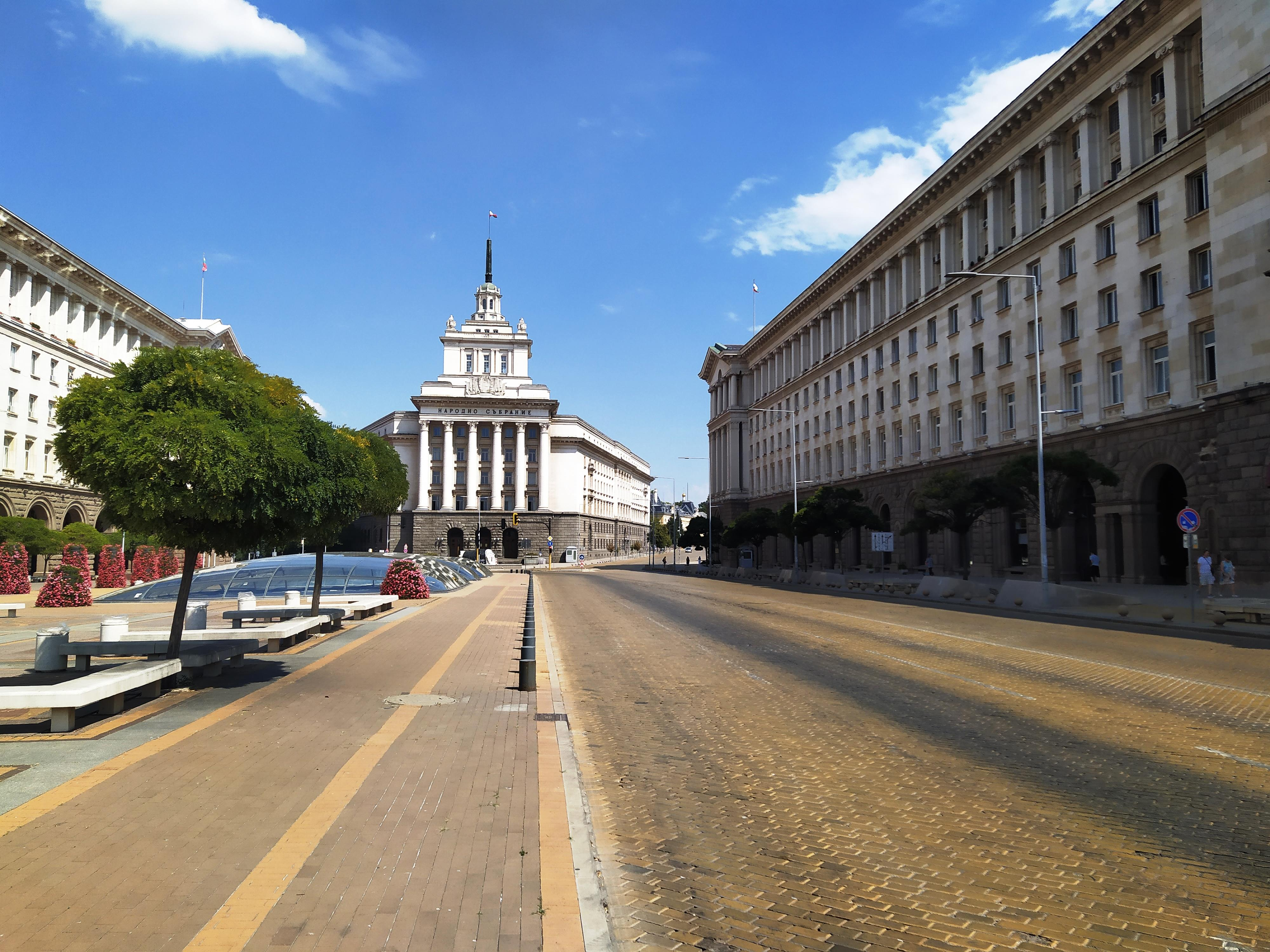
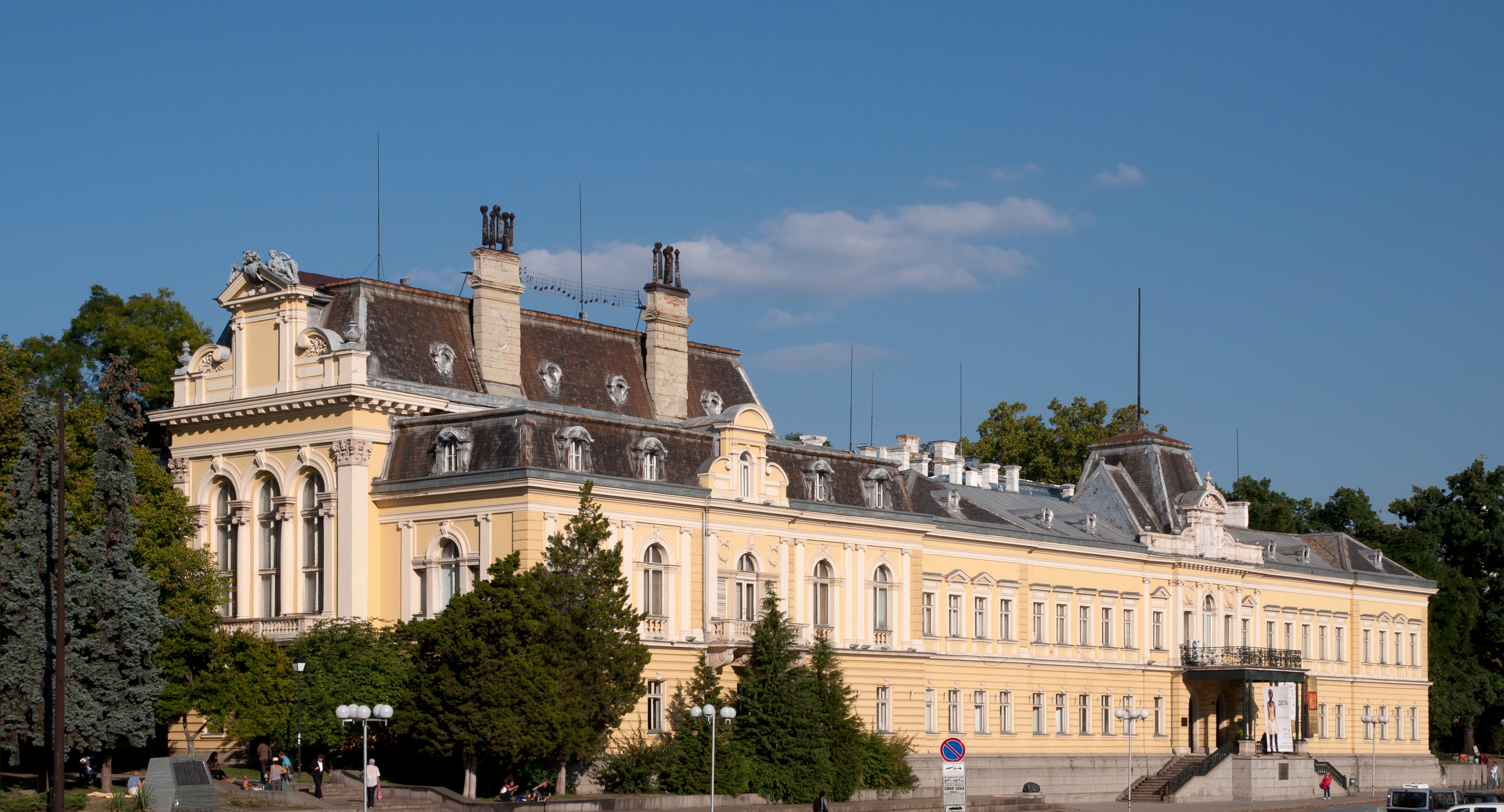
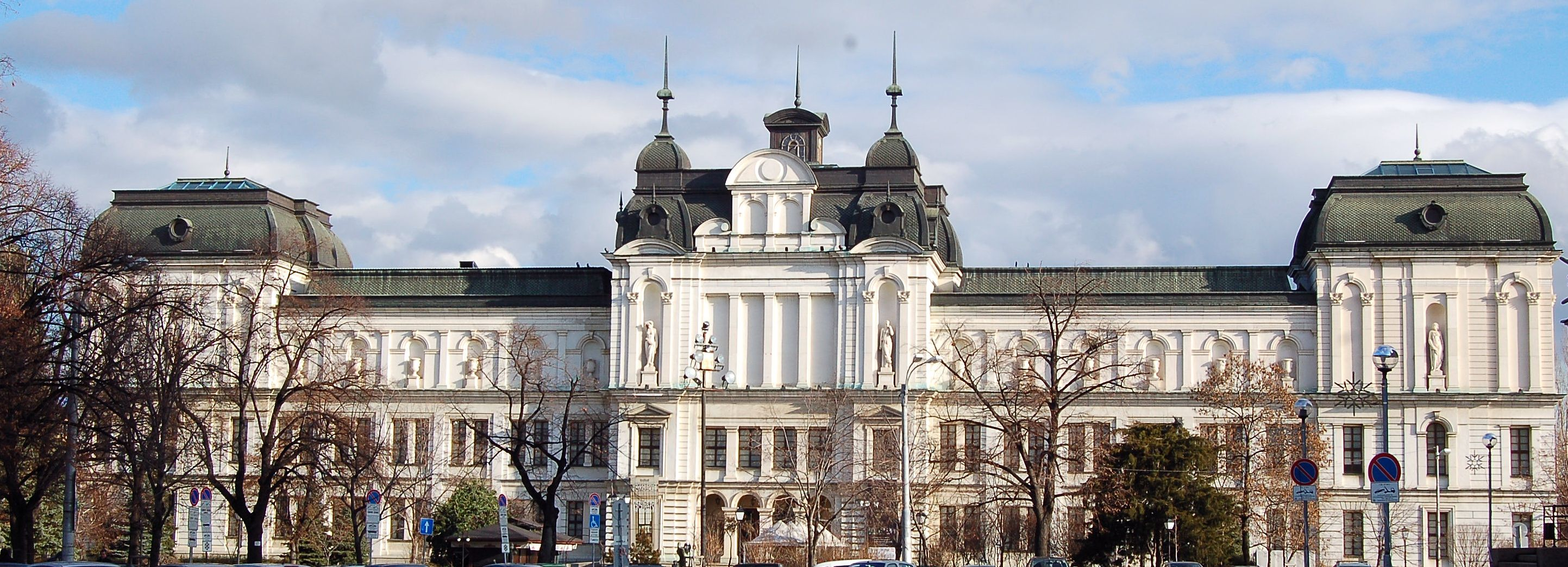
- Panoramic view over central Sofia and the Vitosha Mountain Saint Alexander Nevsky Cathedral Ivan Vazov National Theatre Largo Former Royal Palace Gallery of Foreign Art

- Flag Coat of arms
- Motto: "Расте, но не старее" "Raste, no ne staree" ("Ever growing, never ageing")
- Interactive map of Sofia
- Location of Sofia Sofia (Balkans) Sofia (Europe)
- Coordinates: 42°42′N 23°20′E
- Country: Bulgaria
- Province: Sofia City
- Municipality: Capital
- Cont. inhabited: since 7000 BC
- Neolithic settlement: 5500–6000 BC
- Serdi settlement: ca. 390 BC
- Roman administration: 46 AD (as Serdica)
- Conquered by Krum: 809 AD (as Sredets)

Government
  - Mayor: Vasil Terziev (PP-DB-Spasi Sofia)

Area
  - Capital city: 500 km^{2} (190 sq mi)
  - Urban: 5,723 km^{2} (2,210 sq mi)
  - Metro: 11,738 km^{2} (4,532 sq mi)
- Elevation: 500–699 m (1,640–2,293 ft)

Population (31-12-2025)
  - Capital city: 1,240,528
  - Rank: 1st in Bulgaria; 14th in the EU
  - Density: 2,500/km^{2} (6,400/sq mi)
  - Urban: 1,531,867
  - Urban density: 267.7/km^{2} (693.3/sq mi)
  - Metro: 1,619,690
  - Metro density: 137.99/km^{2} (357.38/sq mi)
- Demonym(s): Sofian (en); Софиянец/Sofiyanets (bg)

GDP (Nominal, 2024)
  - Capital city: €45.732 billion
  - Per capita: €35,412
- Time zone: UTC+02:00 (EET)
  - Summer (DST): UTC+03:00 (EEST)
- Postal code: 1000
- Area code: (+359) 02
- HDI (2023): 0.920 very high
- Vehicle registration plate: C, CA, CB
- Website: sofia.bg

Sofia (Note: /ˈsoʊfiə, ˈsɒf-, soʊˈfiːə/, SOH-fee-ə, SOF-, soh-FEE-yə; Bulgarian: София, romanised: Sofiya, Bulgarian pronunciation: [ˈsɔfijɐ]) is the capital and largest city of Bulgaria. It is situated in the Sofia Valley at the foot of the Vitosha mountain, in the western part of the country. The city is built west of the Iskar river and has many mineral springs, such as the Sofia Central Mineral Baths. It has a humid continental climate.

Known as Serdica in antiquity, Sofia has been an area of human habitation since at least 7000 BC. The recorded history of the city begins with the attestation of the conquest of Serdica by the Roman Republic in 29 BC from the Celtic tribe Serdi. During the decline of the Roman Empire, the city was raided by Huns, Visigoths, Avars, and Slavs. In 809, Serdica was incorporated into the First Bulgarian Empire by Khan Krum and became known as Sredets. In 1018, the Byzantines ended Bulgarian rule until 1194, when it was reincorporated by the Second Bulgarian Empire. Sredets became a major administrative, economic, cultural and literary hub until its conquest by the Ottomans in 1382. From 1530 to 1836, Sofia was the regional capital of Rumelia Eyalet, the Ottoman Empire's largest and most important province. Bulgarian rule was restored in 1878. Sofia was selected as the capital of the Third Bulgarian State in the next year, ushering a period of intense demographic and economic growth.

Sofia is the 14th-largest city in the European Union. It is surrounded by mountains including Vitosha to the south, Lyulin to the west, and the Balkan Mountains to the north. It is the fourth highest European capital after Andorra la Vella, San Marino and Madrid. Sofia is home to several universities, cultural institutions and commercial companies. The city has been described as the "triangle of religious tolerance". This is because three temples of three major world religions—Christianity, Islam and Judaism—are situated close together: Sveta Nedelya Church, Banya Bashi Mosque and Sofia Synagogue. This triangle was recently expanded to a "square" and includes the Catholic Cathedral of St Joseph.

The Boyana Church in Sofia, constructed during the Second Bulgarian Empire and holding much patrimonial symbolism to the Bulgarian Orthodox Church, was included on the World Heritage List in 1979. With its cultural significance in Southeast Europe, Sofia is home to the National Opera and Ballet of Bulgaria, the National Palace of Culture, the Vasil Levski National Stadium, the Ivan Vazov National Theatre, the National Archaeological Museum, and the Serdica Amphitheatre. The Museum of Socialist Art includes many sculptures and posters that educate visitors about the lifestyle in communist Bulgaria.

The population of Sofia declined from 70,000 in the late 18th century, through 19,000 in 1870, to 11,649 in 1878, after which it began increasing. Sofia hosts some 1.28 million residents within a territory of 500 km^{2}, a concentration of 17.9% of the country's population within the 200th percentile of the country's territory. The urban area of Sofia hosts some 1.5 million residents within 5,723 km^{2}, which comprises Sofia City Province and parts of Sofia Province (Dragoman, Slivnitsa, Kostinbrod, Bozhurishte, Svoge, Elin Pelin, Gorna Malina, Ihtiman, Kostenets) and Pernik Province (Pernik, Radomir), representing 5.16% of the country territory. The metropolitan area of Sofia is based upon one hour of car travel time, stretches internationally and includes Dimitrovgrad in Serbia. The metropolitan region of Sofia is inhabited by a population of 1.6 million.

== Names ==
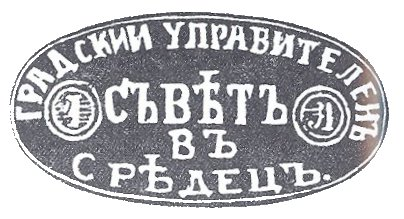
The first seal of the city, from 1878, which calls it Sredets, its name in Old Bulgarian

For a long time, the city possessed the name, Serdica (Ancient Greek: Σαρδική, Serdikē, or Σαρδική, Sardikē; Latin: Serdica or Sardica), derived from the tribe Serdi, who were either of Thracian, Celtic, or mixed Thracian-Celtic origin. The emperor Marcus Ulpius Traianus (53–117 AD) gave the city the combinative name of Ulpia Serdica; Ulpia may be derived from an Umbrian cognate of the Latin word lupus, meaning "wolf" or from the Latin vulpes (fox). It seems that the first written mention of Serdica was made during his reign and the last mention was in the 19th century in a Bulgarian text (Сардакіи, Sardaki). Other names given to Sofia, such as Serdonpolis (Byzantine Ancient Greek: Σερδῶν πόλις, "City of the Serdi") and Triaditza (Τριάδιτζα, "Trinity"), were mentioned by Byzantine Greek sources or coins. The Slavic name Sredets (Church Slavonic: Срѣдецъ), which is related to "middle" (среда, "sreda") and to the city's earliest name, first appeared on paper in an 11th-century text. The city was called Atralisa by the Arab traveller Idrisi and Strelisa, Stralitsa, or Stralitsion by the Crusaders.

The name Sofia comes from the Saint Sofia Church, as opposed to the prevailing Slavic origin of Bulgarian cities and towns. The origin is in the Greek word sophía (σοφία, "wisdom"). The earliest works where this latest name is registered are the duplicate of the Gospel of Serdica, in a dialogue between two salesmen from Dubrovnik around 1359, in the 14th-century Vitosha Charter of Bulgarian tsar Ivan Shishman and in a Ragusan merchant's notes of 1376. In these documents, the city is called Sofia, but, at the same time, the region and the city's inhabitants are still called Sredecheski (Church Slavonic: срѣдечьскои, "of Sredets"), which continued until the 20th century. The Ottomans came to favour the name Sofya (صوفيه). In 1879, there was a dispute about what the name of the new Bulgarian capital should be, when the citizens created a committee of famous people, insisting for the Slavic name. Gradually, a compromise arose, officialisation of Sofia for the nationwide institutions, while legitimating the title Sredets for the administrative and church institutions, before the latter was abandoned through the years.

== Geography ==
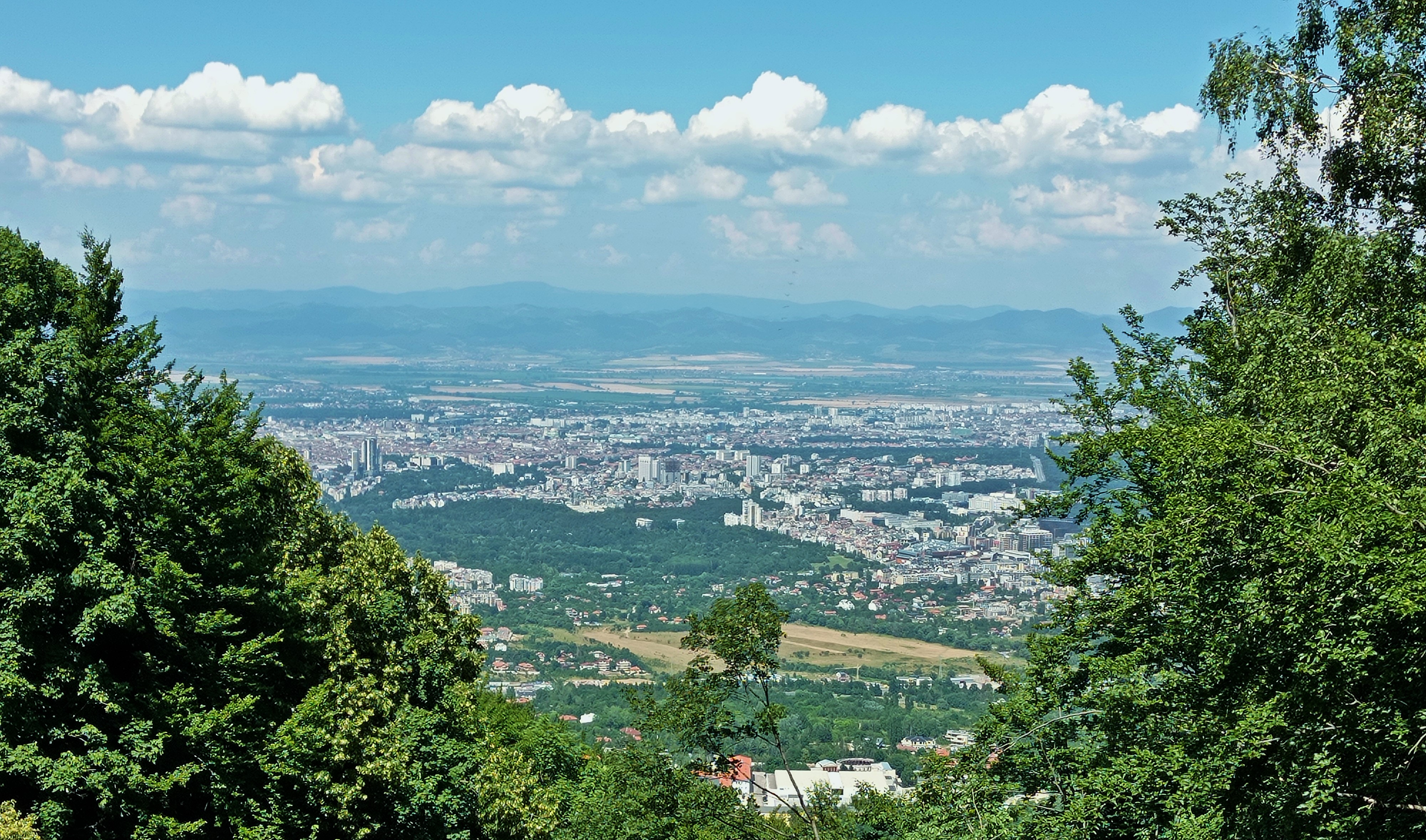
A view of Sofia and its valley from Vitosha

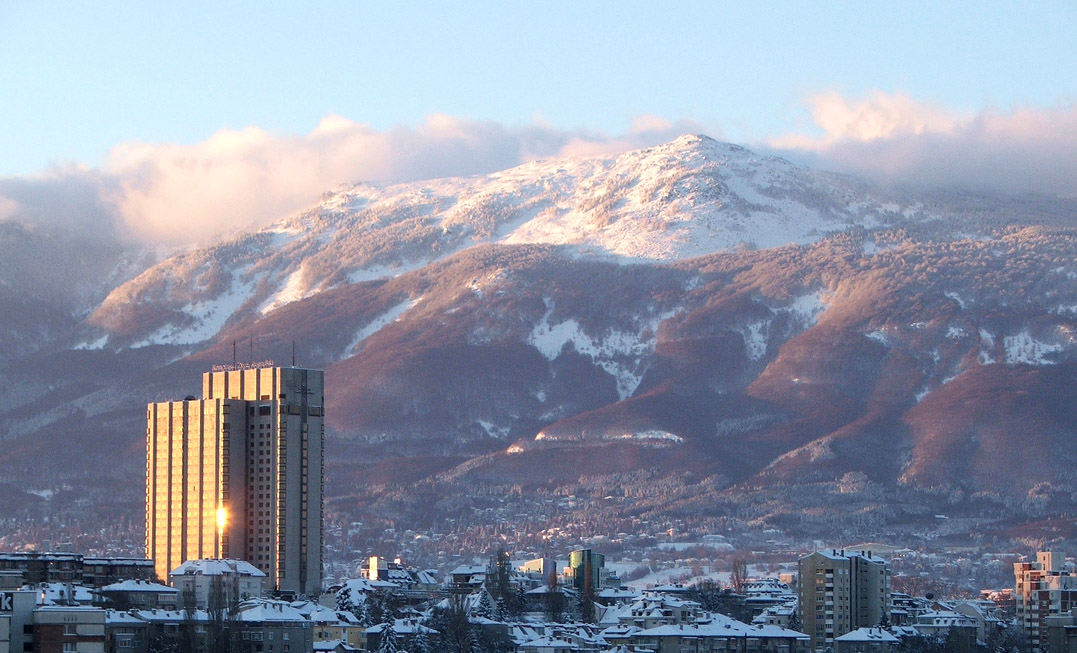
Winter panorama of Sofia with Vitosha in the background

Sofia City Province has an area of 1,344 km^{2}, while the surrounding and much bigger Sofia Province is 7,059 km^{2}. Sofia's development as a significant settlement owes much to its central position in the Balkans. It is situated in western Bulgaria, at the northern foot of the Vitosha mountain, in the Sofia Valley that is surrounded by the Balkan Mountains to the north. The valley has an average altitude of 550 metres (1,800 ft). Sofia is the second highest capital of the European Union (after Madrid) and the third highest capital of Europe (after Andorra la Vella and Madrid). Unlike most European capitals, Sofia does not straddle any large river, but is surrounded by comparatively high mountains on all sides. Three mountain passes lead to the city, which have been key roads since antiquity, Vitosha being the watershed between Black and Aegean Seas.

A number of shallow rivers cross the city, including the Boyanska, Vladayska and Perlovska. The Iskar River in its upper course flows near eastern Sofia. It takes its source in Rila, Bulgaria's highest mountain, and enters Sofia Valley near the village of German. The Iskar flows north toward the Balkan Mountains, passing between the eastern city suburbs, next to the main building and below the runways of Vasil Levski Sofia Airport, and flows out of the Sofia Valley at the town of Novi Iskar, where the scenic Iskar Gorge begins.

The city is known for its 49 mineral and thermal springs. Artificial and dam lakes were built in the twentieth century.

While the 1818 and 1858 earthquakes were intense and destructive, the 2012 Pernik earthquake occurred west of Sofia with a moment magnitude of 5.6 and a much lower Mercalli intensity of VI (Strong). The 2014 Aegean Sea earthquake was also noticed in the city.

=== Climate ===
Sofia has a humid continental climate (Köppen climate classification Dfb; Cfb if with −3 °C isotherm) with an average annual temperature of 10.9 °C (51.6 °F).

Winters are relatively cold and snowy. In the coldest days temperatures can drop below −15 °C (5 °F), most notably in January. The lowest recorded temperature is −31.2 °C (−24 °F) (16 January 1893). On average, Sofia receives a total snowfall of 98 cm (38.6 in) and 56 days with snow cover. The snowiest recorded winter was 1939/1940 with a total snowfall of 169 cm (66.5 in). The record snow depth is 57 cm (22.4 in) (25 December 2001). The coldest recorded year was 1893 with an average January temperature of −10.4 °C (13 °F) and an annual temperature of 8.2 °C (46.8 °F).

Summers are quite warm and sunny. In summer, the city generally remains slightly cooler than other parts of Bulgaria, due to its higher altitude. However, the city is also subject to heat waves with high temperatures reaching or exceeding 35 °C (95 °F) on the hottest days, particularly in July and August. The highest recorded temperature is 40.2 °C (104 °F) (5 July 2000). The hottest recorded month was July 2012 with an average temperature of 24.8 °C (77 °F). The warmest year on record was 2024 with an annual temperature of 12.5 °C (55 °F).

Springs and autumns in Sofia are usually short with variable and dynamic weather.

The city receives an average precipitation of 625.7 mm (24.63 in) a year, reaching its peak in late spring and early summer when thunderstorms are common. The driest recorded year was 2000 with a total precipitation of 304.6 mm (11.99 in), while the wettest year on record was 2014 with a total precipitation of 1,066.6 mm (41.99 in).

Climate data for Sofia (NIMH−BAS) 1991–2020 normals, extremes 1893–present
Month	Jan	Feb	Mar	Apr	May	Jun	Jul	Aug	Sep	Oct	Nov	Dec	Year
Record high °C (°F)	18 (64)	22.2 (72.0)	31 (88)	30.6 (87.1)	34.1 (93.4)	37.2 (99.0)	40.2 (104.4)	39 (102)	37.1 (98.8)	33.6 (92.5)	25.8 (78.4)	21.3 (70.3)	40.2 (104.4)
Mean daily maximum °C (°F)	3.5 (38.3)	6.5 (43.7)	11.4 (52.5)	16.7 (62.1)	21.4 (70.5)	25.2 (77.4)	27.8 (82.0)	28.3 (82.9)	23.3 (73.9)	17.6 (63.7)	10.7 (51.3)	4.6 (40.3)	16.4 (61.5)
Daily mean °C (°F)	−0.5 (31.1)	1.6 (34.9)	5.8 (42.4)	10.9 (51.6)	15.5 (59.9)	19.4 (66.9)	21.6 (70.9)	21.5 (70.7)	16.8 (62.2)	11.4 (52.5)	5.9 (42.6)	0.8 (33.4)	10.9 (51.6)
Mean daily minimum °C (°F)	−3.9 (25.0)	−2.4 (27.7)	1.1 (34.0)	5.3 (41.5)	9.8 (49.6)	13.4 (56.1)	15.3 (59.5)	15 (59)	10.9 (51.6)	6.3 (43.3)	1.9 (35.4)	−2.4 (27.7)	5.9 (42.5)
Record low °C (°F)	−31.2 (−24.2)	−24.1 (−11.4)	−18 (0)	−5.9 (21.4)	−2.2 (28.0)	2.5 (36.5)	5.3 (41.5)	3.5 (38.3)	−2 (28)	−5.6 (21.9)	−15.3 (4.5)	−21.1 (−6.0)	−31.2 (−24.2)
Average precipitation mm (inches)	35.9 (1.41)	35.5 (1.40)	45.3 (1.78)	52.3 (2.06)	73.1 (2.88)	81.6 (3.21)	64.7 (2.55)	53.1 (2.09)	52.3 (2.06)	53.9 (2.12)	38.1 (1.50)	39.9 (1.57)	625.7 (24.63)
Average snowfall cm (inches)	24.9 (9.8)	21 (8.3)	15.4 (6.1)	3 (1.2)	0 (0)	0 (0)	0 (0)	0 (0)	0 (0)	1.5 (0.6)	10.7 (4.2)	21 (8.3)	97.5 (38.5)
Average precipitation days (≥ 0.1 mm)	10	11	10	12	15	13	9	7	8	11	10	10	126
Average snowy days	7.5	6.5	5.2	1.3	0	0	0	0	0	0.7	2.7	6.4	30.3
Average relative humidity (%)	77	74	69	63	67	67	63	62	65	70	77	79	69.4
Mean monthly sunshine hours	87.9	117.2	169	195.1	236	268.1	311.9	307.3	225.1	166.8	107.7	69.1	2,261.2
Percentage possible sunshine	28	36	45	50	53	60	68	70	62	49	32	25	50
Average ultraviolet index	1	2	4	5	7	9	9	8	6	4	2	1	5
Source: NOAA/WMO, Climate.top and Weather Atlas

=== Environment ===
The geographic position of the Sofia Valley limits the flow of air masses, increasing the chances of air pollution by particulate matter and nitrogen oxide. Solid fuel used for heating and motor vehicle traffic are significant sources of pollutants. Smog thus persists over the city as temperature inversions and the mountains surrounding the city prevent the circulation of air masses. As a result, air pollution levels in Sofia are some of the highest in Europe.

Particulate matter concentrations are consistently above the norm. During the October 2017 – March 2018 heating season, particulate levels exceeded the norm on 70 occasions; on 7 January 2018, PM10 levels reached 632 μg/m^{3}, some twelve times the EU norm of 50 μg/m^{3}. Even areas with few sources of air pollution, like Gorna Banya, had PM2.5 and PM10 levels above safe thresholds. In response to hazardous spikes in air pollution, the Municipal Council implemented a variety of measures in January 2018, like more frequent washing of streets. However, a report by the European Court of Auditors issued in September 2018 revealed that Sofia has not drafted any projects to reduce air pollution from heating. The report also noted that no industrial pollution monitoring stations operate in Sofia, even though industrial facilities are active in the city. A monitoring station on Eagles' Bridge, where some of the highest particulate matter values were measured, was moved away from the location and has measured sharply lower values since then. Particulates are now largely measured by a network of 300 sensors maintained by volunteers since 2017. The European Commission has taken Bulgaria to court over its failure to curb air pollution.

== History ==
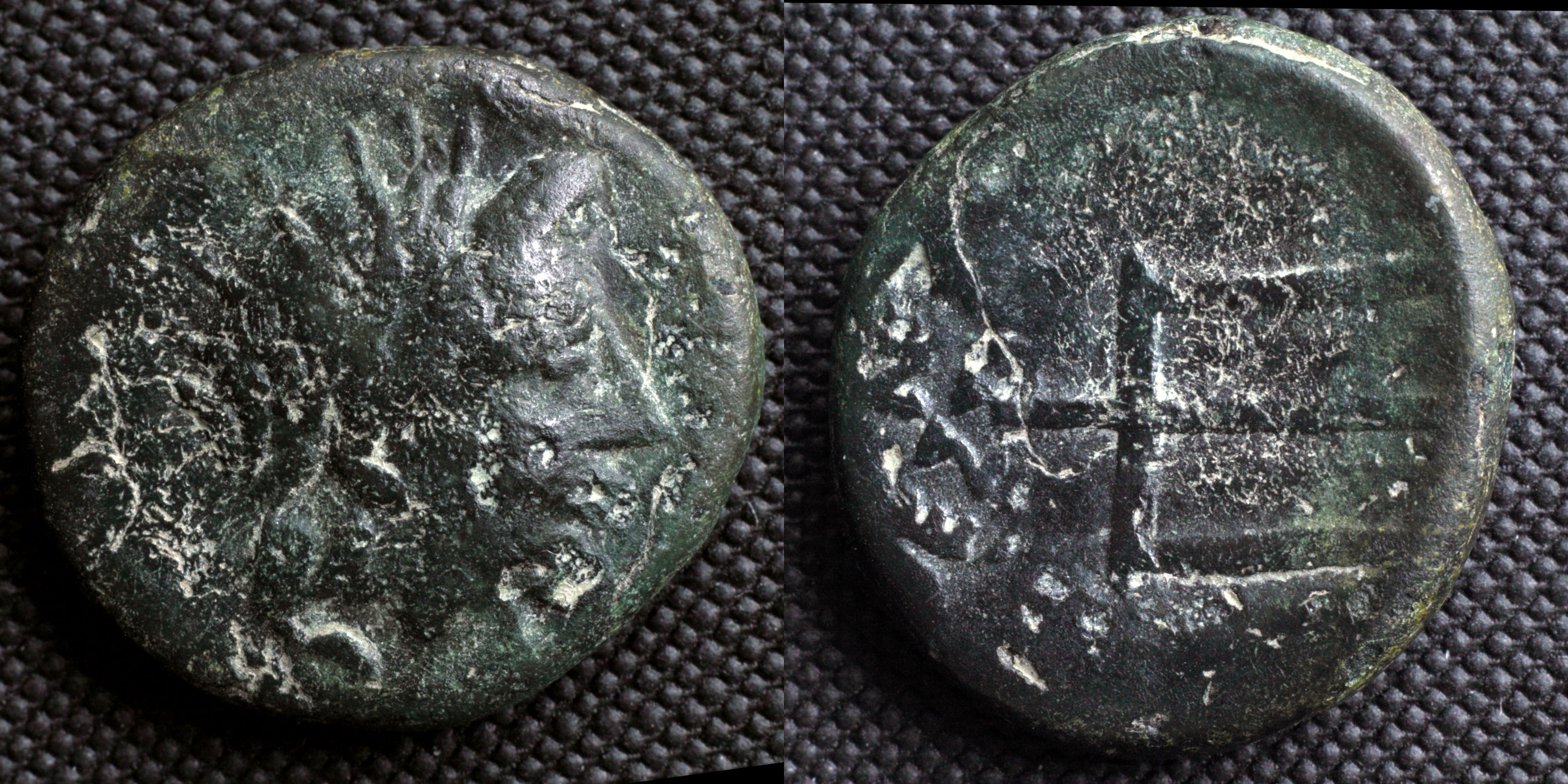
O: head of river-god Strymon; R: trident. This coin imitates Macedonian issue from 187 to 168 BC. It was struck by Serdi tribe as their own currency.

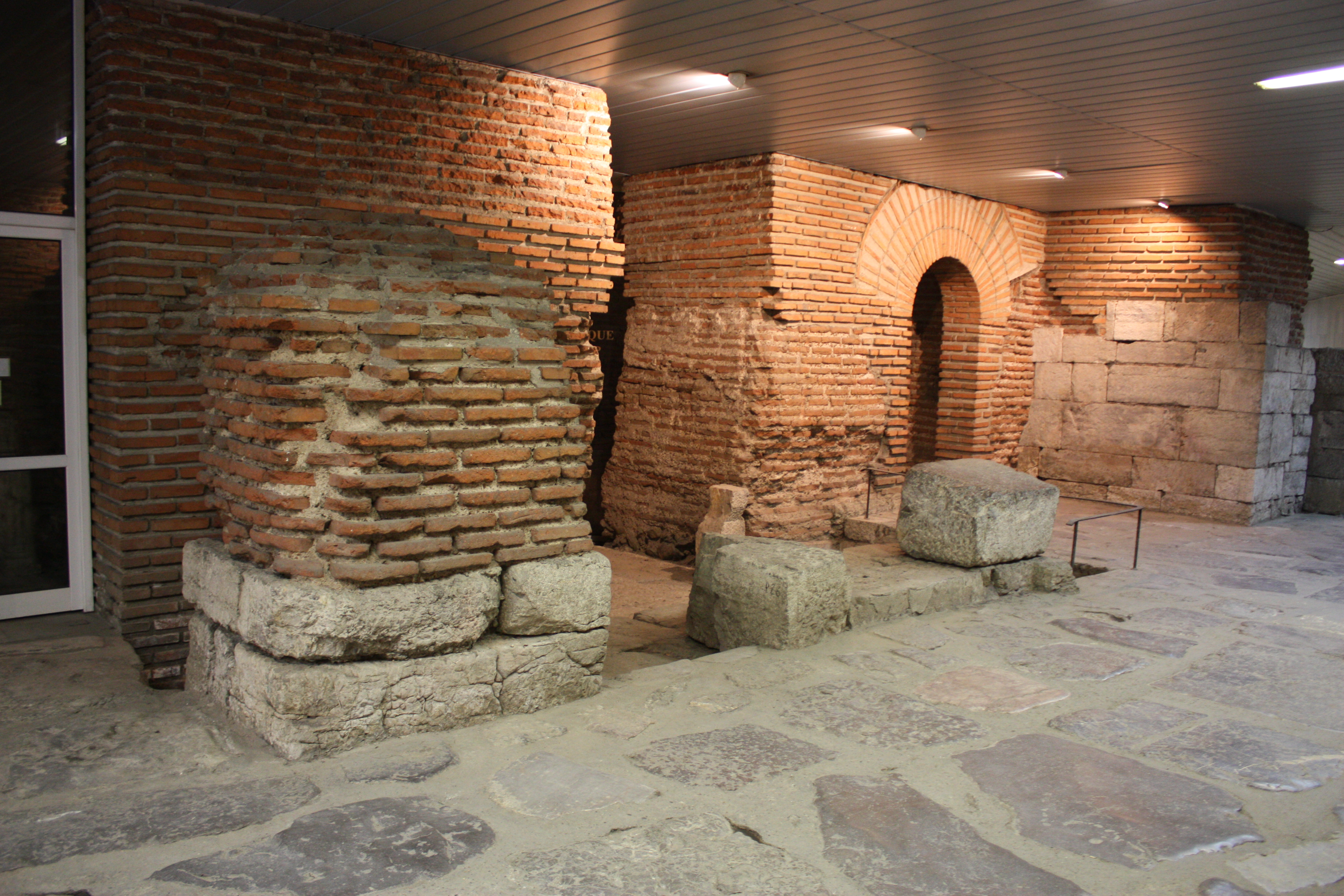
The eastern gate of Serdica in the "Complex Ancient Serdica"

=== Prehistory and antiquity ===
The area has a history of nearly 7,000 years, with the great attraction of the hot water springs that still flow abundantly in the centre of the city. The Neolithic village in Slatina dating to the 5th–6th millennium BC is documented. Another neolithic settlement was founded in the 3rd–4th millennium BC near the site of the modern National Art Gallery, which has been the traditional centre of the city ever since.

The earliest tribes who settled were the Thracian Tilataei. In the 500s BC, the area became part of a Thracian state union, the Odrysian kingdom from another Thracian tribe the Odrysses.

In 339 BC Philip II of Macedon destroyed and ravaged the town for the first time.

The Celtic tribe Serdi gave their name to the city. The earliest mention of the city comes from an Athenian inscription from the 1st century BC, attesting Astiu ton Serdon, i.e. city of the Serdi. According to the inscription and to the writings of Dio Cassius, the Roman general Crassus subdued the Serdi and behanded the captives.

Dio Cassius, Pliny the Elder and Ptolemy say that in 27–29 BC Crassus attacked the region "Segetike", which is assumed to be Serdica, or the city of the Serdi. The ancient city is located between TZUM, Sheraton Hotel and the Presidency. It gradually became the most important Roman city of the region. It became a municipium during the reign of Emperor Trajan (98–117). Serdica expanded, as turrets, protective walls, public baths, administrative and cult buildings, a civic basilica, an amphitheatre, a circus, the City council (Boulé), a large forum, a big circus (theatre), etc. were built. Serdica was a significant city on the Roman road Via Militaris, connecting Singidunum and Byzantium. In the 3rd century, it became the capital of Dacia Aureliana, and when Emperor Diocletian divided the province of Dacia Aureliana into Dacia Ripensis (at the banks of the Danube) and Dacia Mediterranea, Serdica became the capital of the latter. Serdica's citizens of Thracian descent were referred to as Illyrians probably because it was at some time the capital of Eastern Illyria (Second Illyria).

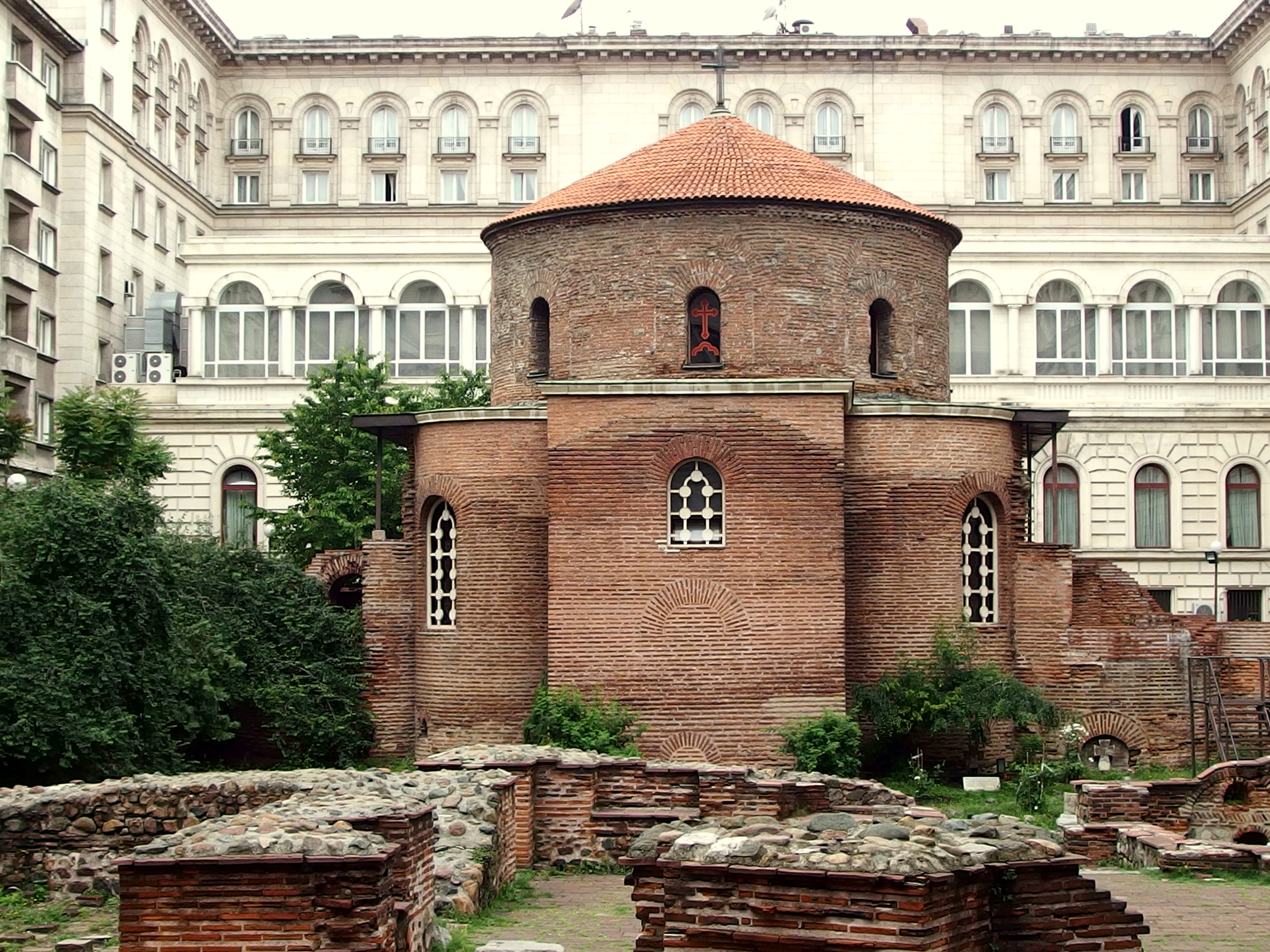
Dated from the early 4th century, the Church of Saint George is the oldest standing edifice in Sofia.

Roman emperors Aurelian (215–275) and Galerius (260–311) were born in Serdica.

The city expanded and became a significant political and economical centre, more so as it became one of the first Roman cities where Christianity was recognised as an official religion (under Galerius). The Edict of Toleration by Galerius was issued in 311 in Serdica by the Roman emperor Galerius, officially ending the Diocletianic persecution of Christianity. The Edict implicitly granted Christianity the status of "religio licita", a worship recognised and accepted by the Roman Empire. It was the first edict legalising Christianity, preceding the Edict of Milan by two years.

Serdica was the capital of the Diocese of Dacia (337–602).

For Constantine the Great it was 'Sardica mea Roma est' (Serdica is my Rome). He considered making Serdica the capital of the Byzantine Empire instead of Constantinople. which was already not dissimilar to a tetrarchic capital of the Roman Empire. In 343 AD, the Council of Sardica was held in the city, in a church located where the current 6th century Church of Saint Sophia was later built.

The city was destroyed in the 447 invasion of the Huns and laid in ruins for a century. It was rebuilt by Byzantine Emperor Justinian I. During the reign of Justinian it flourished, being surrounded with great fortress walls whose remnants can still be seen today.

=== Middle Ages ===
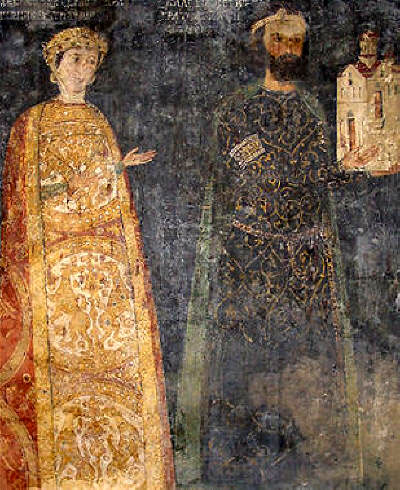
The 13th century lord of Sredets Kaloyan and his wife Desislava, Boyana Church

Serdica became part of the First Bulgarian Empire during the reign of Khan Krum in 809, after a long siege. The fall of the strategic city prompted a major and ultimately disastrous invasion of Bulgaria by the Byzantine emperor Nikephoros I, which led to his demise at the hands of the Bulgarian army. In the aftermath of the war, the city was permanently integrated in Bulgaria and became known by the Slavic name of Sredets. It grew into an important fortress and administrative centre under Krum's successor Khan Omurtag, who made it a centre of Sredets province (Sredetski komitat, Средецки комитат). The Bulgarian patron saint John of Rila was buried in Sredets by orders of Emperor Peter I in the mid 10th century. After the conquest of the Bulgarian capital Preslav by Sviatoslav I of Kyiv and John I Tzimiskes' armies in 970–971, the Bulgarian Patriarch Damyan chose Sredets for his seat in the next year and the capital of Bulgaria was temporarily moved there. In the second half of 10th century the city was ruled by Komit Nikola and his sons, known as the "Komitopuli". One of them was Samuil, who was eventually crowned Emperor of Bulgaria in 997. In 986, the Byzantine Emperor Basil II laid siege to Sredets but after 20 days of fruitless assaults the garrison broke out and forced the Byzantines to abandon the campaign. On his way to Constantinople, Basil II was ambushed and soundly defeated by the Bulgarians in the battle of the Gates of Trajan.

The city eventually fell to the Byzantine Empire in 1018, following the Byzantine conquest of Bulgaria. Sredets joined the uprising of Peter Delyan in 1040–1041 in a failed attempt to restore Bulgarian independence and was the last stronghold of the rebels, led by the local commander Botko. During the 11th century many Pechenegs were settled down in Sofia region as Byzantine federats.

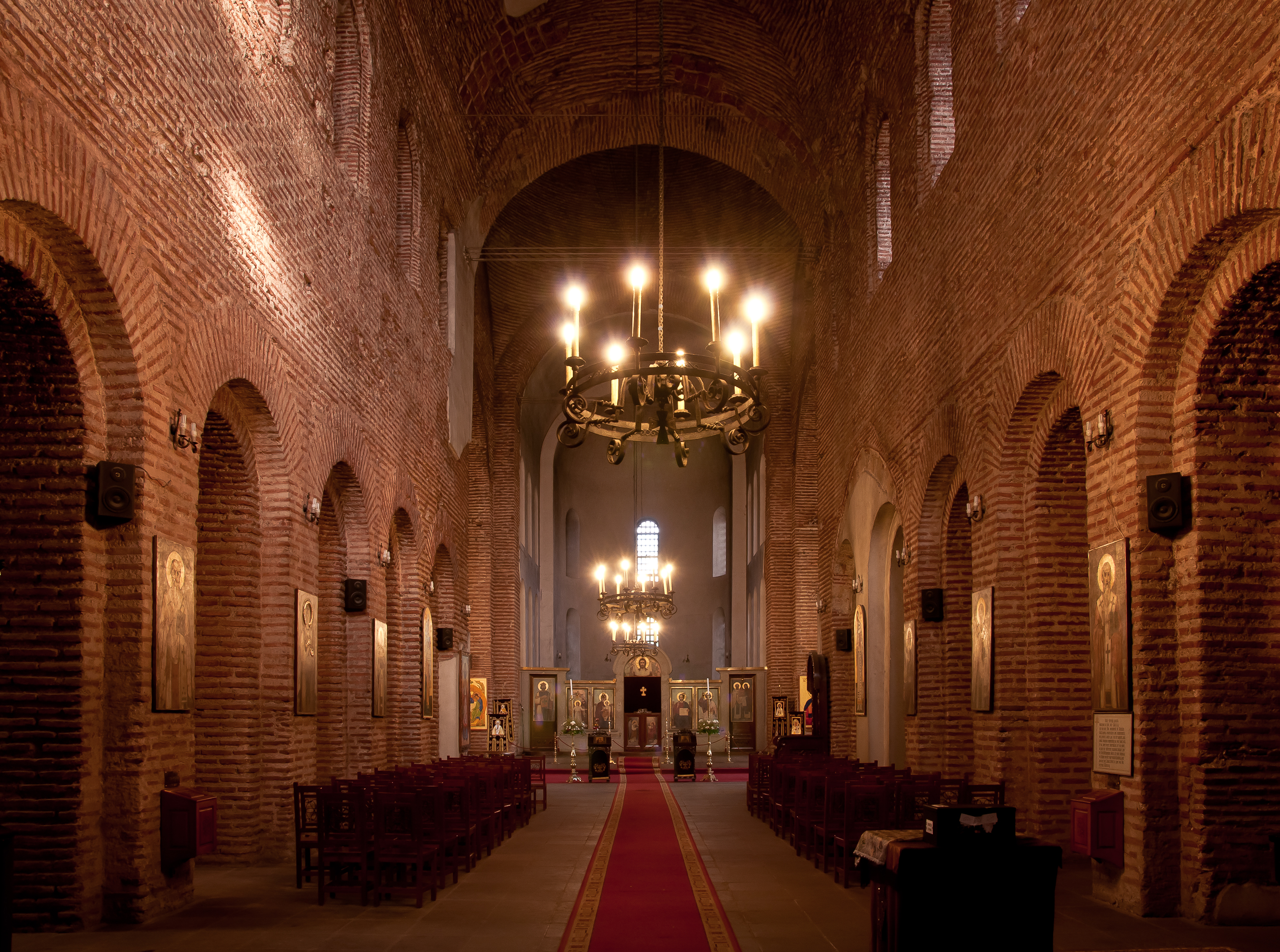
Interior of the ancient Saint Sofia Church

It was once again incorporated into the restored Bulgarian Empire in 1194 at the time of Emperor Ivan Asen I and became a major administrative and cultural centre. Several of the city's governors were members of the Bulgarian imperial family and held the title of sebastokrator, the second highest at the time, after the tsar. Some known holders of the title were Kaloyan, Peter and their relative Aleksandar Asen (d. after 1232), a son of Ivan Asen I of Bulgaria (r. 1189–1196). In the 13th and 14th centuries Sredets was an important spiritual and literary hub with a cluster of 14 monasteries in its vicinity, that were eventually destroyed by the Ottomans. The city produced multicoloured sgraffito ceramics, jewellery and ironware.

In 1382/1383 or 1385, Sredets was seized by the Ottoman Empire in the course of the Bulgarian-Ottoman Wars by Lala Şahin Pasha, following a three-month siege. The Ottoman commander left the following description of the city garrison: "Inside the fortress [Sofia] there is a large and elite army, its soldiers are heavily built, moustached and look war-hardened, but are used to consume wine and rakia—in a word, jolly fellows."

=== Early modern history ===
From the 14th century till the 19th century Sofia was an important administrative centre in the Ottoman Empire. It became the capital of the beylerbeylik of Rumelia (Rumelia Eyalet), the province that administered the Ottoman lands in Europe (the Balkans), one of the two together with the beylerbeylik of Anatolia. It was the capital of the important Sanjak of Sofia as well, including the whole of Thrace with Plovdiv and Edirne, and part of Macedonia with Thessaloniki and Skopje.

During the initial stages of the Crusade of Varna in 1443, it was occupied by Hungarian forces for a short time in 1443, and the Bulgarian population celebrated a Mass in Saint Sofia Church. Following the defeat of the crusader forces in 1444, the city's Christians faced persecution. In 1530 Sofia became the capital of the Ottoman province (beylerbeylik) of Rumelia for about three centuries. During that time Sofia was the largest import-export-base in modern-day Bulgaria for the caravan trade with the Republic of Ragusa. In the 15th and 16th century, Sofia was expanded by Ottoman building activity. Public investments in infrastructure, education and local economy brought greater diversity to the city. Amongst others, the population consisted of Muslims, Bulgarian and Greek speaking Orthodox Christians, Armenians, Georgians, Catholic Ragusans, Jews (Romaniote, Ashkenazi and Sephardi), and Romani people. The 16th century was marked by a wave of persecutions against the Bulgarian Christians, a total of nine became New Martyrs in Sofia and were sainted by the Orthodox Church, including George the New (1515), Sophronius of Sofia (1515), George the Newest (1530), Nicholas of Sofia (1555) and Terapontius of Sofia (1555).

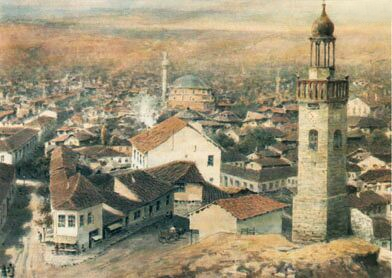
Sofia in mid-19th-century

When it comes to the cityscape, 16th century sources mention eight Friday mosques, three public libraries, numerous schools, 12 churches, three synagogues, and the largest bedesten (market) of the Balkans. Additionally, there were fountains and hammams (bathhouses). Lady Mary Wortley Montagu noted that the baths were a public gathering place for Sofia's prominent women and served as a kind of salon. Most prominent churches such as Saint Sofia and Saint George were converted into mosques, and a number of new ones were constructed, including Banya Bashi Mosque built by the Ottoman architect Mimar Sinan. In total there were 11 big and over 100 small mosques by the 17th century. In 1610 the Vatican established the See of Sofia for Catholics of Rumelia, which existed until 1715 when most Catholics had emigrated. There was an important uprising against Ottoman rule in Sofia, Samokov and Western Bulgaria in 1737.

Sofia entered a period of economic and political decline in the 17th century, accelerated during the period of anarchy in the Ottoman Balkans of the late 18th and early 19th century, when local Ottoman warlords ravaged the countryside. 1831 Ottoman population statistics show that 42% of the Christians were non-taxpayers in the kaza of Sofia and the amount of middle-class and poor Christians were equal. Since the 18th century the beylerbeys of Rumelia often stayed in Bitola, which became the official capital of the province in 1826. Sofia remained the seat of a sanjak (district). By the 19th century the Bulgarian population had two schools and seven churches, contributing to the Bulgarian National Revival. In 1858 Nedelya Petkova created the first Bulgarian school for women in the city. In 1867 was inaugurated the first chitalishte in Sofia – a Bulgarian cultural institution. In 1870 the Bulgarian revolutionary Vasil Levski established a revolutionary committee in the city and in the neighbouring villages. Following his capture in 1873, Vasil Levski was transferred and hanged in Sofia by the Ottomans.

=== Modern and contemporary history ===
During the Russo-Turkish War of 1877–78, Suleiman Pasha threatened to burn the city in defence, but the foreign diplomats Leandre Legay, Vito Positano, Rabbi Gabriel Almosnino and Josef Valdhart refused to leave the city thus saving it. Many Bulgarian residents of Sofia armed themselves and sided with the Russian forces. Sofia was relieved (see Battle of Sofia) from Ottoman rule by Russian forces under Gen. Iosif Gurko on 4 January 1878. It was proposed as a capital by Marin Drinov and was accepted as such on 3 April 1879. By the time of its liberation, the population of the city was 11,649.

Most mosques in Sofia were destroyed in that war, seven of them destroyed in one night in December 1878 when a thunderstorm masked the noise of the explosions arranged by Russian military engineers. Following the war, the great majority of the Muslim population left Sofia.

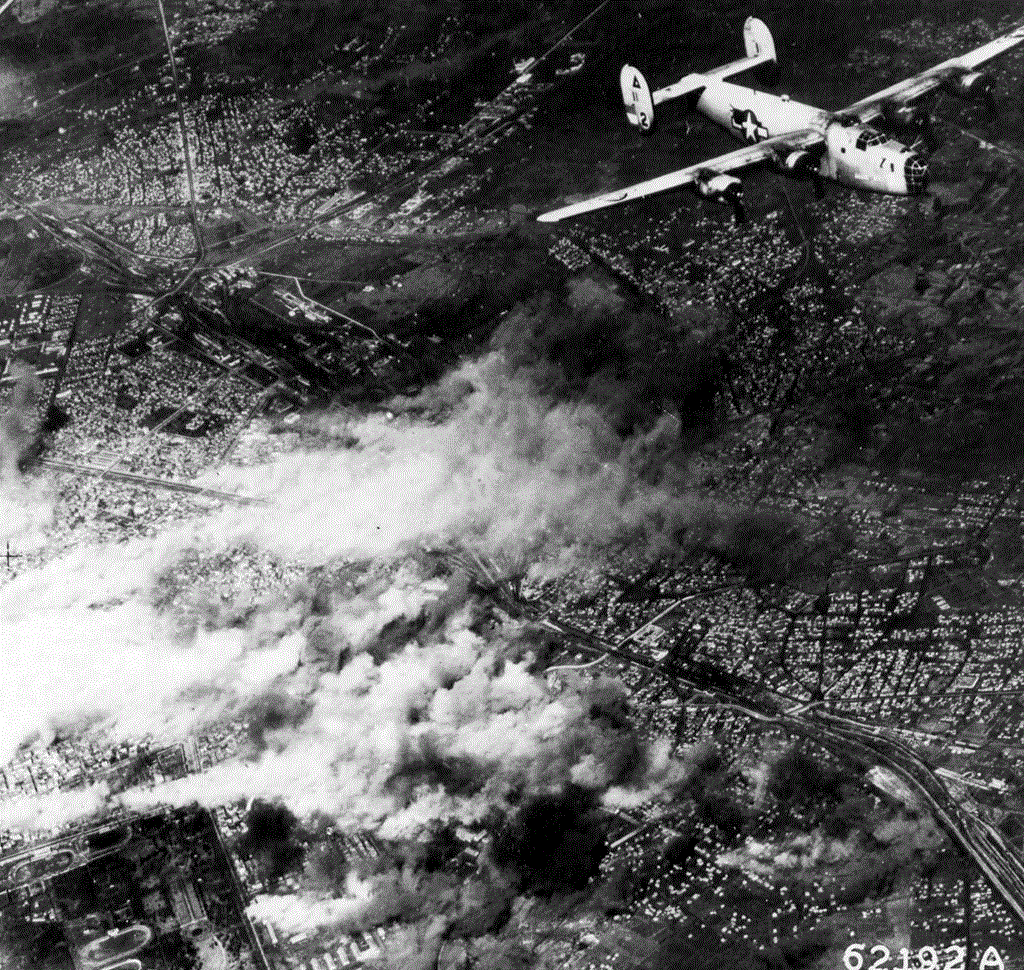
The allied bombing of Sofia in World War II in 1944

For a few decades after the liberation, Sofia experienced large population growth, mainly by migration from other regions of the Principality (Kingdom since 1908) of Bulgaria, and from the still Ottoman Macedonia and Thrace.

In 1900, the first electric lightbulb in the city was turned on.

In the Second Balkan War, Bulgaria was fighting alone practically all of its neighbouring countries. When the Romanian Army entered Vrazhdebna in 1913, then a village 11 kilometres (7 miles) from Sofia, now a suburb, this prompted the Tsardom of Bulgaria to capitulate. During the war, Sofia was overflown by the Romanian Air Corps, which engaged on photoreconnaissance operations and threw propaganda pamphlets to the city. Thus, Sofia became the first capital on the world to be overflown by enemy aircraft.

During the Second World War, Bulgaria declared war on the US and UK on 13 December 1941 and in late 1943 and early 1944 the US and UK Air forces conducted bombings over Sofia. As a consequence of the bombings thousands of buildings were destroyed or damaged including the Capital Library and thousands of books. In 1944 Sofia and the rest of Bulgaria was occupied by the Soviet Red Army and within days of the Soviet invasion Bulgaria declared war on Nazi Germany.

In 1945, the communist Fatherland Front took power. The transformations of Bulgaria into the People's Republic of Bulgaria in 1946 and into the Republic of Bulgaria in 1990 marked significant changes in the city's appearance. The population of Sofia expanded rapidly due to migration from rural regions. New residential areas were built in the outskirts of the city, like Druzhba, Mladost and Lyulin.

During the Communist Party rule, a number of the city's most emblematic streets and squares were renamed for ideological reasons, with the original names restored after 1989.

The Georgi Dimitrov Mausoleum, where Dimitrov's body had been preserved in a similar way to the Lenin mausoleum, was demolished in 1999.

== Cityscape ==
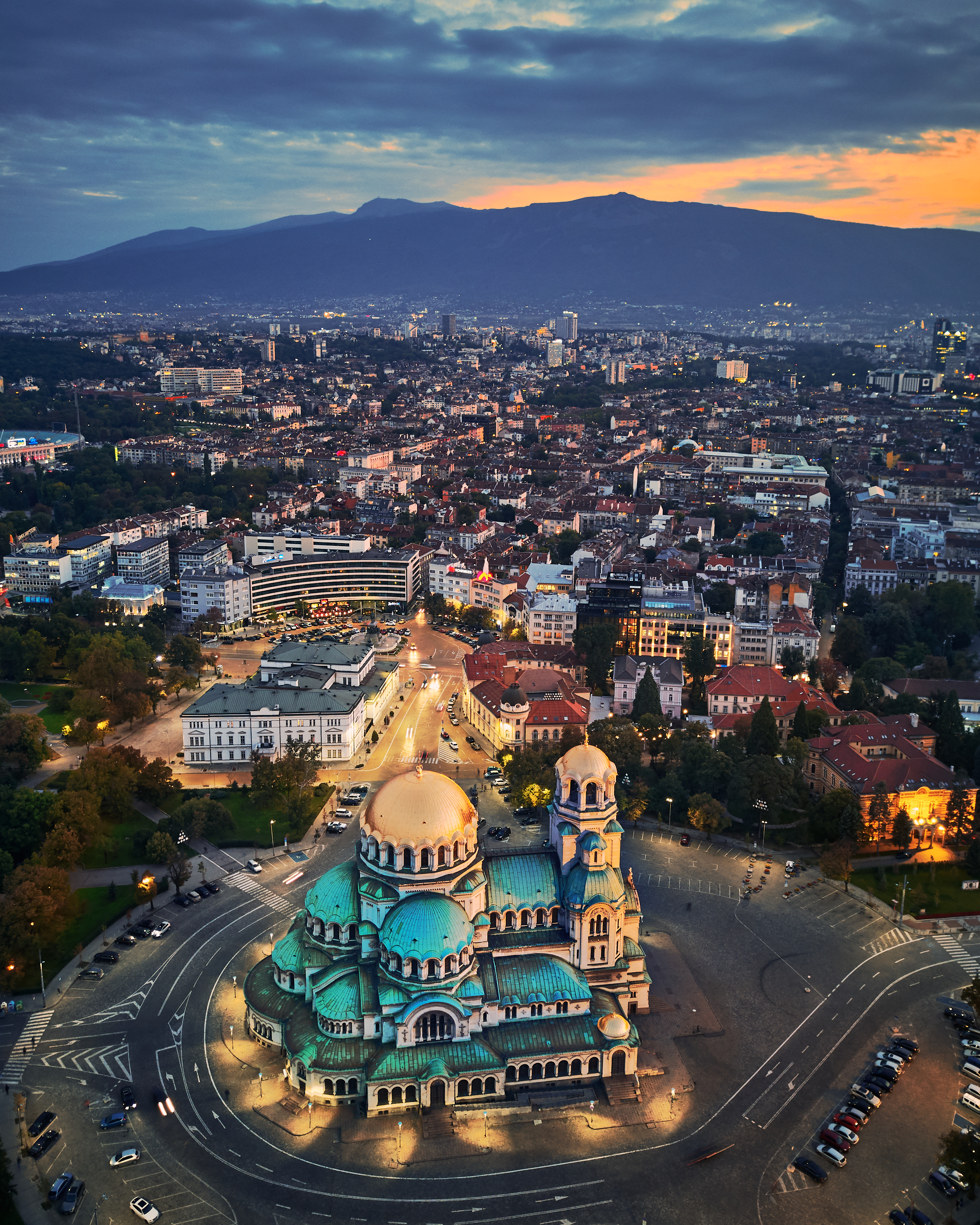
A view over central Sofia, with the Alexander Nevsky Cathedral in the foreground and Vitosha in the distance

In Sofia there are 607,473 dwellings and 101,696 buildings. According to modern records, 39,551 dwellings were constructed until 1949, 119,943 between 1950 and 1969, 287,191 between 1970 and 1989, 57,916 in the 90s and 102,623 between 2000 and 2011. Until 1949, 13,114 buildings were constructed and between 10,000 and 20,000 in each following decade. Sofia's architecture combines a wide range of architectural styles, some of which are aesthetically incompatible. These vary from Christian Roman architecture and medieval Bulgarian fortresses to Neoclassicism and prefabricated Socialist-era apartment blocks, as well as newer glass buildings and international architecture. A number of ancient Roman, Byzantine and medieval Bulgarian buildings are preserved in the centre of the city. These include the 4th century Rotunda of St. George, the walls of the Serdica fortress and the partially preserved Amphitheatre of Serdica.

After the Liberation War, knyaz Alexander Battenberg invited architects from Austria-Hungary to shape the new capital's architectural appearance.

Among the architects invited to work in Bulgaria were Friedrich Grünanger, Adolf Václav Kolář, and Viktor Rumpelmayer, who designed the most important public buildings needed by the newly re-established Bulgarian government, as well as numerous houses for the country's elite. Later, many foreign-educated Bulgarian architects also contributed. The architecture of Sofia's centre is thus a combination of Neo-Baroque, Neo-Rococo, Neo-Renaissance and Neoclassicism, with the Vienna Secession also later playing an important part, but it is most typically Central European.

After World War II and the establishment of a Communist government in Bulgaria in 1944, the architectural style was substantially altered. Stalinist Gothic public buildings emerged in the centre, notably the spacious government complex around The Largo, Vasil Levski Stadium, the Cyril and Methodius National Library and others. As the city grew outwards, the then-new neighbourhoods were dominated by many concrete tower blocks, prefabricated panel apartment buildings and examples of Brutalist architecture.

After the abolition of Communism in 1989, Sofia witnessed the construction of whole business districts and neighbourhoods, as well as modern skyscraper-like glass-fronted office buildings, but also top-class residential neighbourhoods. The 126-metre (413 ft) Capital Fort Business Centre is the first skyscraper in Bulgaria, with its 36 floors. However, the end of the old administration and centrally planned system also paved the way for chaotic and unrestrained construction, which continues today.

=== Green areas ===
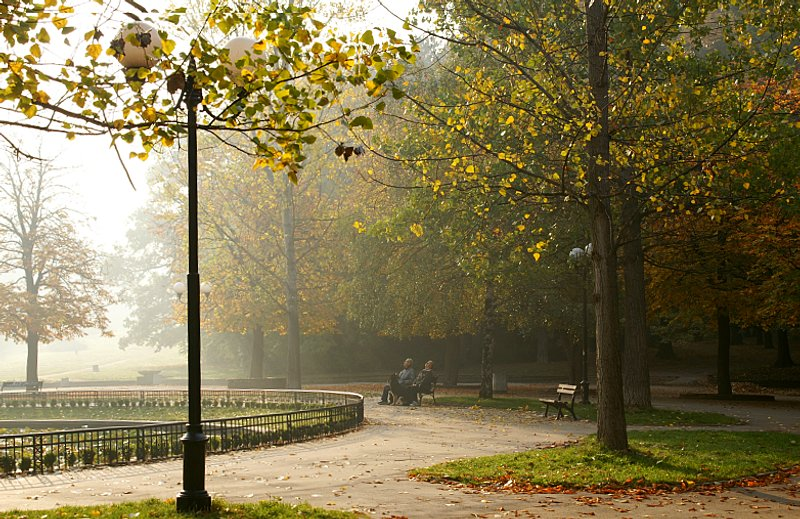
Borisova gradina

The city has an extensive green belt. Some of the neighbourhoods constructed after 2000 are densely built up and lack green spaces. There are four principal parks – Borisova gradina in the city centre and the Southern, Western and Northern parks. Several smaller parks, among which the Vazrazhdane Park, Zaimov Park, City Garden and the Doctors' Garden, are located in central Sofia. The Vitosha Nature Park (the oldest national park in the Balkans) includes most of Vitosha mountain and covers an area of 266 square kilometres (103 sq mi), with roughly half of it lying within the municipality of Sofia. Vitosha mountain is a popular hiking destination due to its proximity and ease of access via car and public transport. Two functioning cable cars provide year long access from the outskirts of the city. The mountain offers favourable skiing conditions during the winter. During the 1970s and the 1980s multiple ski slopes of varying difficulty were made available. Skiing equipment can be rented and skiing lessons are available. However, due to the bad communication between the private offshore company that runs the resort and Sofia municipality, most of the ski areas have been left to decay in the last 10 years, so that only one chairlift and one slope work.

== Government and law ==
=== Local government ===
Composition of the City Council
Party	61 Seats
PP-DB	23
GERB	14
Bulgarian Socialist Party	9
Revival	7
KOD	3
ITN	3
VMRO	1
Independent	1
Total votes: 329 027; 2023 Bulgarian local elections

A map of the 24 districts of Sofia

Sofia Municipality is identical to Sofia City Province, which is distinct from Sofia Province, which surrounds but does not include the capital itself. Besides the city proper, the 24 districts of Sofia Municipality encompass three other towns and 34 villages.

The common head of Sofia Municipality and all the 38 settlements is the mayor of Sofia. The first directly elected mayor of Sofia was Alexander Yanchulev, who was elected on 13 October 1991 and served from 1991 until 1995. Prior to Yanchulev, all previous mayors of Sofia had been either appointed or elected by the city's municipal councils. Districts and settlements have their own mayor who is elected in a popular election. The assembly members are chosen every four years.

The current incumbent mayor Vasil Terziev is serving his first term, having won the 2023 election as the nominee of the PP-DB coalition and the local Save Sofia party. After winning the first round of the election without receiving the majority of votes, Terziev entered a tight runoff against BSP candidate Vanya Grigorova, which he won with 175,044 votes, compared to Grigorova's 170,258.

#	District	km^{2}	Pop.	Density (/km^{2})	Extent	Mayor
1	Sredets	3	32,423	10,807	City	PP-DB
2	Krasno selo	7	83,552	11,936	City	PP-DB
3	Vazrazhdane	3	37,303	12,434	City	PP-DB
4	Oborishte	3	31,060	10,353	City	PP-DB
5	Serdika	18	46,949	2,608	City	PP-DB
6	Poduyane	11	76,672	6,970	City	PP-DB
7	Slatina	13	66,702	5,130	City	PP-DB
8	Izgrev	5	30,896	6,179	City	PP-DB
9	Lozenets	9	53,080	5,897	City	PP-DB
10	Triaditsa	10	63,451	6,345	City	PP-DB
11	Krasna polyana	9	58,234	6,470	City	PP-DB
12	Ilinden	3	33,236	11,078	City	PP-DB
13	Nadezhda	19	67,905	3,573	City	GERB
14	Iskar	26	63,248	2,432	City/satellites	PP-DB
15	Mladost	17	102,899	6,052	City	PP-DB
16	Studentski	9	71,961	7,995	City	Independent
17	Vitosha	123	61,467	499	City/satellites	PP-DB
18	Ovcha kupel	42	54,320	1,293	City/satellites	PP-DB
19	Lyulin	22	114,910	5,223	City	PP-DB
20	Vrabnitsa	44	47,969	1,090	City/satellites	PP-DB
21	Novi Iskar	220	28,991	131	Satellites	Independent
22	Kremikovtsi	256	23,641	92	City/satellites	PP-DB
23	Pancharevo	407	28,586	70	Satellites	GERB
24	Bankya	53	12,136	228	Satellites	GERB
	TOTAL	1342	1,291,591	962		

=== National government ===
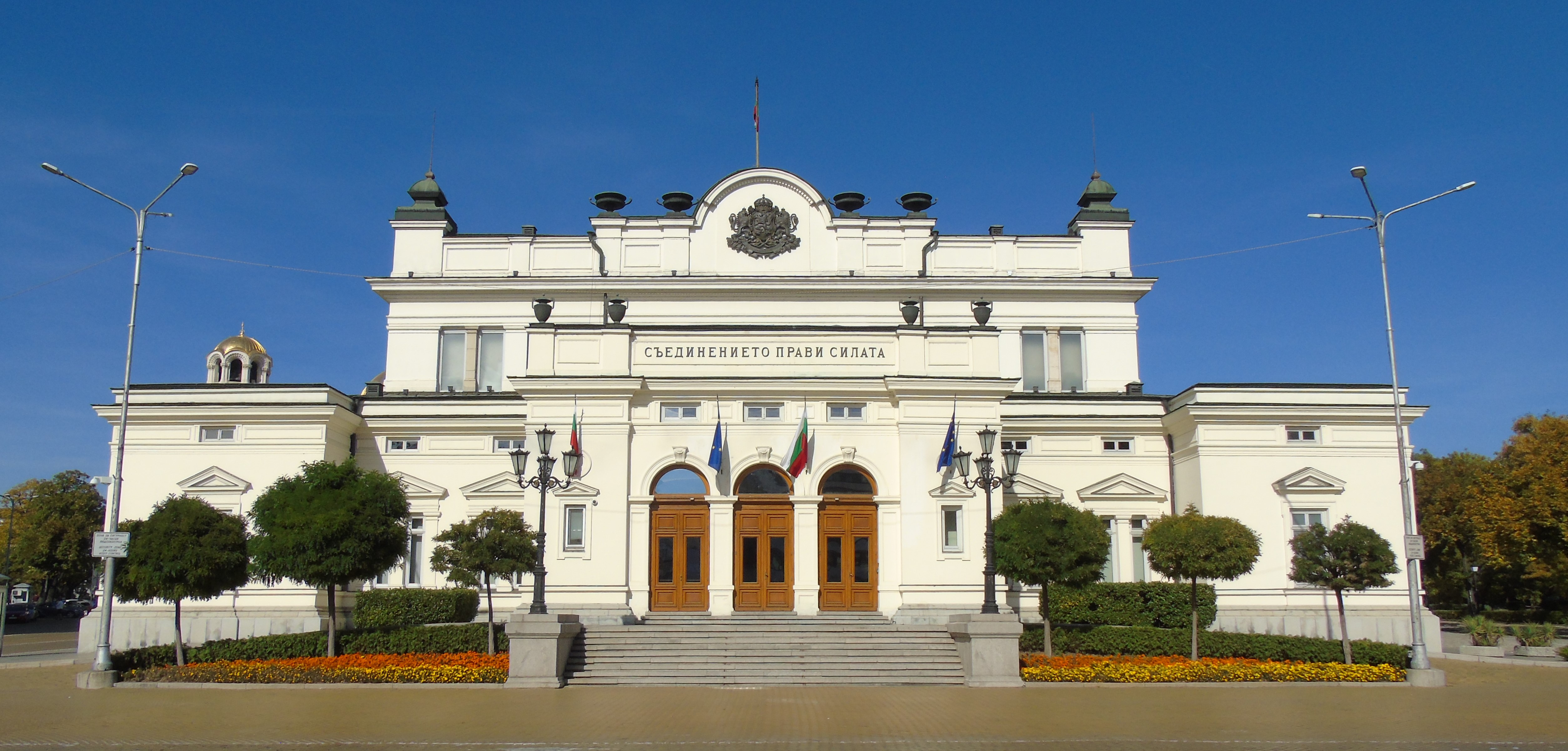
The National Assembly building

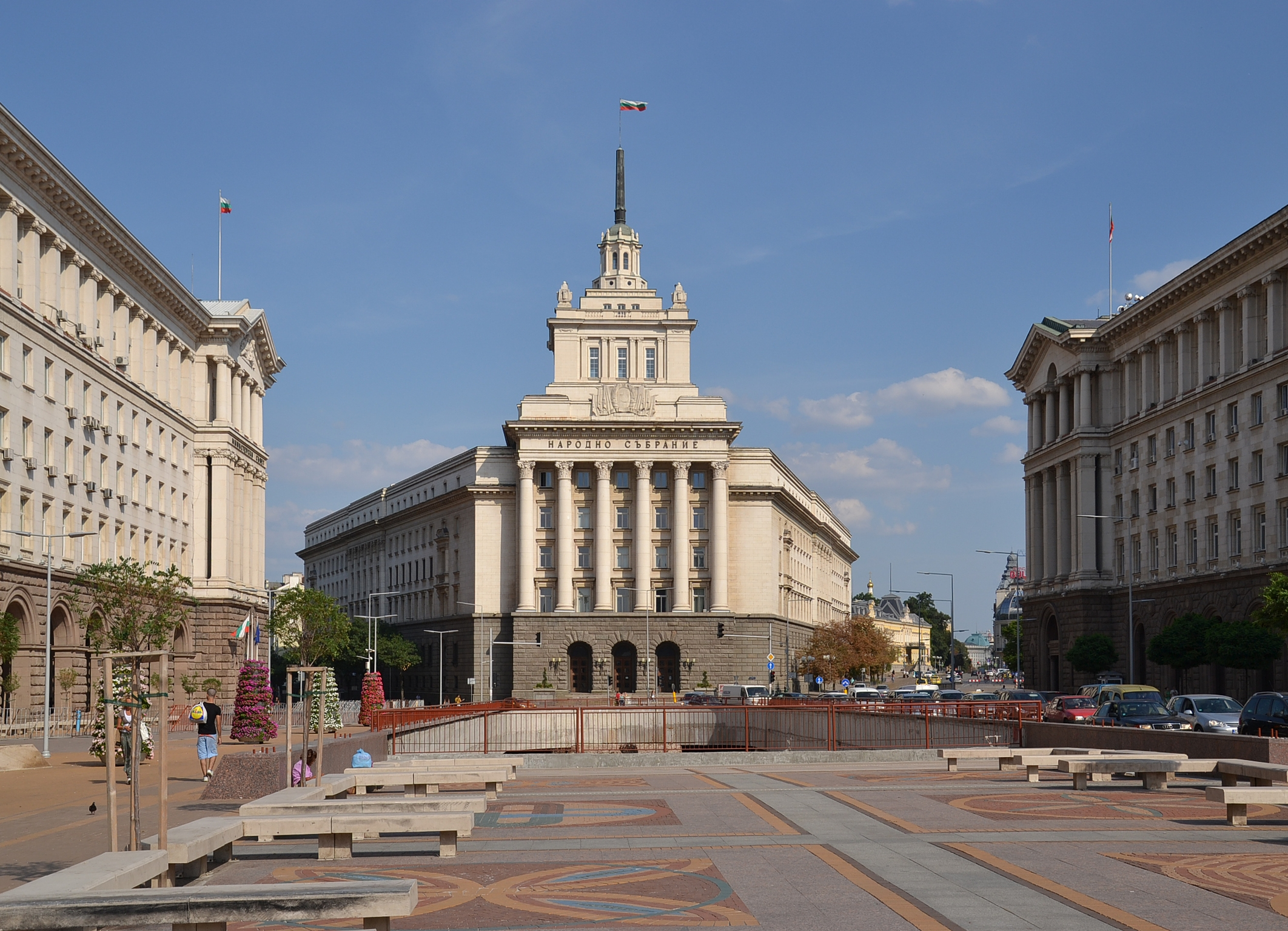
The Council of Ministers (left), Presidency (right) and the former Communist Party House

Sofia is the seat of the executive (Council of Ministers), legislative (National Assembly) and judiciary (Supreme Court and Constitutional Court) bodies of Bulgaria, as well as all government agencies, ministries, the National Bank, and the delegation of the European Commission. The President, along with the Council of Ministers, is located on Independence Square, also known as The Largo or The Triangle of Power. One of the three buildings in the architectural ensemble, the former Bulgarian Communist Party headquarters, is due to become the seat of the Parliament. A refurbishment project is due to be completed in mid-2019, while the old National Assembly building will become a museum or will only host ceremonial political events.

Under Bulgaria's centralised political system, Sofia concentrates much of the political and financial resources of the country. It is the only city in Bulgaria to host three electoral constituencies: the 23rd, 24th and 25th Multi-member Constituencies, which together field 42 mandates in the 240-member National Assembly.

=== Crime ===
With a murder rate of 1.7/per 100.000 people (as of 2009) Sofia is a relatively safe capital city. Nevertheless, in the 21st century, crimes, including Bulgarian mafia killings, caused problems in the city, where authorities had difficulties convicting the actors, which had caused the European Commission to warn the Bulgarian government that the country would not be able to join the EU unless it curbed crime (Bulgaria eventually joined in 2007). Many of the most severe crimes are contract killings that are connected to organised crime, but these had dropped in recent years after several arrests of gang members. Corruption in Bulgaria also affects Sofia's authorities. According to the director of Sofia District Police Directorate, the largest share of the crimes are thefts, making up 62.4% of all crimes in the capital city. Increasing are frauds, drug-related crimes, petty theft and vandalism. According to a survey, almost a third of Sofia's residents say that they never feel safe in the Bulgarian capital, while 20% always feel safe. As of 2015, the consumer-reported perceived crime risk on the Numbeo database was "high" for theft and vandalism and "low" for violent crimes; safety while walking during daylight was rated "very high", and "moderate" during the night. With 1,600 prisoners, the incarceration rate is above 0.1%; however, roughly 70% of all prisoners are part of the Romani minority.

== Culture ==
=== Arts and entertainment ===
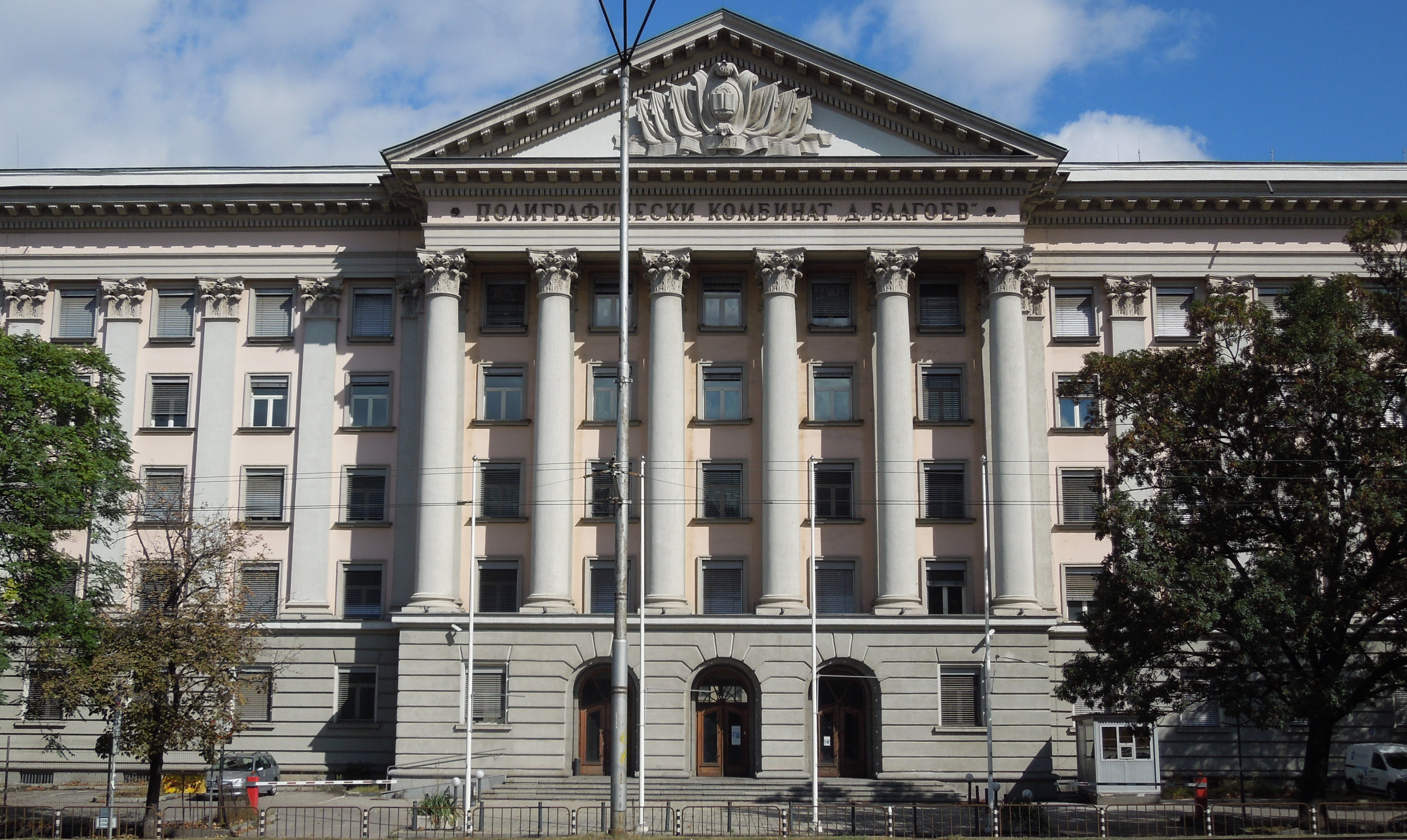
Neoclassical architecture, Polygraphia office centre

Sofia concentrates the majority of Bulgaria's leading performing arts troupes. Theatre is by far the most popular form of performing art, and theatrical venues are among the most visited, second only to cinemas. There were 3,162 theatric performances with 570,568 people attending in 2014. The Ivan Vazov National Theatre, which performs mainly classical plays and is situated in the very centre of the city, is the most prominent theatre. The National Opera and Ballet of Bulgaria is a combined opera and ballet collective established in 1891. Regular performances began in 1909. Some of Bulgaria's most famous operatic singers, such as Nicolai Ghiaurov and Ghena Dimitrova, made their first appearances on the stage of the National Opera and Ballet.

Cinema is the most popular form of entertainment: there were more than 141,000 film shows with a total attendance exceeding 2,700,000 in 2014. Over the past two decades, numerous independent cinemas have closed and most shows are in shopping centre multiplexes. Odeon (not part of the Odeon Cinemas chain) shows exclusively European and independent American films, as well as 20th century classics. The Boyana Film studios was at the centre of a once-thriving domestic film industry, which declined significantly after 1990. Nu Image acquired the studios to upgrade them into Nu Boyana Film Studios, used to shoot scenes for a number of action movies like The Expendables 2, Rambo: Last Blood and London Has Fallen.

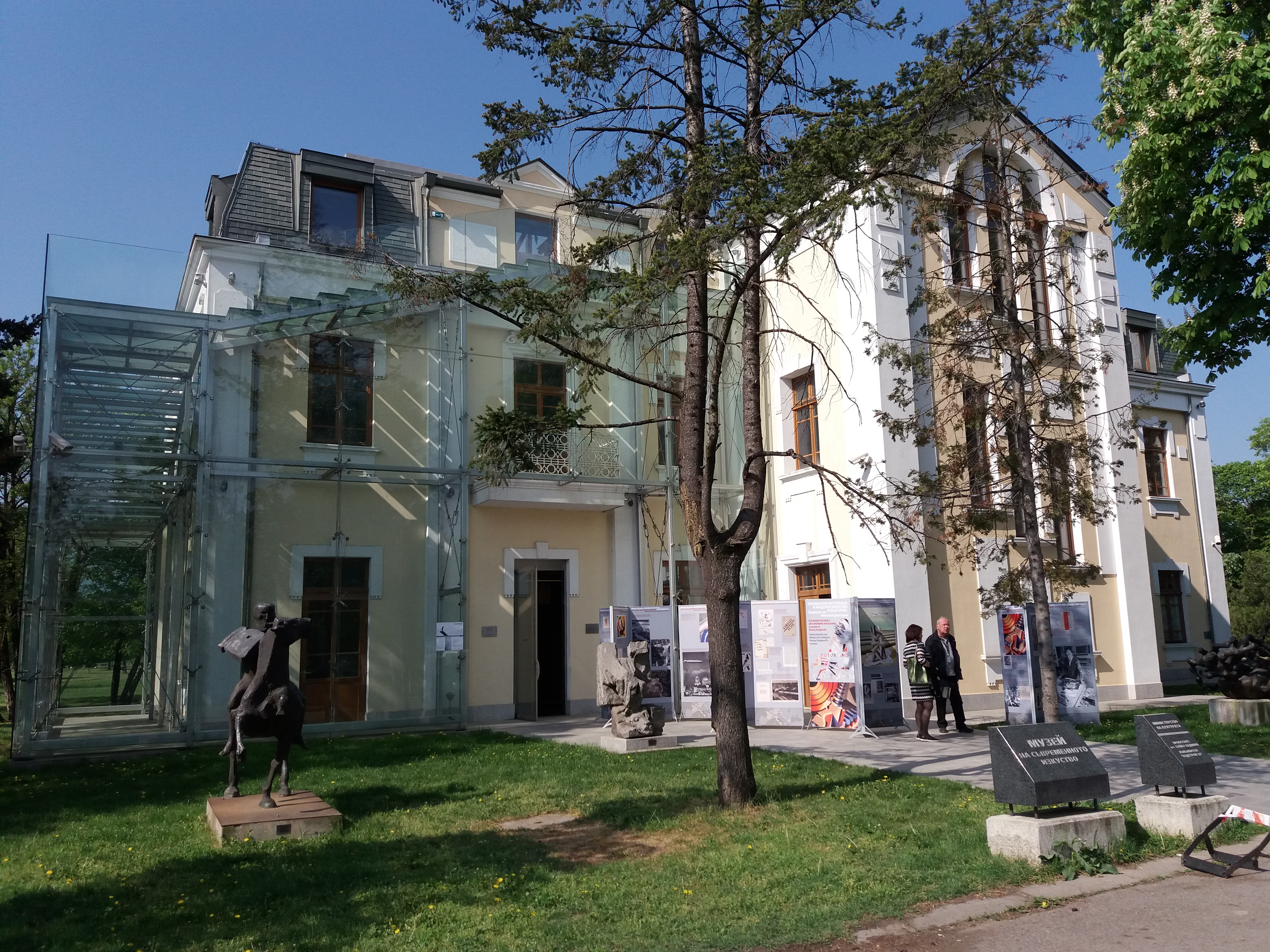
The Museum of Contemporary Art

Bulgaria's largest art museums are located in the central areas of the city. Since 2015, the National Art Gallery, located in the former royal palace, the National Gallery for Foreign Art (NGFA) and the Museum of Contemporary Art – Sofia Arsenal were merged to form the National Gallery. Its largest branch is Kvadrat 500, located on the NFGA premises, where some 2,000 works are on display in twenty eight exhibition halls. The collections encompass diverse cultural items, from Ashanti Empire sculptures and Buddhist art to Dutch Golden Age painting, works by Albrecht Dürer, Jean-Baptiste Greuze and Auguste Rodin. The crypt of the Alexander Nevsky cathedral is another branch of the National Gallery. It holds a collection of Eastern Orthodox icons from the 9th to the 19th century.

The National History Museum, located in Boyana, it has a vast collection of more than 650,000 historical items dating from Prehistory to the modern era, although only 10,000 of them are permanently displayed due to the lack of space. Smaller collections of historical items are displayed in the National Archaeological Museum, a former mosque located between the edifices of the National Bank and the Presidency. Two natural sciences museums—the Natural History Museum and Earth and Man—display minerals, animal species (alive and taxidermic) and rare materials. The Ethnographic Museum and the Museum of Military History hold large collections of Bulgarian folk costumes and armaments, respectively. The Polytechnical Museum has more than 1,000 technological items on display. The SS. Cyril and Methodius National Library, the foremost information repository in the country, holds some 1,800,000 books and more than 7,000,000 documents, manuscripts, maps and other items.

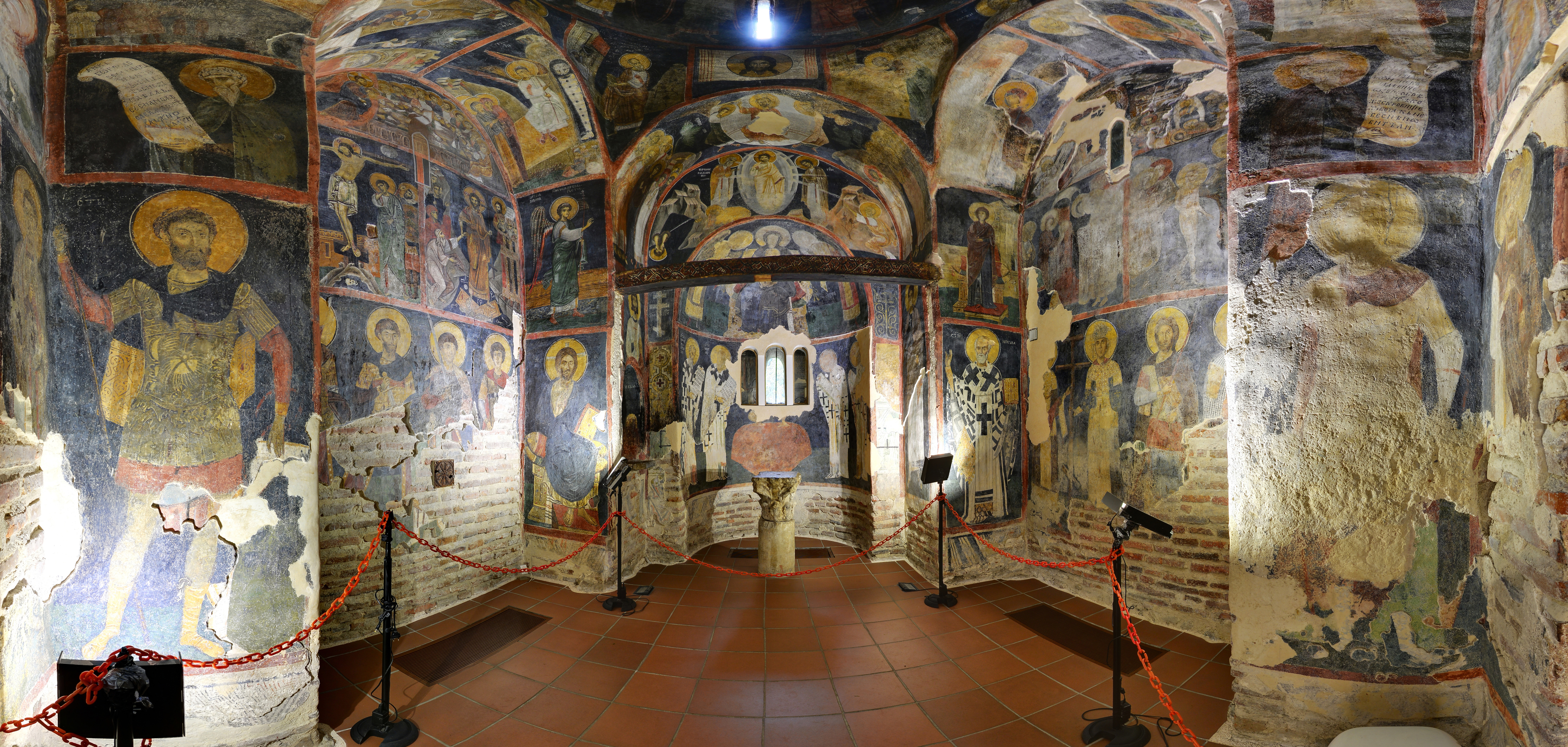
Interior of the medieval Boyana Church

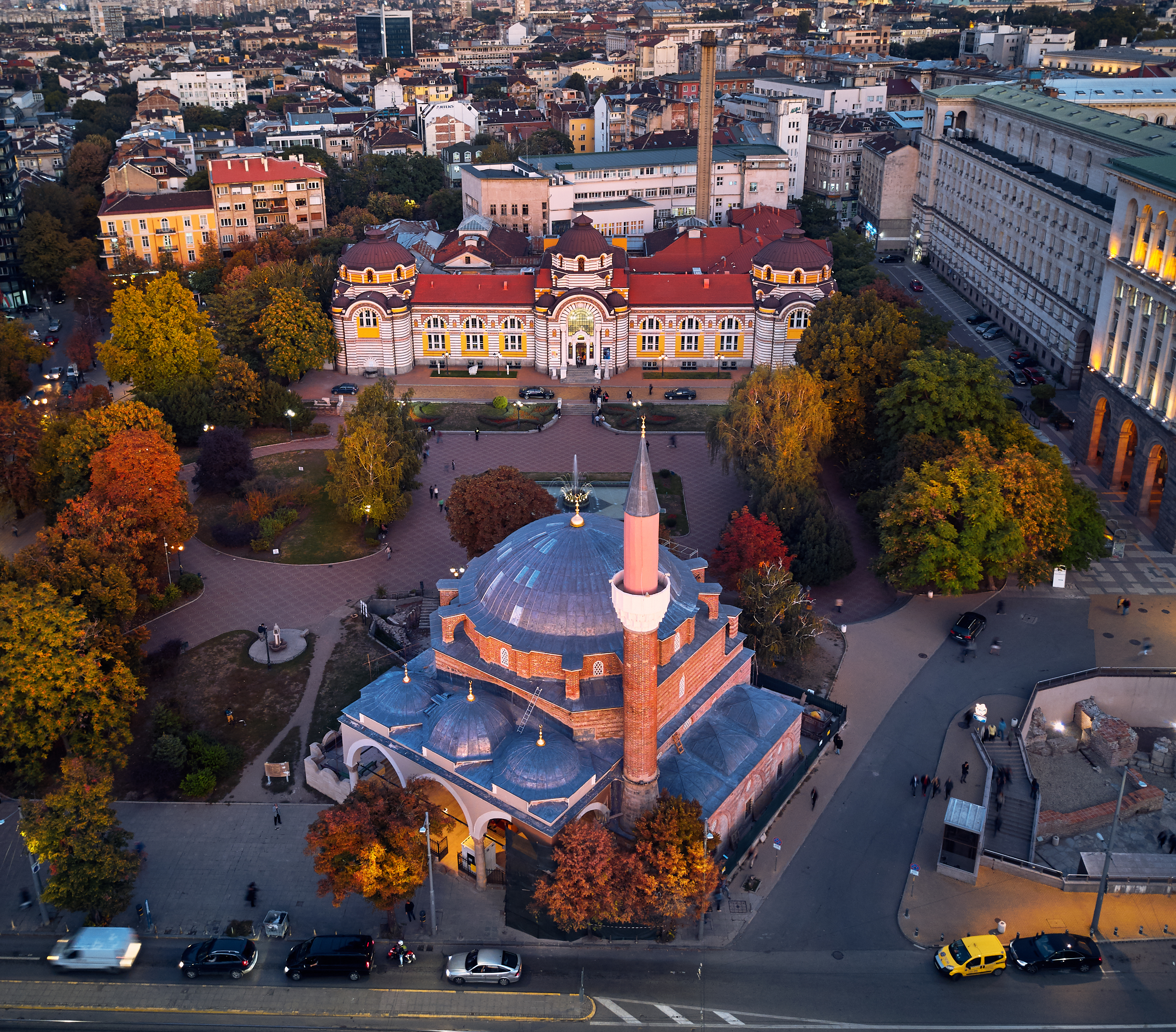
The Banya Bashi Mosque, an example of Ottoman architecture

The city houses many cultural institutes such as the Russian Cultural Institute, the Polish Cultural Institute, the Hungarian Institute, the Czech and the Slovak Cultural Institutes, the Italian Cultural Institute, Confucius Institute, Institut Français, Goethe Institut, British Council and Instituto Cervantes which regularly organise temporary expositions of visual, sound and literary works by artists from their respective countries.

Some of the biggest telecommunications companies, TV and radio stations, newspapers, magazines, and web portals are based in Sofia, including the Bulgarian National Television, bTV and Nova TV. Top-circulation newspapers include 24 Chasa and Trud.

The Boyana Church, a UNESCO World Heritage site, contains realistic frescoes, depicting more than 240 human images and a total 89 scenes, were painted. With their vital, humanistic realism they are a Renaissance phenomenon at its culmination phase in the context of the common-European art.

=== Tourism ===
Sofia is one of the most visited tourist destinations in Bulgaria alongside coastal and mountain resorts. Among its highlights is the Alexander Nevsky Cathedral, one of the symbols of Bulgaria, constructed in the late 19th century. It occupies an area of 3,170 square metres (34,122 square feet) and can hold 10,000 people.

The city centre contains many remains of ancient Serdica that have been excavated and are on public display, including Complex Ancient Serdica, eastern gate, western gate, city walls, thermal baths, 4th c. Rotunda of St. George, amphitheatre of Serdica, the tombs and basilicas under the basilica of St. Sophia.

Vitosha Boulevard, also called Vitoshka, is a pedestrian zone with numerous cafés, restaurants, fashion boutiques, and luxury goods stores. Sofia's geographic location, in the foothills of the weekend retreat Vitosha mountain, further adds to the city's specific atmosphere.

Some tourist attractions in Sofia

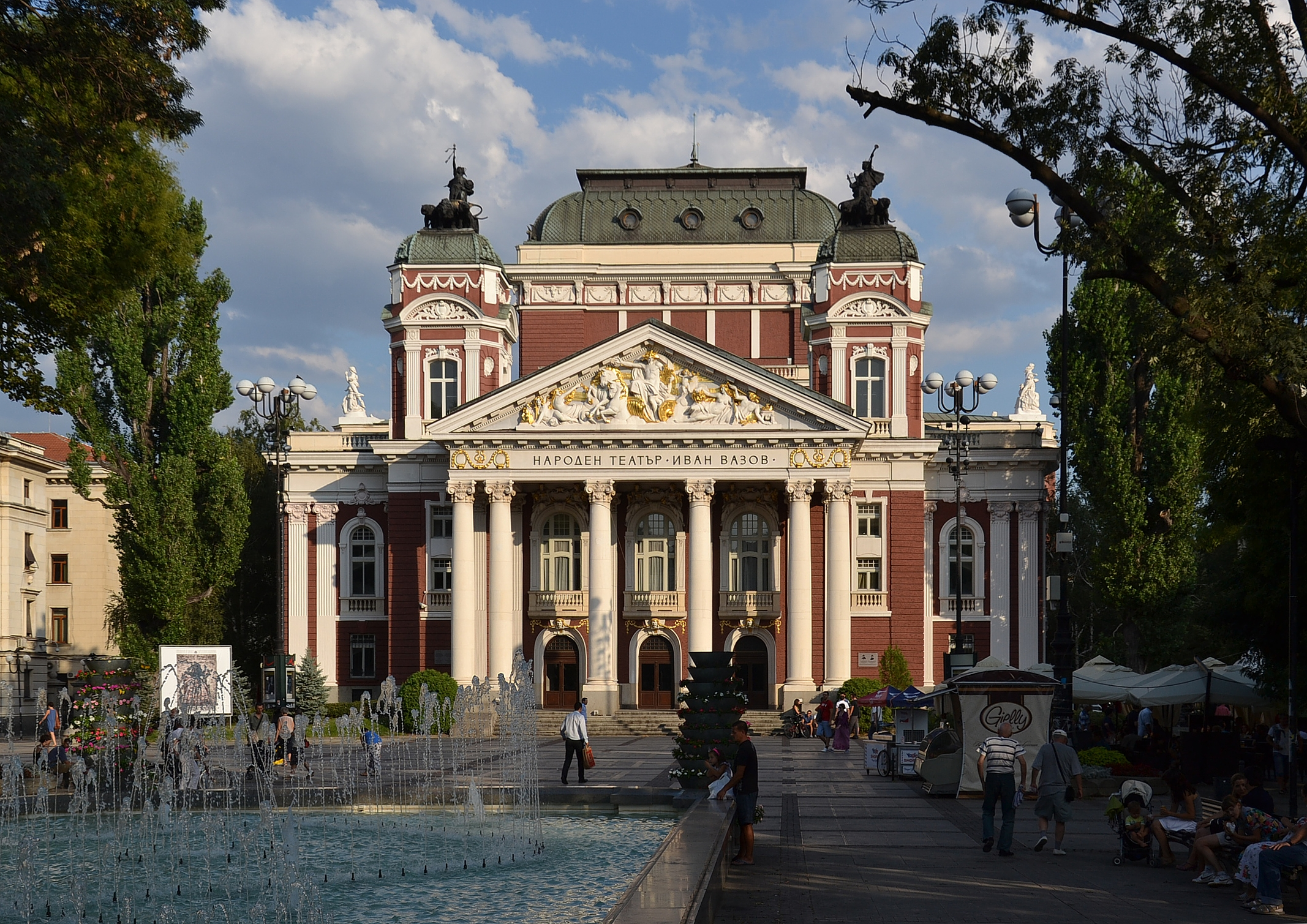
Ivan Vazov National Theatre

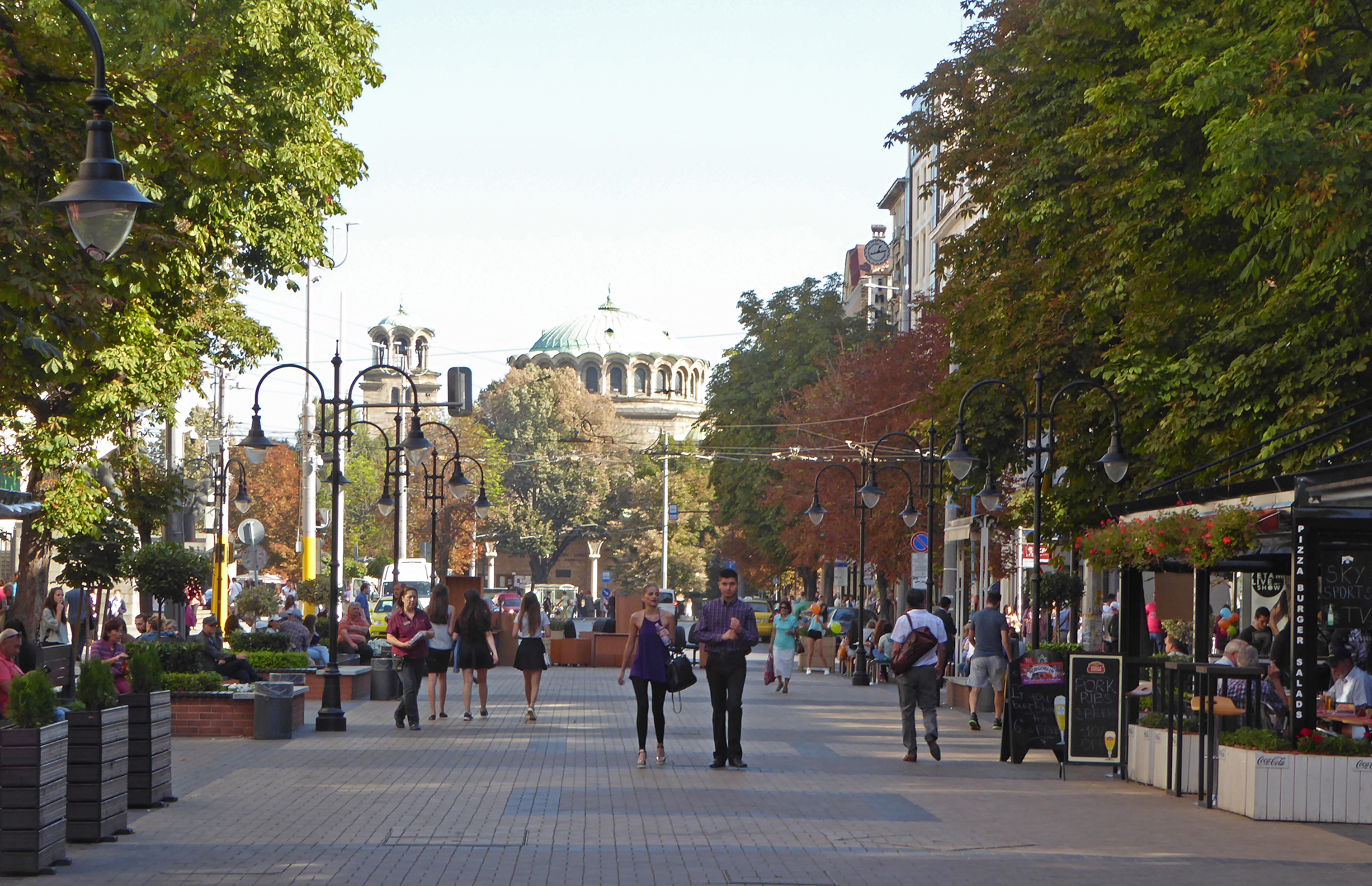
Vitosha Boulevard, the main shopping street in the city

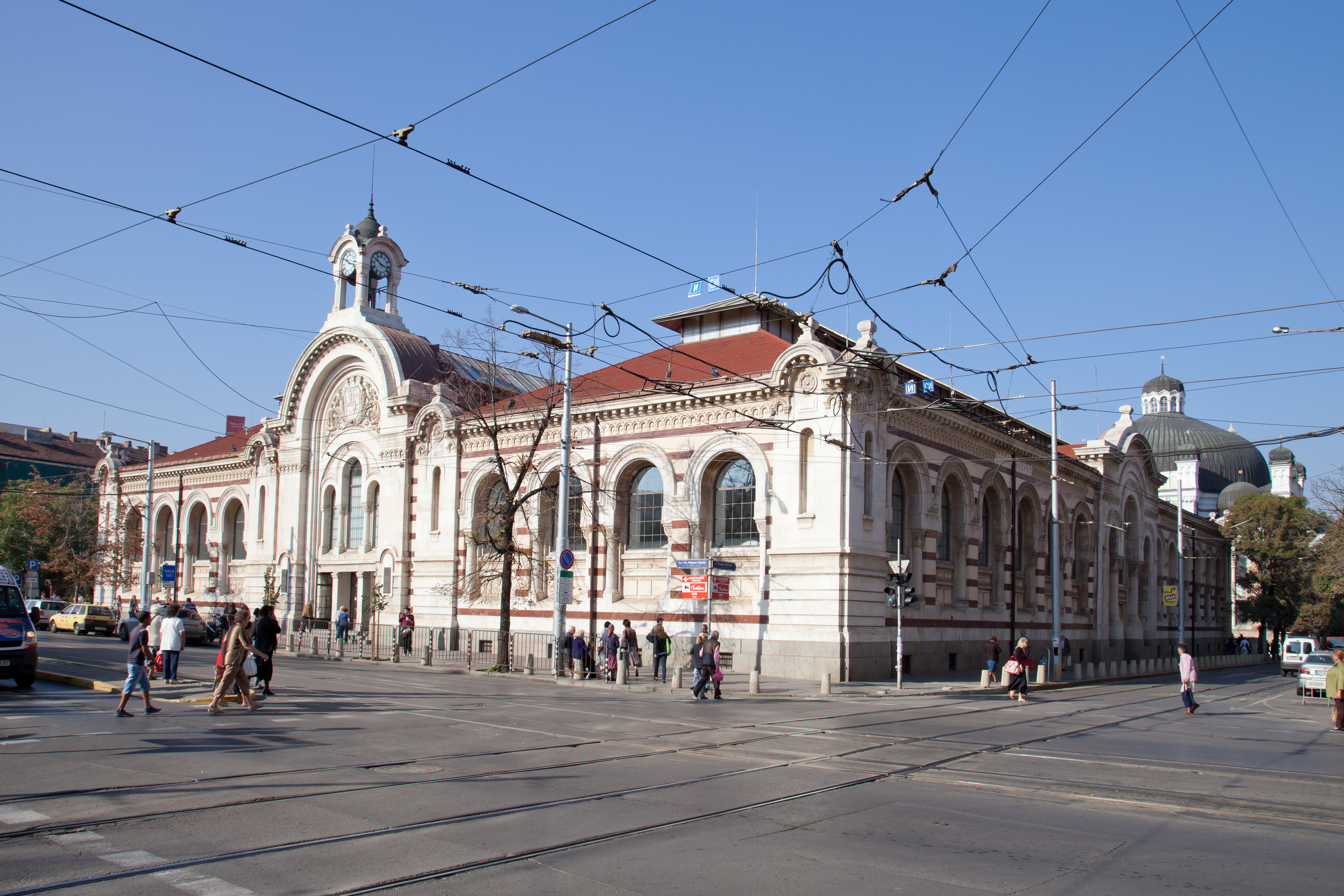
Central Sofia Market Hall

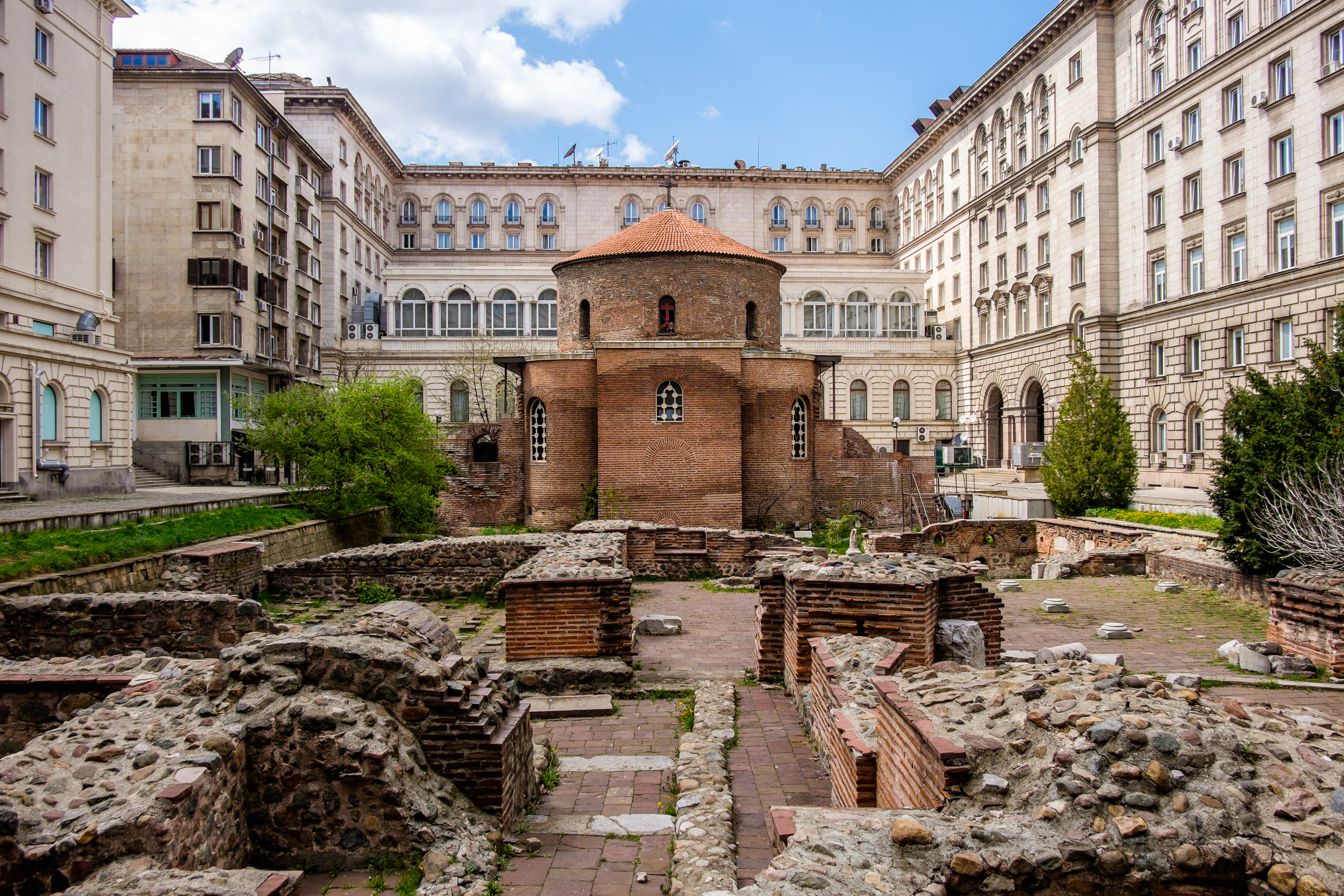
Church of Saint George

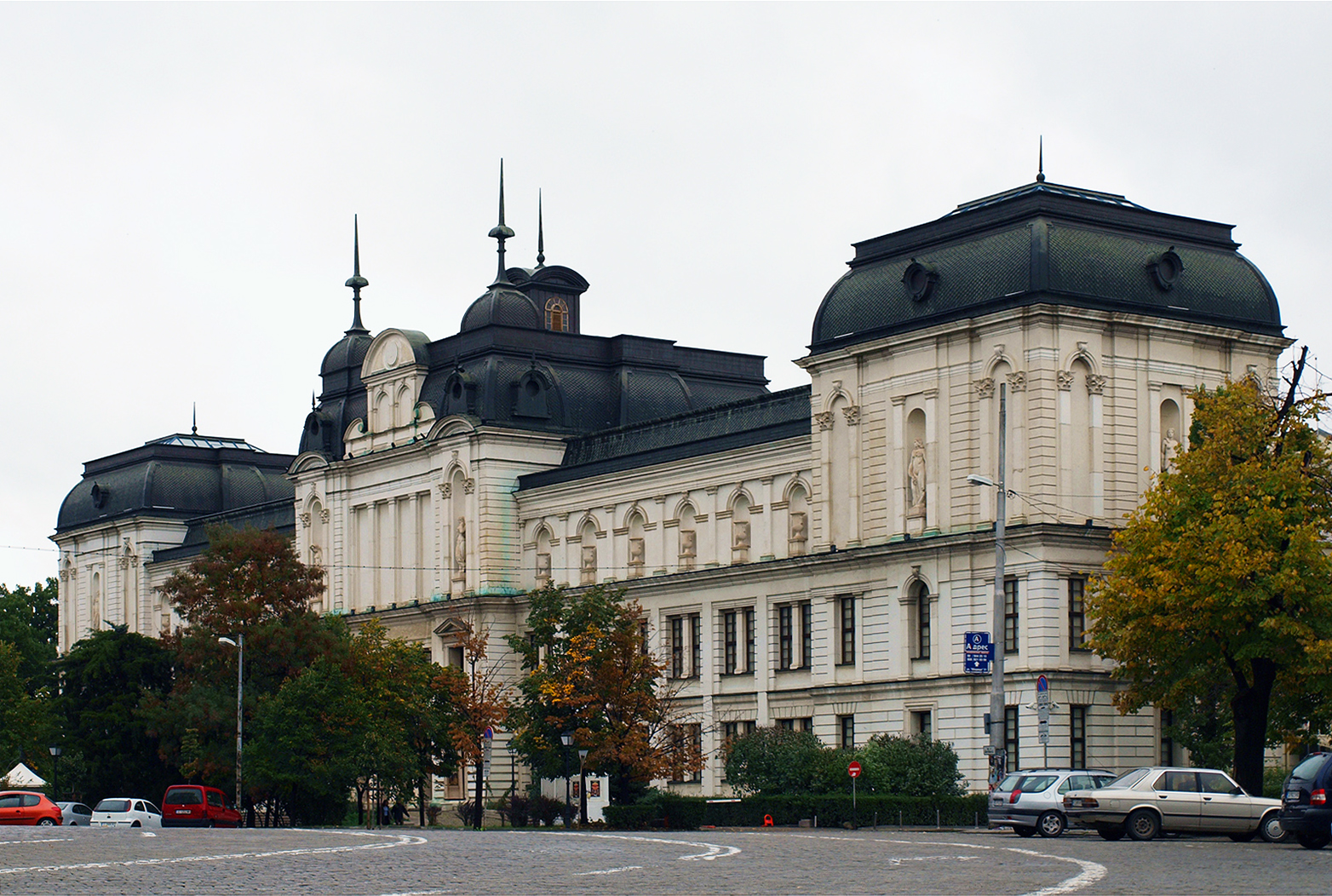
National Gallery for Foreign Art

== Sports ==
The new Balgarska Armia Stadium, home of CSKA Sofia.

A large number of sports clubs are based in the city. During the Communist era, most sports clubs concentrated on all-round sporting development, therefore CSKA, Levski, Lokomotiv, and Slavia are dominant not only in football, but in many other team sports as well. Basketball and volleyball also have strong traditions in Sofia. A notable local basketball team is twice European Champions Cup finalist Lukoil Akademik. The Bulgarian Volleyball Federation is the world's second-oldest, and it was an exhibition tournament organised by the BVF in Sofia that convinced the International Olympic Committee to include volleyball as an olympic sport in 1957. Tennis is increasingly popular in the city. There are some ten tennis court complexes within the city including the one founded by former WTA top-five athlete Magdalena Maleeva.

Sofia applied to host the Winter Olympic Games in 1992 and in 1994, coming second and third respectively. The city was also an applicant for the 2014 Winter Olympics, but was not selected as candidate. In addition, Sofia hosted EuroBasket 1957 and the 1961 and 1977 Summer Universiades, as well as the 1983 and 1989 winter editions. In 2012, it hosted the FIVB World League finals.

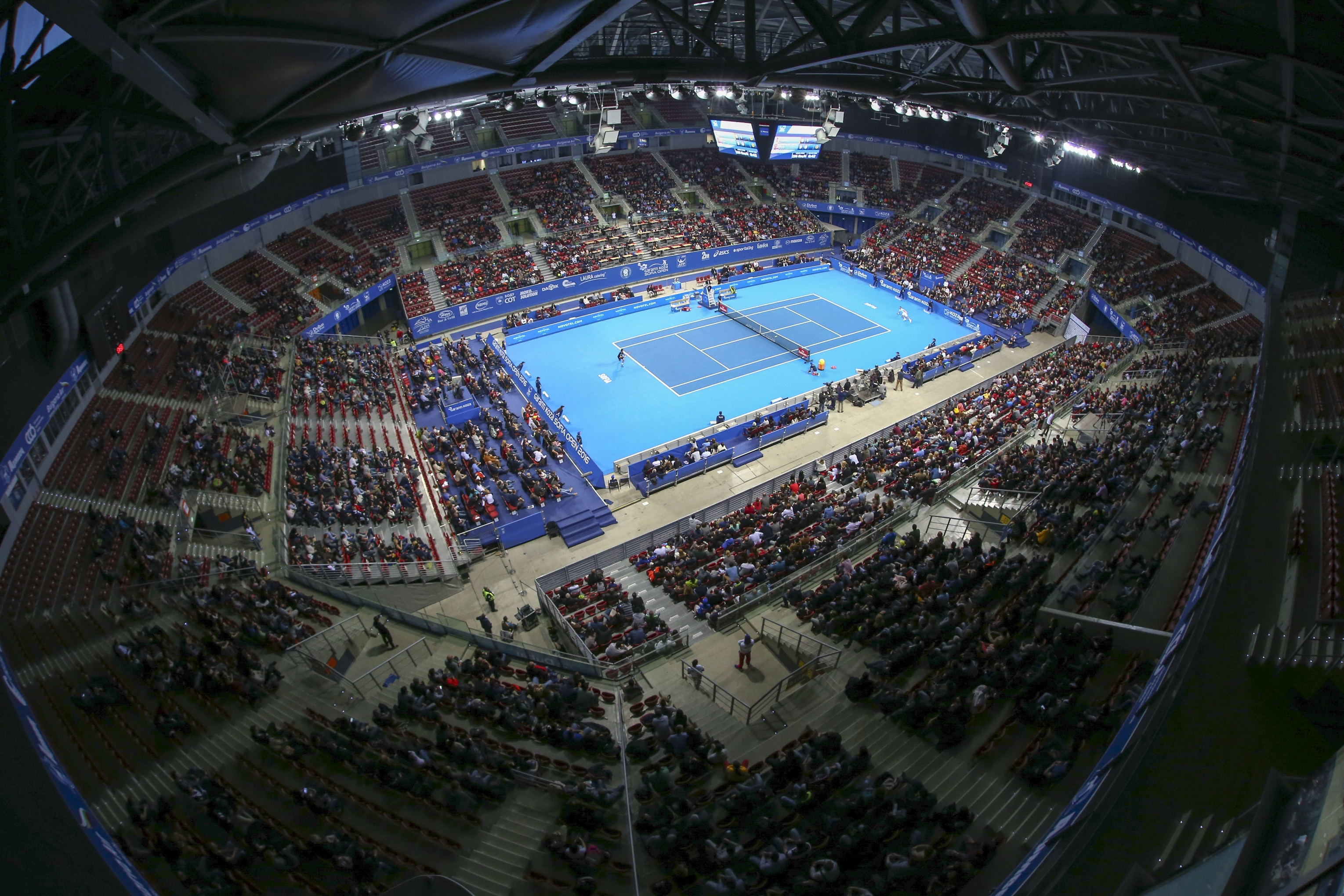
Arena Sofia during the ATP Sofia Open

The city is home to a number of large sports venues, including the 43,000-seat Vasil Levski National Stadium which hosts international football matches, as well as Balgarska Armia Stadium, Georgi Asparuhov Stadium and Lokomotiv Stadium, the main venues for outdoor musical concerts. Arena Sofia holds many indoor events and has a capacity of up to 19,000 people depending on its use. The venue was inaugurated on 30 July 2011, and the first event it hosted was a friendly volleyball match between Bulgaria and Serbia. There are two ice skating complexes — the Winter Sports Palace with a capacity of 4,600 and the Slavia Winter Stadium with a capacity of 2,000, both containing two rinks each. A velodrome with 5,000 seats in the city's central park is undergoing renovation. There are also various other sports complexes in the city which belong to institutions other than football clubs, such as those of the National Sports Academy, the Bulgarian Academy of Sciences, or those of different universities. There are more than fifteen swimming complexes in the city, most of them outdoor. Nearly all of these were constructed as competition venues and therefore have seating facilities for several hundred people.

There are two golf courses just to the east of Sofia — in Elin Pelin (St Sofia club) and in Ihtiman (Air Sofia club), and a horseriding club (St George club). Sofia was designated as European Capital of Sport in 2018. The decision was announced in November 2014 by the Evaluation Committee of ACES Europe, on the grounds that "the city is a good example of sport for all, as means to improve healthy lifestyle, integration and education, which are the basis of the initiative".

== Demographics ==
Sofia population pyramid in 2021

Population over the years (in thousands):

Historical population
Year	Pop.	±%
1887	30,501	—
1910	102,812	+237.1%
1934	287,095	+179.2%
1946	436,623	+52.1%
1956	644,727	+47.7%
1965	801,111	+24.3%
1975	967,214	+20.7%
1985	1,114,759	+15.3%
1992	1,114,925	+0.0%
2001	1,091,772	−2.1%
2011	1,202,761	+10.2%
2021	1,221,785	+1.6%
2022	1,221,172	−0.1%
Source: Censuses"National statistical institute". 31 October 2024.

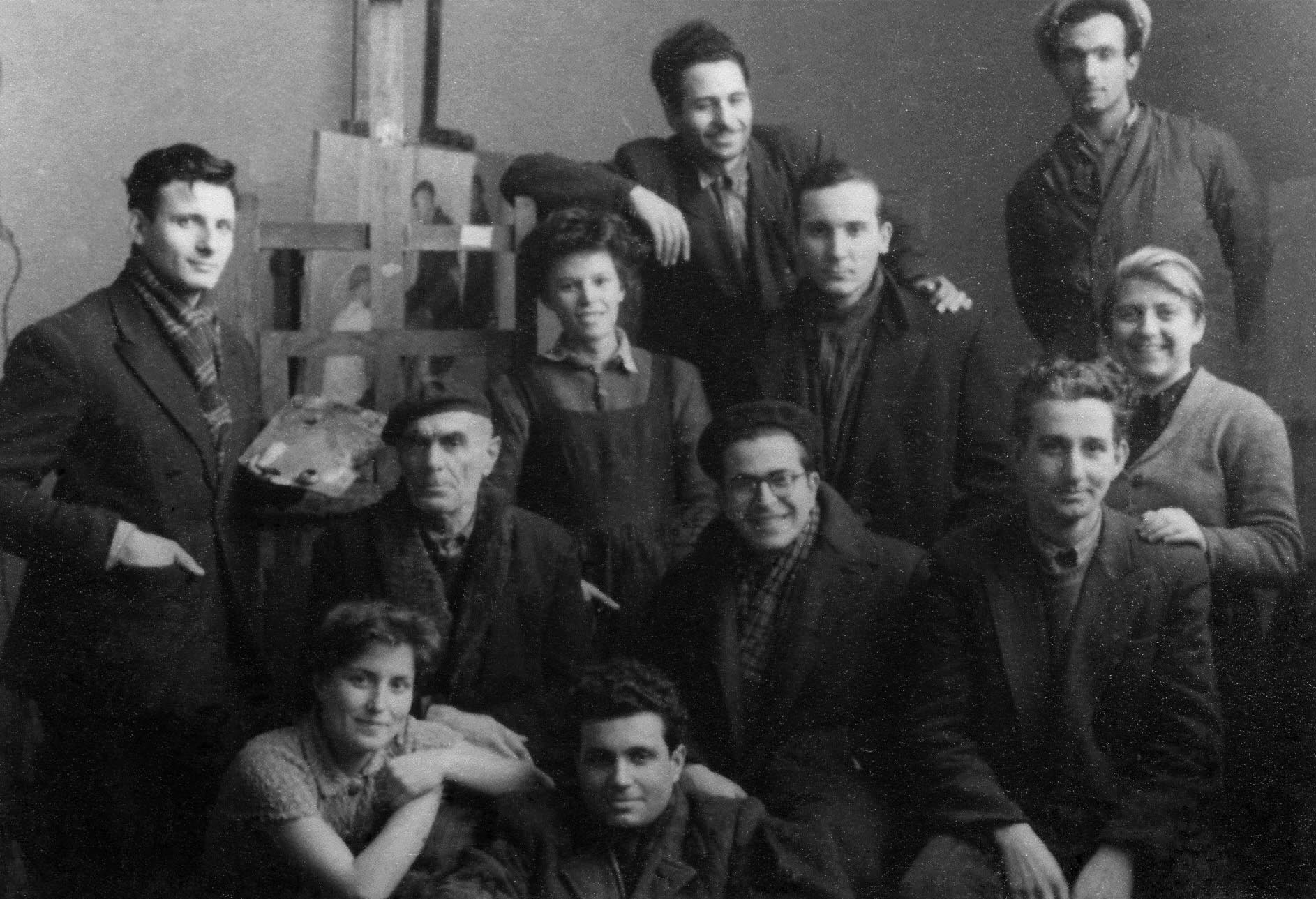
Students of the National Academy of Art (circa 1952–53). People aged 20–25 years have been the most numerous group in the city since the process of Bulgarian urbanisation.

According to 2018 data, the city has a population of 1,400,384 and the whole Sofia Capital Municipality of 1,500,120. The first census carried out in February 1878 by the Russian Army recorded a population of 11,694 inhabitants including 6,560 Bulgarians, 3,538 Jews, 839 Turks, and 737 Romani.

The ratio of women per 1,000 men was 1,102. The birth rate per 1000 people was 12.3 per mile and steadily increasing in the last 5 years, the death rate reaching 12.1 per mile and decreasing. The natural growth rate during 2009 was 0.2 per mile, the first positive growth rate in nearly 20 years. The considerable immigration to the capital from poorer regions of the country, as well as urbanisation, are among the other reasons for the increase in Sofia's population. The infant mortality rate was 5.6 per 1,000, down from 18.9 in 1980. According to the 2011 census, people aged 20–24 years are the most numerous group, numbering 133,170 individuals and accounting for 11% of the total 1,202,761 people. The median age is 38 though. According to the census, 1,056,738 citizens (87.9%) are recorded as ethnic Bulgarians, 17,550 (1.5%) as Romani, 6,149 (0.5%) as Turks, 9,569 (0.8%) belonged to other ethnic groups, 6,993 (0.6%) do not self-identify and 105,762 (8.8%) remained with undeclared affiliation.

According to the 2011 census, throughout the whole municipality some 892,511 people (69.1%) are recorded as Eastern Orthodox Christians, 10,256 (0.8%) as Protestant, 6,767 (0.5%) as Muslim, 5,572 (0.4%) as Roman Catholic, 4,010 (0.3%) belonged to other faith and 372,475 (28.8%) declared themselves irreligious or did not mention any faith. The data says that roughly a third of the total population have already earned a university degree. Of the population aged 15–64 – 265,248 people within the municipality (28.5%) are not economically active, the unemployed being another group of 55,553 people (6%), a large share of whom have completed higher education. The largest group are occupied in trading, followed by those in the manufacturing industry. Within the municipality, three-quarters, or 965,328 people are recorded as having access to television at home and 836,435 (64.8%) as having internet. Out of 464,865 homes – 432,847 have connection to the communal sanitary sewer, while 2,732 do not have any. Of these 864 do not have any water supply and 688 have other than communal. Over 99.6% of males and females aged over 9 are recorded as literate. The largest group of the population aged over 20 are recorded to live within marriage (46.3%), another 43.8% are recorded as single and another 9.9% as having other type of coexistence/partnership, whereas not married in total are a majority and among people aged up to 40 and over 70. The people with juridical status divorced or widowed are either part of the factual singles or those having another type of partnership, each of the two constitutes by around 10% of the population aged over 20. Only over 1% of the juridically married do not de facto live within marriage. The families that consist of two people are 46.8%, another 34.2% of the families are made up by three people, whereas most of the households (36.5%) consist of only one person.

Sofia was declared the national capital in 1879. One year later, in 1880, it was the fifth-largest city in the country after Plovdiv, Varna, Ruse and Shumen. Plovdiv remained the most populous Bulgarian town until 1892 when Sofia took the lead. The city is the hot spot of internal migration, the capital population is increasing and is around 17% of the national, thus a small number of people with local roots remain today, they dominate the surrounding rural suburbs and are called Shopi. Shopi speak the Western Bulgarian dialects.

Religious buildings in Sofia

Alexander Nevsky Cathedral

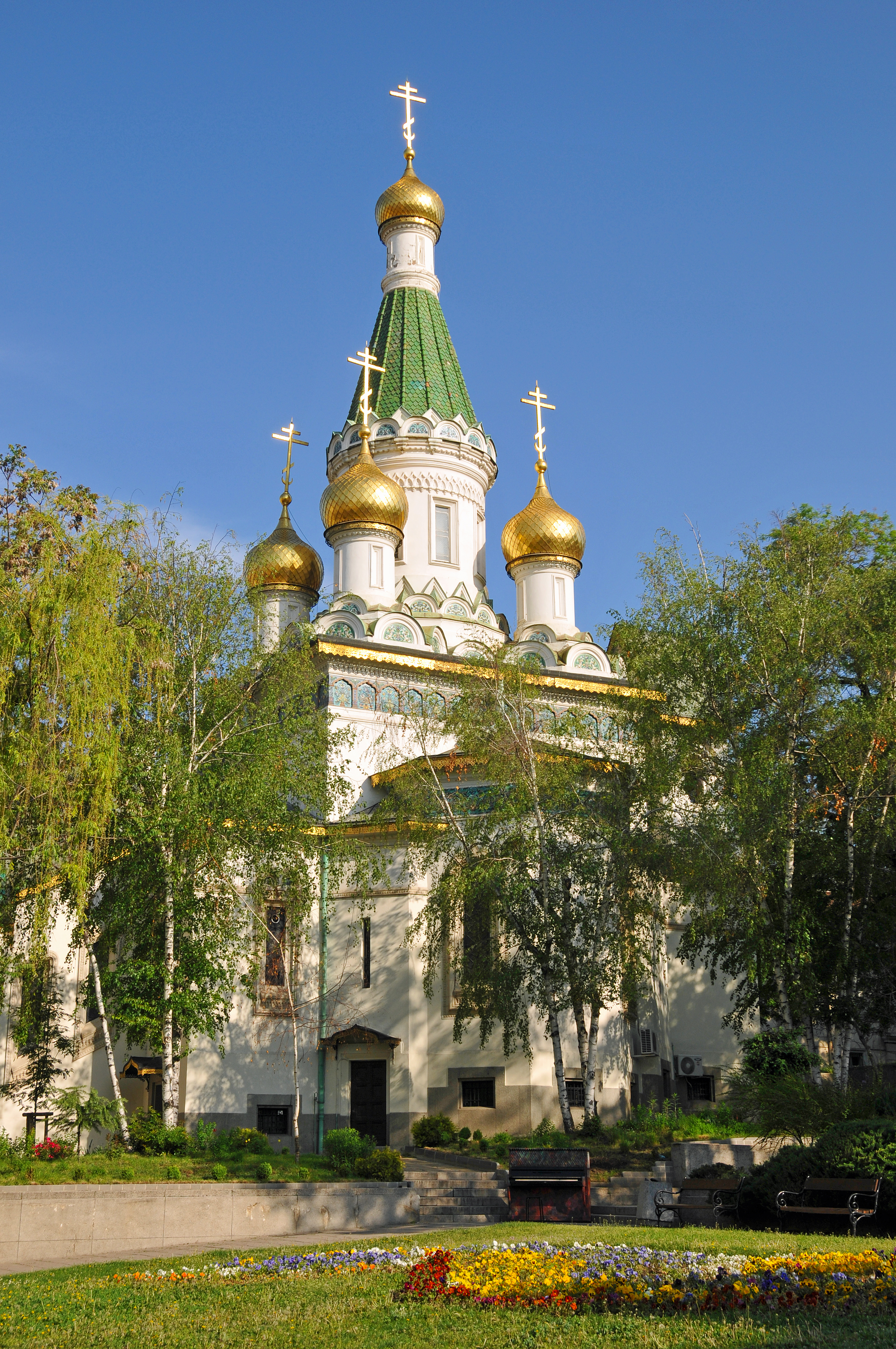
Russian Church

Cathedral of St Joseph

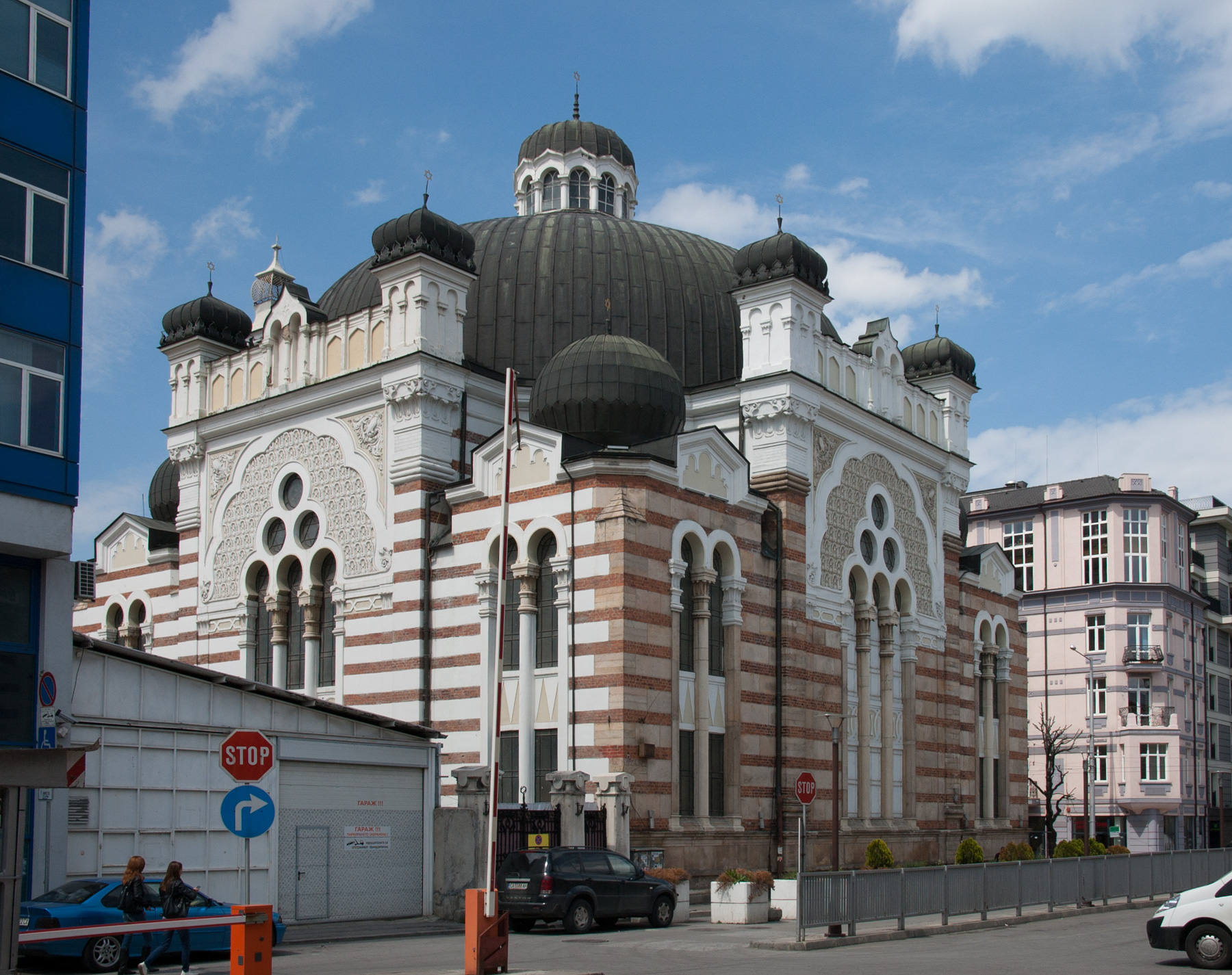
Sofia Synagogue

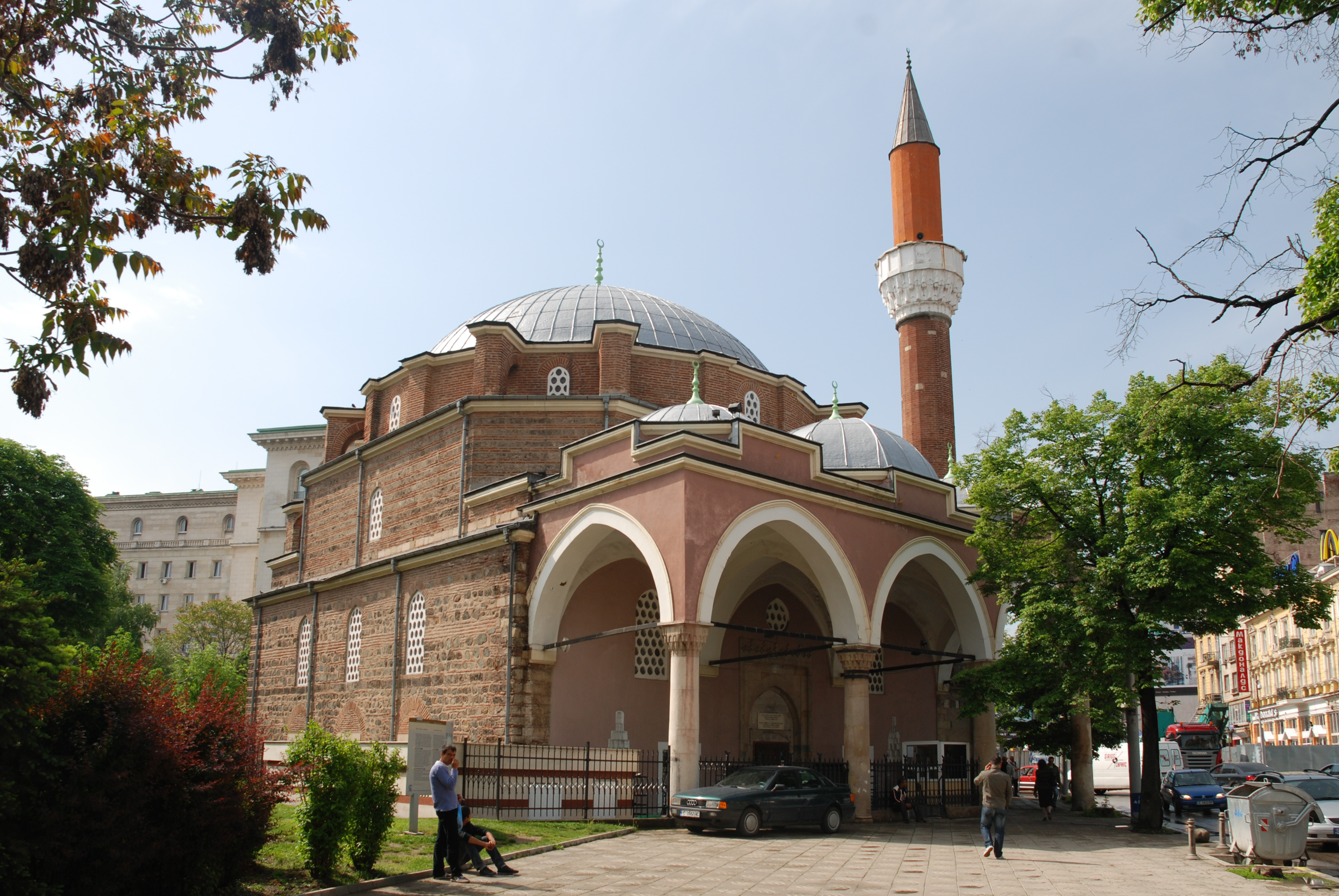
Banya Bashi Mosque

== Economy ==
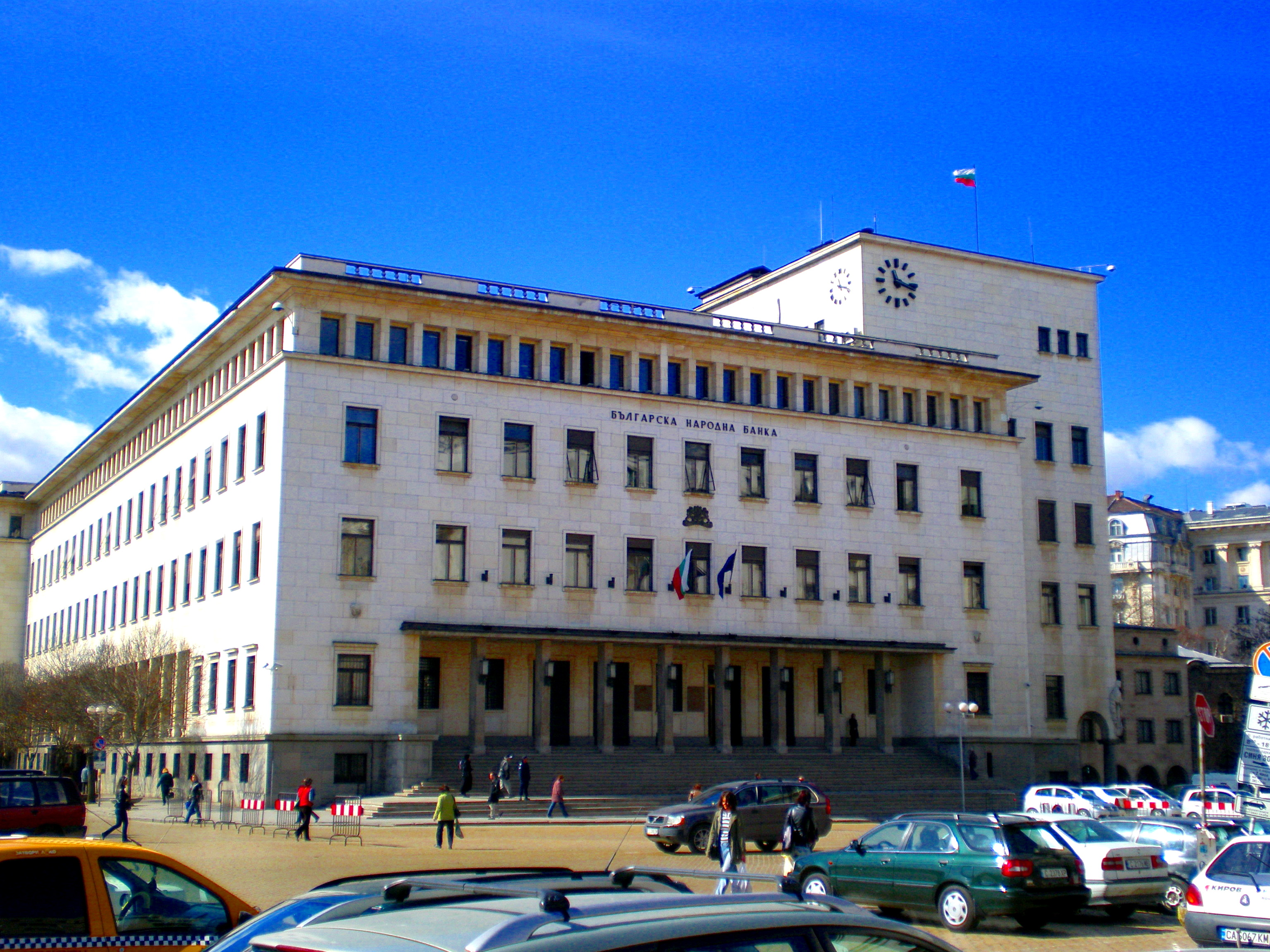
Bulgarian National Bank headquarters

Sofia is ranked as a Beta global city by the Globalization and World Cities Research Network. It is the economic hub of Bulgaria and home to most major Bulgarian and international companies operating in the country, as well as the Bulgarian National Bank and the Bulgarian Stock Exchange. The city is ranked 62nd among financial centres worldwide. In 2015, Sofia was ranked 30th out of 300 global cities in terms of combined growth in employment and real gross domestic product (GDP) per capita, the highest one amongst cities in Southeast Europe. The real GDP (PPP) per capita growth at the time was 2.5% and the employment went up by 3.4% to 962,400. In 2015, Forbes listed Sofia as one of the top 10 places in the world to launch a startup business, because of the low corporate tax (10%), the fast internet connection speeds available – one of the fastest in the world, and the presence of several investment funds, including Eleven Startup Accelerator, LAUNCHub and Neveq.

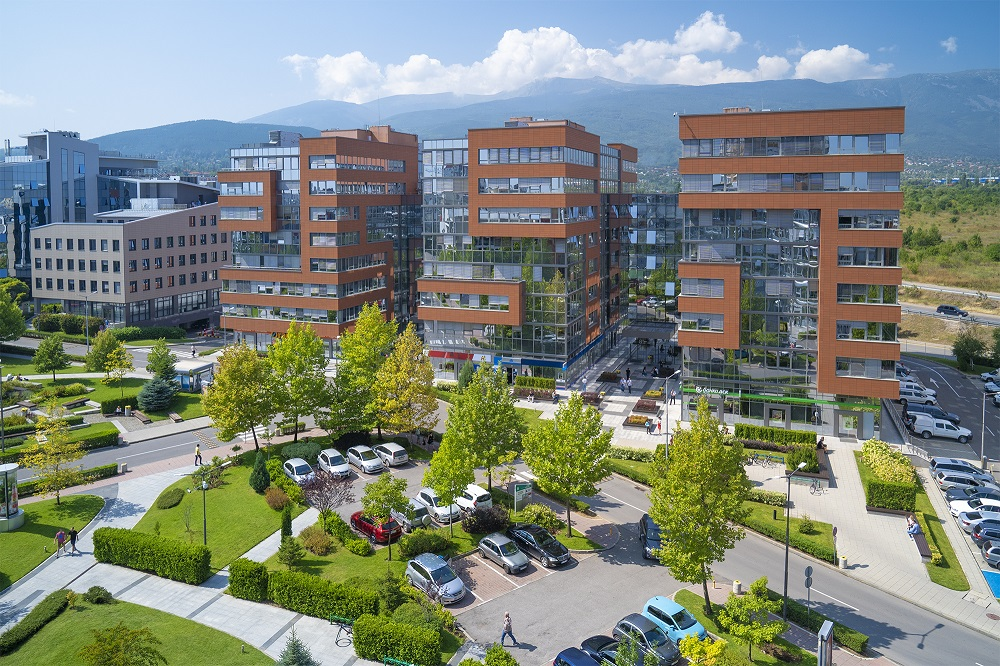
Business Park Sofia

The city's GDP (PPS) per capita stood at €29,600 ($33,760) in 2015, one of the highest in Southeast Europe and well above other cities in the country. The total nominal GDP in 2018 was 38.5 billion leva ($22.4 billion), or 33,437 leva ($19,454) per capita, and average monthly wages in March 2020 were $1,071, the highest nationally. Services dominate the economy, accounting for 88.6% of the gross value added, followed by industry 11.3% and agriculture 0.1%.

Historically, after World War II and the era of industrialisation under socialism, the city and its surrounding areas expanded rapidly and became the most heavily industrialised region of the country, with numerous factories producing steel, pig iron, machinery, industrial equipment, electronics, trams, chemicals, textiles, and food. The influx of workers from other parts of the country became so intense that a restriction policy was imposed, and residing in the capital was only possible after obtaining Sofianite citizenship. However, after the political changes in 1989, this kind of citizenship was removed.

The most dynamic sectors include Information technology (IT) and manufacturing. Sofia is a regional IT hub, ranking second among the Top 10 fastest growing tech centres in Europe in terms of annual growth of active members. The sector employs about 50,000 professionals, 30% of them involved in programming, and contributes for 14% of the city's exports. The IT sector is highly diverse and includes both multinational corporations, local companies and startups. Multinationals with major research, development, innovation and engineering centres in Sofia include the second largest global IT centre of Coca-Cola, Ubisoft, Hewlett-Packard, VMware, Robert Bosch GmbH, Financial Times, Experian, etc. Several office and tech clusters have been established across the city, including Business Park Sofia, Sofia Tech Park, Capital Fort and others.

Manufacturing has registered a strong recovery since 2012, increasing the exports three-fold and the employment by 52% accounting for over 70,000 jobs. Supported by the city's R&D expertise, Sofia is shifting to high value-added manufacturing including electrical equipment, precision mechanics, pharmaceuticals. There are 16 industrial and logistics parks in Sofia, some sprawling to towns in neighbouring Sofia Province, such as Bozhurishte, Kostinbrod and Elin Pelin. Manufacturing companies include Woodward, Inc., producing airframe and industrial turbomachinery systems, Festo, producing microsensors, Visteon, development and engineering of instrument clusters, LCD screens and domain controllers, Melexis, producing micro-electronic semiconductor solutions in the automotive sector, Sopharma, producing pharmaceuticals, the largest Lufthansa Technik maintenance facilities outside Germany, etc.

== Transport and infrastructure ==
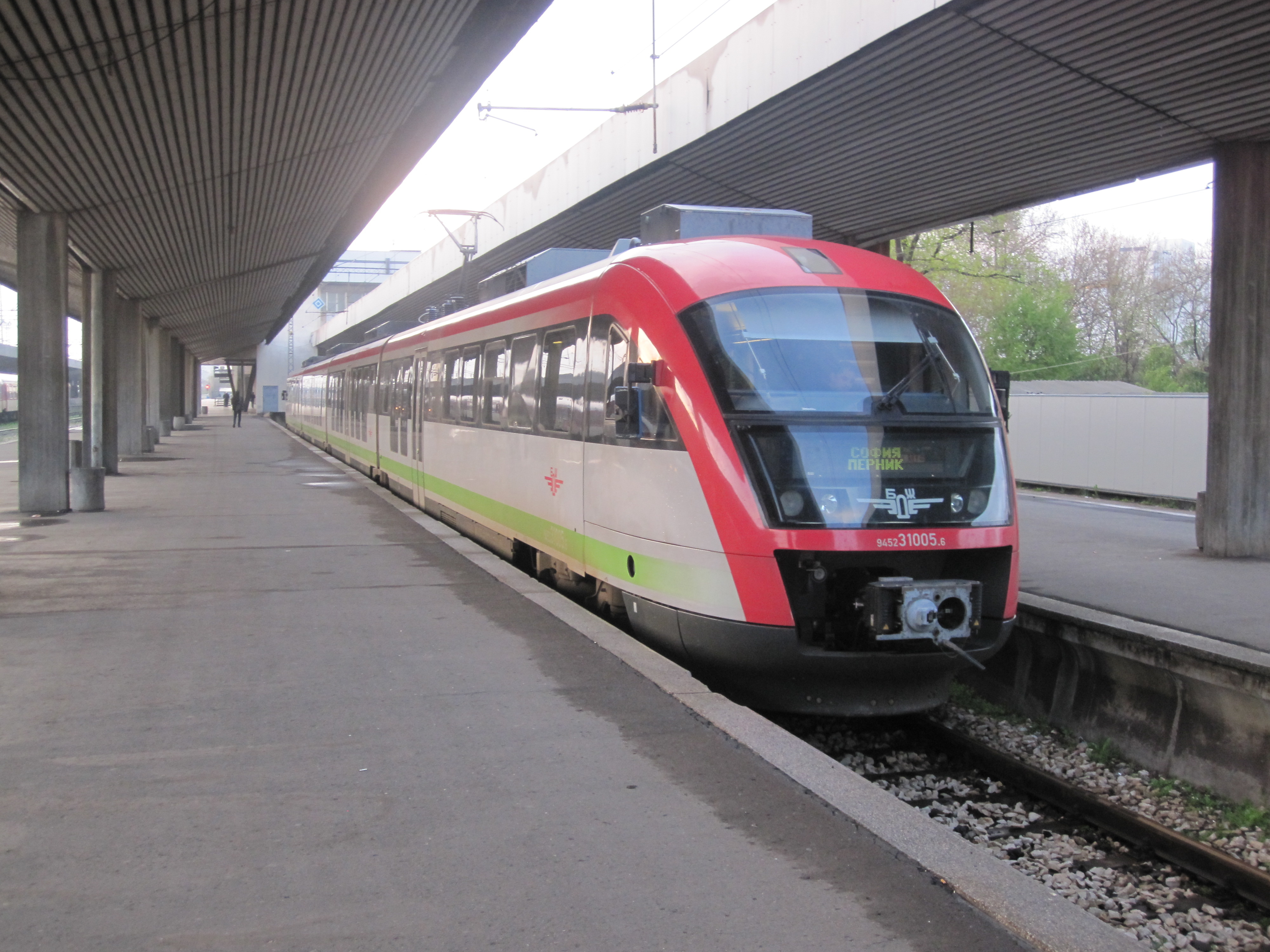
A Siemens Desiro train of the Bulgarian State Railways at the Central Railway Station

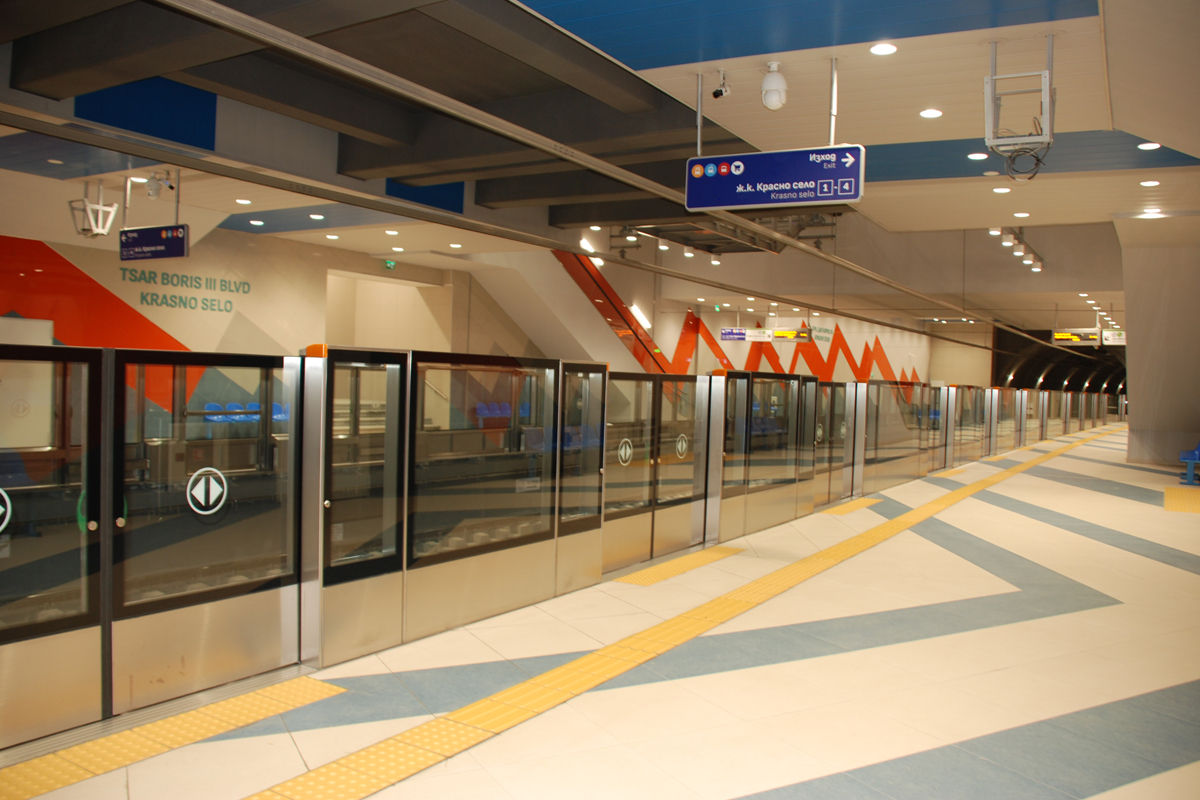
Tsar Boris III Metro Station

With its developing infrastructure and strategic location, Sofia is a major hub for international railway and automobile transport. Three of the ten Pan-European Transport Corridors cross the city: IV, VIII, and X. All major types of transport (except water) are represented in the city.

The Central Railway Station is the primary hub for domestic and international rail transport, carried out by Bulgarian State Railways (BDZ), the national rail company headquartered in the city. It is one of the main stations along BDZ Line 1, and a hub of Lines 2, 5, and 13. Line 1 provides a connection to Plovdiv, the second-largest city in Bulgaria, while Line 2 is the longest national railway and connects Sofia and Varna, the largest coastal city. Lines 5 and 13 are shorter and provide connections to Kulata and Bankya, respectively. Overall, Sofia has 186 km (116 miles) of railway lines.

Vasil Levski Sofia Airport handled 7,922,702 passengers in 2024.

Public transport is well-developed with bus (2,380 km (1,479 mi)), tram (308 km (191 mi)), and trolleybus (193 km (120 mi)) lines running in all areas of the city. The Sofia Metro became operational in January 1998 with only 5 stations, and currently has four lines and 50 stations. As of 2026, the system has 55 km (34 mi) of track. Six new stations were opened in 2009, two more in April 2012, and eleven more in August 2012. In 2015 seven new stations were opened and the underground extended to Vasil Levski Sofia Airport on its Northern branch and to Business Park Sofia on its Southern branch. In July 2016 the Vitosha Metro Station was opened on the M2 main line. A third line was opened in August 2020 and re-organisation of the previous lines lead to a 4th line being created. This line will complete the proposed underground system of three lines with about 65 km (40 mi) of lines. The master plan for the Sofia Metro includes three lines with a total of 63 stations. Until the late 2010s route taxis (marshrutka) provided an efficient and popular means of transport by being faster than public transport, but cheaper than taxis. Their use declined with the expansion of the metro and they were gradually phased out. There are around 13,000 taxi cabs operating in the city. Additionally, all-electric vehicles are available through carsharing company Spark.

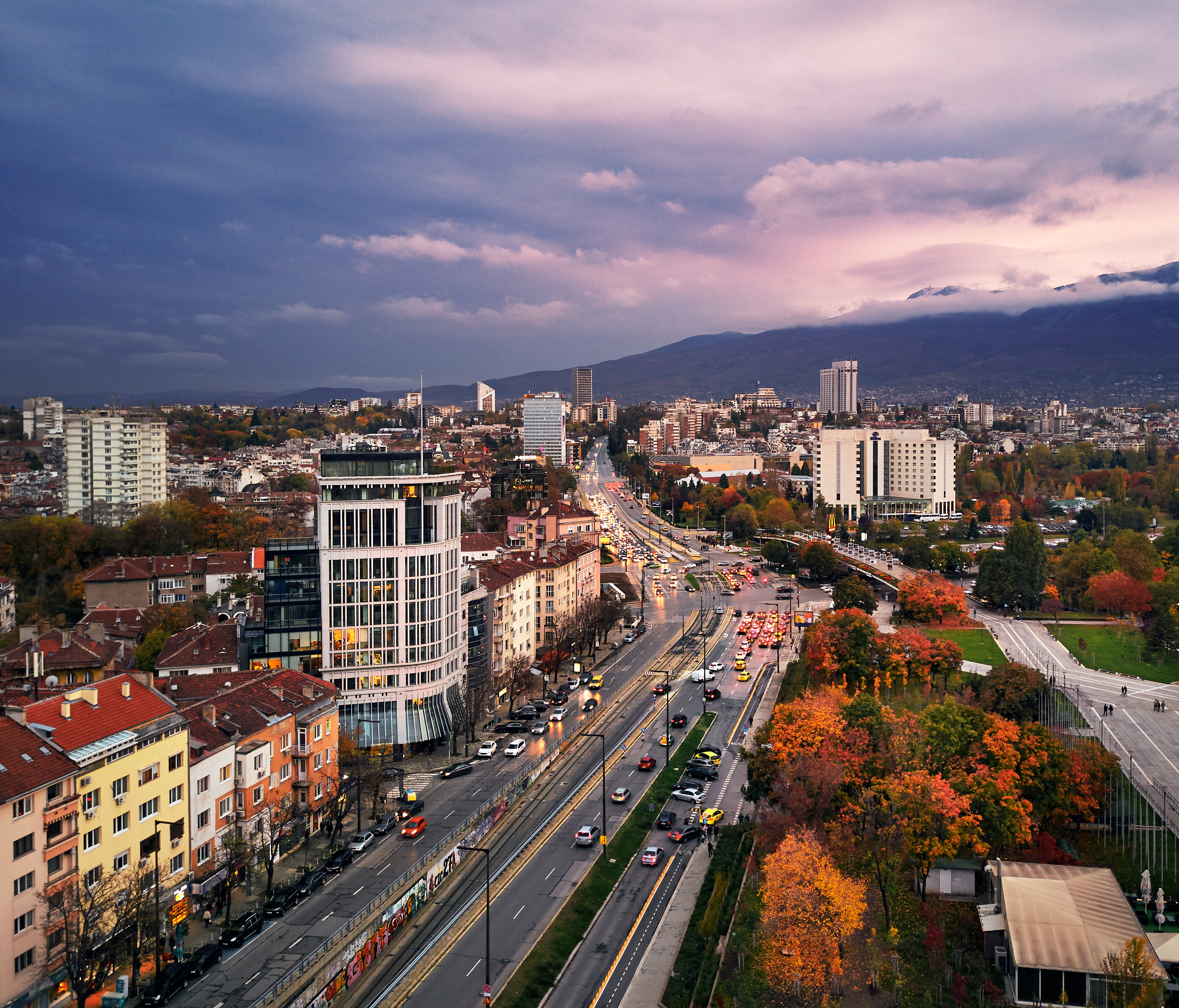
Cherni Vrah Boulevard

Private automobile ownership has grown rapidly in the 1990s; more than 1,000,000 cars were registered in Sofia after 2002. The city has the 4th-highest number of automobiles per capita in the European Union at 546.4 vehicles per 1,000 people. The municipality was known for minor and cosmetic repairs and many streets are in a poor condition. This is noticeably changing in the past years. There are different boulevards and streets in the city with a higher amount of traffic than others. These include Tsarigradsko shose, Cherni Vrah, Bulgaria, Slivnitsa, and Todor Aleksandrov boulevards, as well as the city's ring road. Consequently, traffic and air pollution problems have become more severe and receive regular criticism in local media. The extension of the underground system is hoped to alleviate the city's immense traffic problems.

Sofia has an extensive district heating system that draws on four combined heat and power (CHP) plants and boiler stations. Virtually the entire city (900,000 households and 5,900 companies) is centrally heated, using residual heat from electricity generation (3,000 MW) and gas- and oil-fired heating furnaces; total heat capacity is 4,640 MW. The heat distribution piping network is 900 km (559 mi) long and comprises 14,000 substations and 10,000 heated buildings.

== Education and science ==
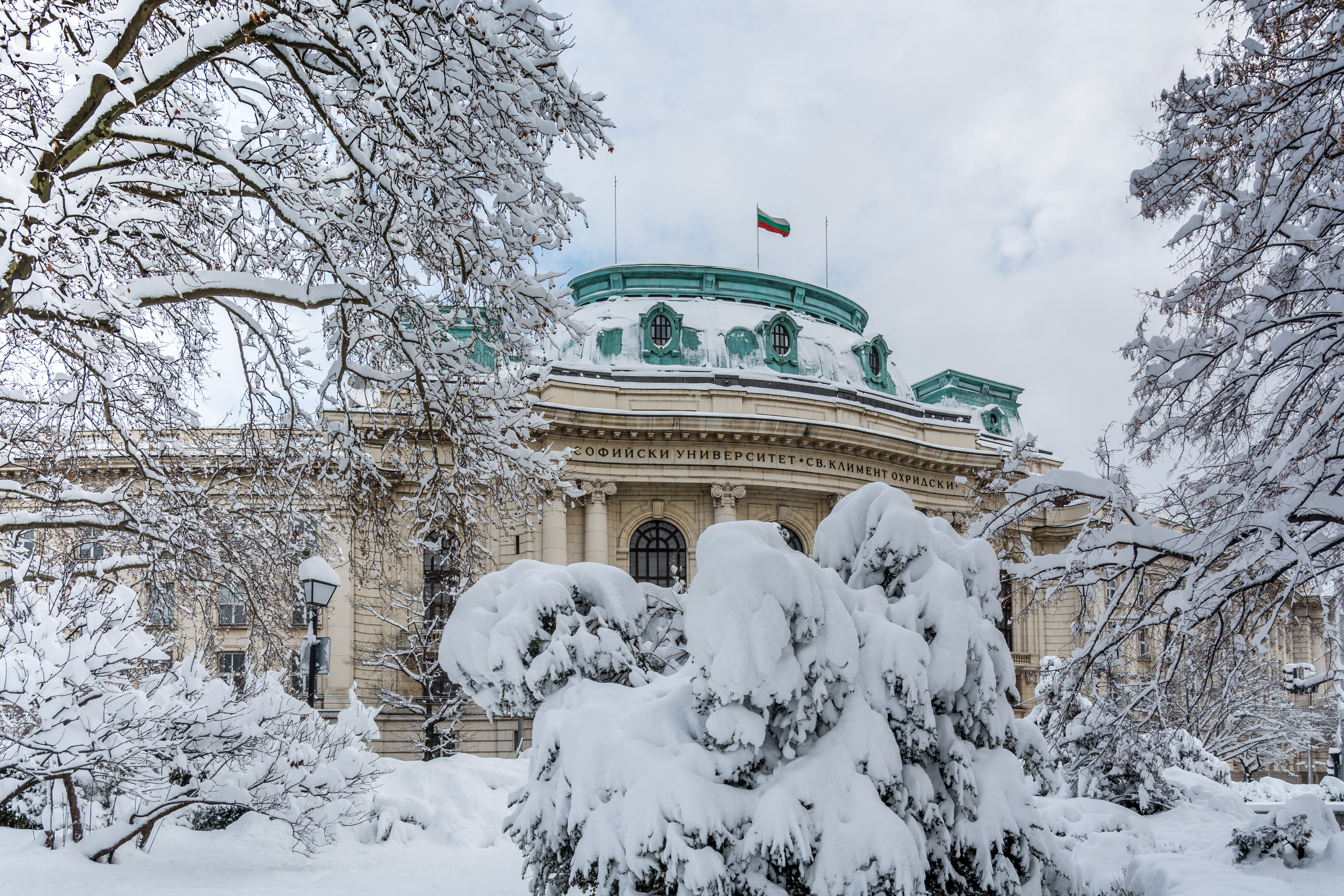
Sofia University

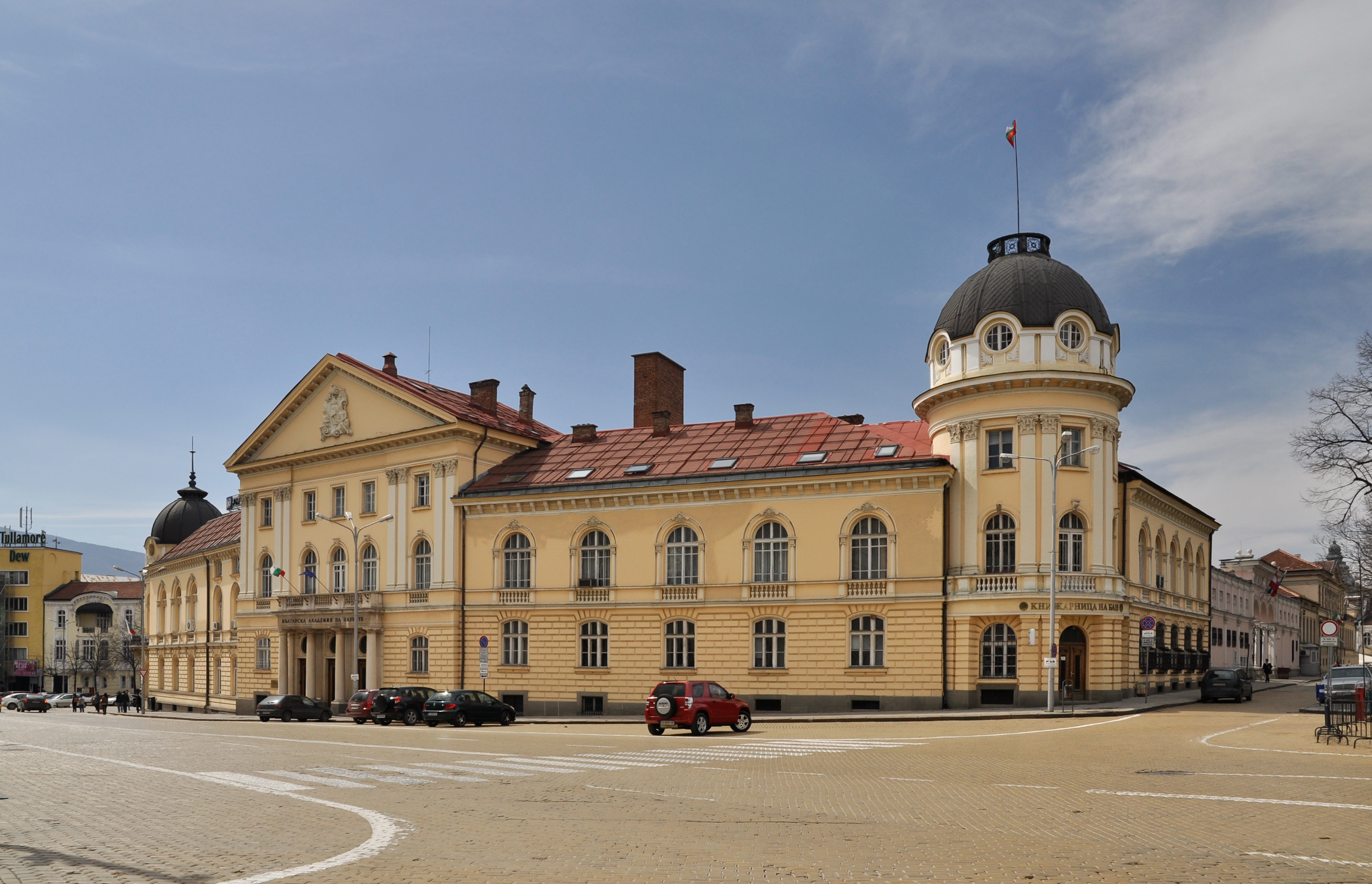
Bulgarian Academy of Sciences

Much of Bulgaria's educational capacity is concentrated in Sofia. There are 221 general, 11 special and seven arts or sports schools, 56 vocational gymnasiums and colleges, and four independent colleges. The city also hosts 23 of Bulgaria's 51 higher education establishments and more than 105,000 university students. The American College of Sofia, a private secondary school with roots in a school founded by American missionaries in 1860, is among the oldest American educational institutions outside of the United States.

A number of secondary language schools provide education in a selected foreign language. These include the First English Language School, 91st German Language School, 164th Spanish Language School, and the Lycée Français. These are among the most sought-after secondary schools, along with Vladislav the Grammarian 73rd Secondary School and the High School of Mathematics, which topped the 2018 preference list for high school candidates.

Higher education includes four of the five highest-ranking national universities – Sofia University (SU), the Technical University of Sofia, New Bulgarian University, and the Medical University of Sofia. Sofia University was founded in 1888. More than 20,000 students study in its 16 faculties. A number of research and cultural departments operate within SU, including its own publishing house, botanical gardens, a space research centre, a quantum electronics department, and a Confucius Institute. Rakovski Defence and Staff College, the National Academy of Art, the University of Architecture, Civil Engineering and Geodesy, the University of National and World Economy, and the University of Mining and Geology are other major higher education establishments in the city.

Other institutions of national significance, such as the Bulgarian Academy of Sciences (BAS) and the SS. Cyril and Methodius National Library, are located in Sofia. BAS is the centrepiece of scientific research in Bulgaria, employing more than 4,500 scientists in various institutes. Its Institute of Nuclear Research and Nuclear Energy will operate the largest cyclotron in the country. All five of Bulgaria's supercomputers and supercomputing clusters are located in Sofia as well. Three of those are operated by the BAS; one by Sofia Tech Park and one by the Faculty of Physics at Sofia University.

== International relations ==
=== Twin towns – sister cities ===
Sofia is twinned with:

- Algiers, Algeria
- Amman, Jordan
- Ankara, Turkey
- Bucharest, Romania
- Doha, Qatar
- Kyiv, Ukraine
- Pittsburgh, United States
- Salalah, Oman
- Shanghai, China
- Sidon, Lebanon
- Tel Aviv, Israel
- (Georgia (country)) Tbilisi, Georgia

=== Cooperation agreements ===
In addition Sofia cooperates with:

- Budapest, Hungary
- Paris, France
- Lisbon, Portugal
- Madrid, Spain
- Yerevan, Armenia

== Mass media ==
=== Public ===
- Bulgarian News Agency (1898)
- Bulgarian National Radio (1935)
- Bulgarian National Television (1959)

=== Private ===
- Nova Broadcasting Group (1994)
- bTV Media Group (2000)

== Notable ==
- Todor Kobakov (born 1978), composer, producer, arranger and pianist based in Toronto, Ontario Canada

== See also ==
- List of churches in Sofia
- List of shopping malls in Sofia
- List of tallest buildings in Sofia
- Sofia Province
- Monument to the Tsar Liberator
