= Timeline of Sofia =

The following is a timeline of the history of the city of Sofia, Bulgaria.

== Prior to 14th century ==
- 2nd C. CE – Serdica founded by Trajan.
- 268 CE – Serdica raided by Goths.
- 343 CE – Council of Serdica convenes (approximate date).
- 4th C.
  - Church of St. George
  - Amphitheatre of Serdica built (approximate date).
  - Saint Sophia Church, Sofia originates.
- 447 – Town burned by Huns.
- 809 -
  - Town becomes part of Bulgarian Empire.
  - Town renamed "Sredetz."
- 987 - Successful resistance to the attacks of the emperor Basil II.
- 11th C. – Boyana Church built near town (approximate date).
- 1194
  - Town becomes part of Byzantium.
  - Town renamed "Triaditsa" (approximate date).

== 14th–18th centuries ==
- 13th C. – Church of St. Nicholas built.
- 1329 – Town renamed "Sofia".
- 1382 – Ottomans take Sofia.
- 1443 – Town occupied briefly by Hungarian forces under John Hunyadi.
- 1493 – Kremikovtsi Monastery reestablished near Sofia.
- 1494 – Buyuk Mosque built.
- 1528 – Black Mosque built.
- 1576 – Banya Bashi Mosque built.
- 1610 – Catholic See of Sophia established.

== 19th century ==
- 1818 – Earthquake.
- 1829 – Town occupied by Russian forces.
- 1858 – Earthquake.
- 1863 – St Nedelya Church rebuilt.
- 1878 – Town liberated by Russian forces.
- 1879
  - Capital of Bulgaria relocated to Sofia from Veliko Tarnovo.
  - Area of city: 3 square kilometers.
- 1881 – Population: 20,501.
- 1882 – Royal palace built.
- 1884 – Boris' Garden (park) laid out.
- 1886 – National Assembly building constructed.
- 1888
  - Sofia University founded.
  - Sofia Central Station and Sofia Zoo open.
  - Dimitar Petkov becomes mayor.
- 1890 – 31 May: "Destructive thunderstorm."
- 1891 – Eagles' Bridge and Lions' Bridge built.
- 1893
  - Bulgarian Literary Society relocates to Sofia.
  - Population: 46,593.
- 1897 – Battenberg Mausoleum erected.
- 1898 – Central Hunters' Society headquartered in Sofia.

== 20th century ==
- 1903
  - Bulgarian Social Democratic Workers' Party (Narrow Socialists) headquartered in Sofia.
  - Sveti Sedmochislenitsi Church inaugurated.
- 1904 – National Theatre founded.
- 1905 – National Archaeological Museum opens.
- 1907
  - Central Military Club built.
  - Population: 82,187.
  - The Monument to the Tsar Liberator was inaugurated on Tsar Osvoboditel Boulevard in Sofia
- 1908
  - Bulgarian Opera Society established.
  - City becomes capital of the Kingdom of Bulgaria.
- 1909 – Sofia Synagogue built.
- 1910 – Population: 102,812.
- 1911
  - Central Sofia Market Hall opens.
  - Union of Bulgarian Chitalishta headquartered in Sofia.
- 1912 – Alexander Nevsky Cathedral built.
- 1913 – L'écho de Bulgarie newspaper begins publication.
- 1914
  - Levski Sofia (sports club) founded.
  - Russian Church consecrated.
  - Vrana Palace built near Sofia.
- 1919 – Simplon Orient Express (Paris–Sofia) begins operating.
- 1922 – National Opera established.
- 1925
  - 16 April: St Nedelya Church assault.
  - Thracian student society founded.
- 1926 – Vladimir Vazov becomes mayor.
- 1927 – Kino Vlaikova (cinema) established (approximate date).
- 1929 – Ivan Vazov National Theatre rebuilt.
- 1930 – Church of St Paraskeva built.
- 1934
  - City becomes seat of Sofia Oblast.
  - Population: 287,095; department 1,152,053.
  - French Institute built on Slaveykov Square.
- 1939
  - Bulgarian National Bank built.
  - Area of city: 42 square kilometers.
- 1940 – Sofia Court House built on Vitosha Boulevard.
- 1943 – Bombing of Sofia in World War II by Allied forces.
- 1944 – Bombing of Sofia in World War II by Allied forces.
- 1946 – City becomes capital of the People's Republic of Bulgaria.
- 1949 – Sofia Power Plant commissioned.
- 1951 – Vecherni Novini newspaper begins publication.
- 1953 – Vasil Levski National Stadium and National Opera and Ballet building open.
- 1955 – Communist Party Centre built.
- 1956 – Park Hotel Moskva built.
- 1959 – Borisova Gradina TV Tower erected.
- 1962 – Boyana Film studio established.
- 1963 – Georgi Asparuhov Stadium opens.
- 1964 – Population: 739,200 urban agglomeration.
- 1965 – Theatre 199 founded.
- 1968 – City hosts World Festival of Youth and Students.
- 1974 – Sofia Central Station rebuilt.
- 1976 – Hemus Hotel built.
- 1977 – Princess Hotel Sofia built.
- 1978 – CITUB Administrative Building built.
- 1979 – Hotel Rodina and Vitosha New Otani (hotel) built.
- 1981 – National Palace of Culture opens.
- 1984 – Population: 1,097,791 (estimate).
- 1991
  - New Bulgarian University and Higher Islamic Institute established.
  - Alexander Yanchulev becomes the first democratically elected mayor of Sofia.
  - Odeon Cinema active.
- 1993 – June: Union of Democratic Forces demonstration.
- 1995 – Stefan Sofiyanski becomes mayor.
- 1997
  - January: 1997 Bulgarian protest.
  - Sofia Film Festival begins.
- 1998 – Sofia Metro begins operating.

== 21st century ==
- 2001
  - November: Protest.
  - Iceberg Sofia hockey team formed.
- 2003
  - Radio Nova begins broadcasting.
  - City plan "Sofia 2020" adopted.
- 2004 – Central Bus Station Sofia opens.
- 2005
  - Boyko Borisov becomes mayor.
  - Suhodol, Sofia landfill protest.
- 2006
  - Mall of Sofia in business.
  - Kino Cineplex opens.
  - Cathedral of St Joseph rebuilt.
- 2007
  - Olympia Sofia women's football club established.
  - Bulgaria becomes part of the European Union.
- 2008
  - Sofia Pride begins.
  - 3 July: 2008 Chelopechene explosions.
- 2009
  - Sofia Middle East & North Africa Film Festival begins.
  - Yordanka Fandakova becomes mayor.
  - Benchmark Tower built.
- 2011
  - September: Anti-Roma demonstration.
  - Armeets Arena and Sofia Arsenal Museum of Contemporary Art opens.
  - Sopharma Business Center towers built.
- 2012
  - Line 2 of Sofia Metro began operation.
  - Population: 1,241,396.
- 2013
  - February: Protest against the Borisov cabinet.
  - June: Protest against the Oresharski cabinet.
- 2015
  - Capital Fort became the tallest building in Sofia with its 126 meters (413 ft).
  - Junior Eurovision Song Contest 2015 held.
- 2017 – Millennium Center was completed.
- 2020 – Sofia Metro Line 3 is set to open.

== See also ==
- History of Sofia
- List of mayors of Sofia
- Timelines of other cities in Bulgaria: Plovdiv, Varna
- List of the oldest buildings in Sofia

== Bibliography ==
- "Sophia", Handbook for Travellers in Turkey (3rd ed.), London: J. Murray, 1854, OCLC 2145740
- "Sofia". Chambers's Encyclopaedia. London. 1901.
- "Sofia", Türkei, Rumänien, Serbien, Bulgarien [Turkey, Romania, Serbia, Bulgaria], Meyers Reisebücher (in German) (6th ed.), Leipzig: Bibliographisches Institut, 1902, hdl:2027/njp.32101064637836
- Bourchier, James David (1910). "Sofia" . Encyclopædia Britannica. Vol. 25 (11th ed.). pp. 344–345.
- Benjamin Vincent (1910), "Sofia", Haydn's Dictionary of Dates (25th ed.), London: Ward, Lock & Co.
- S. Vailhe (1913). "Sardica". Catholic Encyclopedia. New York.
- William Harman Black (1920). "Bulgaria: Sofia". The Real Europe Pocket Guide-Book. Black's Blue Books. New York: Brentano's.
- "Sofia". Bulgaria Guide Book. Bulgaria: Balkantourist. 1959.
- Philip Ward (1993). Sofia: portrait of a city. Cambridge, England: Oleander. ISBN 0906672651.
- "Bulgaria: Sofia", Eastern and Central Europe (17th ed.), Fodor's, 1996, OL 7697674M
- Trudy Ring, ed. (1996). "Sofia". Southern Europe. International Dictionary of Historic Places. Vol. 3. Fitzroy Dearborn. OCLC 31045650.
- Irina Gigova (2011). "The City and the Nation: Sofia's Trajectory from Glory to Rubble in WWII". Journal of Urban History. 37.
- Sonia Hirt (2011). "Integrating City and Nature: Urban Planning Debates in Sofia, Bulgaria". Greening the City: Urban Landscapes in the Twentieth Century. University of Virginia Press. ISBN 978-0-8139-3114-2.
- Roman A. Cybriwsky (2013). "Sofia". Capital Cities around the World: An Encyclopedia of Geography, History, and Culture. ABC-CLIO. p. 282+. ISBN 978-1-61069-248-9.
