= List of oldest buildings in Sofia =

This article attempts to list the oldest buildings in the city of Sofia, Bulgaria, including the oldest temples and any other surviving structures. In most instances, buildings listed here were reconstructed numerous times and only fragments of the original buildings have survived. Some dates are approximate and based on architectural studies and historical records. In order to qualify for the list a structure must:

- be a recognisable building (defined as any human-made structure used or intended for supporting or sheltering any use or continuous occupancy);
- incorporate features of building work from the claimed date to at least 1.5 metres (4.9 ft) in height.

This consciously excludes ruins of limited height, roads and statues.

Building	Location	Year built	Photo
Saint George Rotunda	Kaloyan Street; 42°41′49″N 23°19′22″E	4th century	
Saint Sofia Church	Paris Street, 2; 42°41′48″N 23°19′53″E	4th - 6th century	
Boyana Church	Boyana Quarter; 42°38′41″N 23°15′58″E	10th century - early 11th century	
Saint Petka of the Saddlers Church	Marie Louise Boulevard, 2; 42°41′52″N 23°19′20″E	11th century	
Saint Elijah Church	Ilientsi Quarter; 42°45′8″N 23°18′27″E	12th or 16th century	
Saint Petka Church	Kaloyan Street 9; 42°41′47″N 23°19′21″E	13th century (1241 - 1257)	
Saint Nicholas Mirlikiyski Church	Kaloyan Street, 8; 42°41′45″N 23°19′22″E	13th century (1263)	
National Archaeological Museum	Saborna street, 2	15th century (1451 – 1494)	
The church of Dragalevtsi Monastery	near Dragalevtsi Quarter	15th century (1476)	
The old church of Kremikovtsi Monastery	near Kremikovtsi Quarter	15th century (1493)	
Saints Sedmochislenitsi Church	Graf Ignatiev Street, 25; 42°41′24″N 23°19′39″E	16th century (1528)	
Banya Bashi Mosque	Marie Louise Boulevard, 18	16th century (1576)	
The Old Wall	Stara Stena Street	16th or 17th century	

== Other structures ==
The following are old constructions, mostly ruins that might not fit the above criteria for a building.

Building	Location	Year built	Photo
Neolithic settlement of Slatina	Slatina, Boulevard Shipchenski Prohod	6000 BC	
Amphitheatre of Serdica	2 Budapest Street	3rd -4th century	
Tomb of Honorius	next to Saint Sofia Church entrance	5th -6th century	
Necropolis and three earlier churches	Under Saint Sofia Church	3rd -6th century	
Western Serdica Gate	146 Boris I Str. (Near Saint Joseph Cathedral)	2nd century(176 -180)	
Eastern Serdica Gate	Largo subway	2nd century(176 -180)	
Ancient Cultural and Communication Complex "Serdica"	Sofia, 1 Nezavisimost Sq, 2 Maria Luiza Blvd(Largo subway and Serdika Metro Station)	3rd century - 6th century	
North Eastern Serdica Tower	1 Iskar Str.	3rd - 5th century	
St. George Rotunda archeological complex	around St. George Rotunda	3rd - 4th century	
Lozenets Mausoleum	Lozenets, 110, D.Hadzhikotsev Str	4th - 5th century	
St Spas Church remains	Sveta Nedelya square 7	11th - 12th century or 15th - 16th century	
Ottoman Barracks	2 Shipka Street	16th century	

== See also ==
- List of oldest church buildings
- List of churches in Sofia
- Ancient Roman architecture
- Byzantine architecture
- History of Sofia
- Timeline of Sofia history
- List of oldest buildings in Varna
