= List of churches in Sofia =

This is a list of Christian churches within the city limits of Sofia - the Bulgarian capital city. The city is the centre of the Sofia ecclesiastical district as well as a centre of the Sofia eparchy (diocese), part of The Bulgarian Orthodox Church.

== Bulgarian Orthodox Churches ==
Temple name (English)	Temple name (Bulgarian)	Location	Year built	Photo
Awakening Church, Sofia	Модерна протестантска църква, Църква Пробуждане	ulitsa Varbitsa 12; 42.6954631°N 23.3437113°E	13 December 2015	
Alexander Nevsky Cathedral	Катедрален храм-паметник Александър Невски	Alexander Nevsky Square; 42°41′45″N 23°19′58″E	1882-1912	
Saint Andrew Church	Църква Свети Андрей	Opalchenska Street, 112; 42°42′35″N 23°18′51″E	1926	
Saint Boris Church	Църква Свети Цар Борис І	Pheniks Street, Ovcha Kupel Quarter; 42°41′17″N 23°14′53″E	during 20th century	
Boyana Church	Боянска църква	Boyana Quarter; 42°38′41″N 23°15′58″E	10th - 13th - 19th century	
Saint Clement of Ohrid Church	Църква Свети Климент Охридски	Jawaharlal Nehru Boulevard 1, Lyulin 6 Quarter; 42°42′57″N 23°15′9″E	1999	
Saints Constantine and Helena Church	Църква Свети Константин и Елена	Odrin Street 91; 42°42′7″N 23°18′15″E		
Saints Cyril and Methodius Church	Църква Св. св. Кирил и Методий	George Washington Street 47; 42°42′13″N 23°19′18″E	1897 г. – 10.05.1909	
Saints Cyril and Methodius Church	Църква Св. св. Кирил и Методий	Tsaritsa Eleonora Street 6, Krasno Selo Quarter; 42°40′31″N 23°16′51″E	1923	
Saint Demetrius Church	Църква Свети Димитър	Vasil Petleshkov Street 70, Hadzhi Dimitar Quarter; 42°42′22″N 23°20′51″E	1922/1956	
Dormition of the Mother of God Church	Църква Свето Успение Богородично	Otechestvo Street 3, Hipodruma Quarter; 42°40′45″N 23°17′58″E	1929	
Dormition of the Mother of God Church	Църква Свето Успение Богородично	Uchilishtna Street 8, Orlandovtsi Quarter; 42°43′4″N 23°20′52″E	1905	
Dormition of the Mother of God Church	Църква Свето Успение Богородично	Obelya Quarter; 42°44′34″N 23°16′3″E	1925 – 1927	
Dormition of the Mother of God Church	Църква Свето Успение Богородично	Zavodska Street, Central Sofia Cemetery; 42°42′47″N 23°20′0″E	1885	
Saint Elijah Church	Църква Свети пророк Илия	Tsar Boris III Boulevard 357, Knyazhevo Quarter; 42°39′32″N 23°14′33″E	1888 – 1893 (20.07.1888 – 20.07.1893)	
Saint Elijah Church	Църква Свети пророк Илия	Tsvetan Lazarov Boulevard, Druzhba 2 Quarter; 42°39′17″N 23°23′59″E	1995	
Saint Elijah Church	Църква Свети пророк Илия	Ilientsi Quarter; 42°45′8″N 23°18′27″E	12th or 16th century	
Saint George Rotunda	Ротонда Свети Георги	Kaloyan Street; 42°41′49″N 23°19′22″E	4th century	
Saint George Church	Църква Свети Георги	Patriarch Evtimiy Boulevard, 90; 42°41′23″N 23°18′58″E	1899 – 1909	
Saint George Church	Църква Свети Георги	Sofiysko Pole Street, 18, Darvenitsa Quarter; 42°39′11″N 23°21′54″E	1885 – 1886	
Saint George Chapel	Параклис Свети Георги	Gerena Sports Complex, Suha Reka Quarter; 42°42′16″N 23°21′44″E	2003 – 2015	
Saint George Church	Църква Свети Георги	Suhodol Quarter; 42°41′48″N 23°13′22″E	1958	
Saint George Church	Църква Свети Георги	Gorublyane Quarter; 42°37′35″N 23°24′28″E	1858 – 1975	
Intercession of the Mother of God Church	Църква Покров Богородичен	G.D. Zografina Street; 42°41′34″N 23°18′28″E		
Saint John of Rila Church	Църква Свети Йоан Рилски	Sofia Seminary; 42°40′34″N 23°20′14″E	1902-1904	
Saint Menas Church	Църква Свети Мина	The Old church street 28, Modern Suburb Quarter; 42°43′32″N 23°16′29″E	1938	
Saint Menas Church	Църква Свети Мина	Cherni Vrah Boulevard, Lozenets Quarter; 42°40′18″N 23°19′14″E	1996	
Saint Michael the Archangel Church	Църква Свети Архангел Михаил	Simeonovo Quarter; 42°36′42″N 23°20′25″E	1918	
Holy Mother of God Church	Църква Света Богородица	Poduene Quarter; 42°42′3″N 23°21′9″E	1881 – 1882	
Nativity of the Mother of God Church	Църква Рождество на Пресвета Богородица	Balkandzhi Yovo Street 18, Lagera Quarter; 42°40′55″N 23°17′16″E	after 1930	
Nativity of the Mother of God Church	Църква Рождество на Пресвета Богородица	Filipovtsi Quarter; 42°43′9″N 23°13′14″E		
Saint Naum of Ohrid Church	Църква Свети Наум Охридски	Druzhba I Quarter; 42°39′55″N 23°24′10″E	2002	
Saint Nedelya Church	Църква Света Неделя	Saint Nedelya Square; 42°41′48″N 23°19′17″E	10th century 1927-1933 (1856-1898)	
Saint Nicholas Mirlikiyski Church	Църква Свети Николай Мирликийски	Kaloyan Street, 8; 42°41′45″N 23°19′22″E	13th century ( 1263 -1950)	
Saint Nicholas Mirlikiyski Church	Църква Свети Николай Мирликийски	Ural Street 2, Gorna Banya Quarter; 42°40′38″N 23°14′19″E	1880 - 1882	
Saint Nicholas Sofiyski Church	Църква Свети Николай Софийски	Pirotska Street, 76; 42°42′6″N 23°18′36″E	1896 – 1900	
Saint Nicholas Church	Църква Свети Николай	T. Velev Street 11, Vrabnitsa Quarter; 42°44′23″N 23°17′28″E	1922 – 1925	
Saint Nicholas Church	Църква Свети Николай	Vrazhdebna Quarter; 42°42′49″N 23°24′51″E	1886	
Saint Paisius of Hilendar Church	Църква Свети Паисий Хилендарски	Gyueshevo Street 63, Serdika Quarter; 42°41′35″N 23°17′53″E		
Saint Panteleimon Church	Църква Свети Пантелеймон	Desislava Street 4, Boyana Quarter; 42°38′54″N 23°15′41″E	1950 – 1952	
Saint Paraskeva Church	Църква Света Параскева	Georgi S. Rakovski Street, 58; 42°41′5″N 23°19′44″E	1922 - 1930	
Saints Peter and Paul Church	Църква Свети апостоли Петър и Павел	Doctor Kalinkov Street 27; 42°41′51″N 23°17′45″E	1928 – 1932	
Presentation of the Mother of God Church	Църква Въведение Богородично	Druzhba Quarter; 42°39′45″N 23°24′1″E		
Saint Petka of the Saddlers Church	Църква Света Петка Самарджийска	Marie Louise Boulevard, 2; 42°41′52″N 23°19′20″E	11 - 16th century	
Saint Petka Church	Църква Света Петка	Kaloyan Street 9; 42°41′47″N 23°19′21″E	13th century (1241 - 1257)	
Saint Petka Church	Църква Света Петка	Mara Buneva Street 104, Orlandovtsi Quarter; 42°43′36″N 23°20′42″E	1885	
Holy Resurrection Church	Църква Свето Възкресение Господне	Vazkresenie Boulevard, 62, Krasna Polyana Quarter; 42°41′47″N 23°17′0″E	1922 – 1927	
Saints Sedmochislenitsi Church	Църква Свети Седмочисленици	Graf Ignatiev Street, 25; 42°41′24″N 23°19′39″E	1528 - 1901-1902	
Saint Sofia Church	Църква Света София	Paris Street, 2; 42°41′48″N 23°19′53″E	4th - 6th century	
Church of the Holy Spirit	Църква Свети Дух	Avksentiy Veleshki Street 32, Nadezhda Quarter; 42°43′39″N 23°18′18″E	1932	
Transfiguration of Jesus Church	Църква Свето Преображение Господне	Ralitsa Street 2, Lozenets Quarter; 42°40′58″N 23°19′26″E	1928 – 1945	
Holy Trinity Church	Църква Света Троица	Konstantin Velichkov Boulevard 28, Razsadnika Quarter; 42°42′16″N 23°17′52″E	1927 – 1928	
Holy Trinity Church	Църква Света Троица	Manastirska Street, Geo Milev Quarter; 42°41′5″N 23°21′51″E	1943	
Holy Trinity Church	Църква Света Троица	Bela Dona Street, Dragalevtsi Quarter; 42°37′48″N 23°18′35″E	1893 – 1898	

== Other Christian Temples ==
Temple name (English)	Temple name (Bulgarian)	Location	Year built	Notes	Photo
Saint Joseph Cathedral	Катедрала Свети Йосиф	Todor Aleksandrov Boulevard; 42°41′55″N 23°19′11″E	2002-2006	Roman Catholic	
Saint Nicholas the Miracle-Maker Church	Руска църква Свети Николай Чудотворец	Tsar Osvoboditel Boulevard; 42°41′44″N 23°19′44″E	1907-1914	Russian Orthodox Church	
Holy Trinity Church	Църква Света Троица	Knyaz Boris I Street, 152; 42°41′59″N 23°19′12″E	1905 – 1908	Romanian Orthodox Church	
First Evangelical Church	Първа Евангелска църква	Solunska Street; 42°41′35″N 23°19′2″E	1888 – 17.09.1889	Evangelical church	

== See also ==
- Archbishopric of Sardica
- Christianization of Bulgaria
- Bulgarian Orthodox Church
- Byzantine Revival architecture
- List of largest church buildings
- List of largest Eastern Orthodox church buildings
- List of oldest church buildings
- Ancient Roman architecture
- Basilica
- Rotunda (architecture)
- Edict of Serdica
- History of Sofia
- Timeline of Sofia history
- List of oldest buildings in Sofia
