= Timeline of Varna =

The following is a timeline of the history of the city of Varna, Bulgaria.

== Prior to 20th century ==
- 6th century BCE – Odessus founded by Greeks.
- 1st century CE – Romans in power.
- 1201 – Siege of Varna (1201) by forces of Kaloyan of Bulgaria.
- 1389 – Ottoman Turks in power.

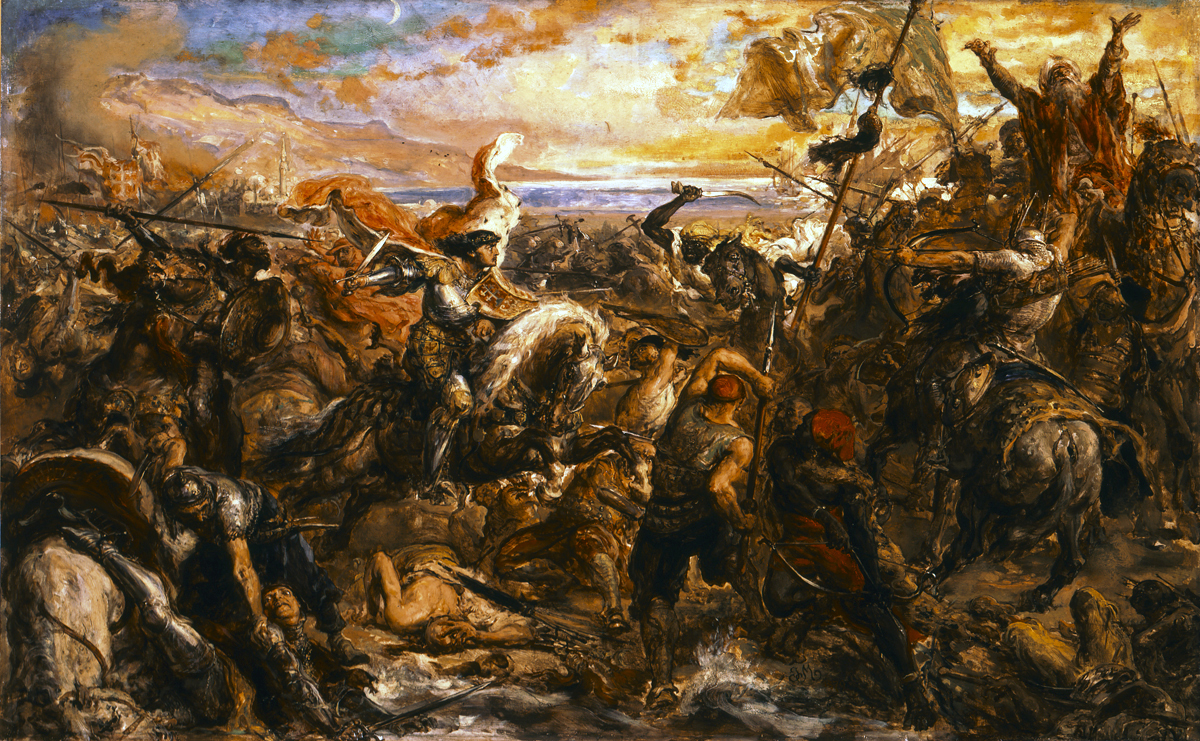
Battle of Varna, 19th-century painting by Jan Matejko

- 1444 – 10 November: Battle of Varna.
- 1606 – Varna sacked by Cossacks.
- 1828 – Siege of Varna.
- 1854 – During Crimean War, allied forces based temporarily at Varna.
- 1867 – Rustchuk–Varna railway begins operating.
- 1870 – Seat of a Bulgarian Bishop.
- 1871 – Slavic Orthodox Christian Eparchy of Varna and Veliki established.
- 1878 – Varna becomes part of newly restored independent Bulgaria per Treaty of Berlin (1878)
- 1883 – Orient Express railway begins operating.
- 1885 – Euxinograd palace built near Varna.
- 1886 – Dormition of the Mother of God Cathedral, Varna built.
- 1888
  - Varna Archaeological Museum founded.
  - Population: 25,256.
- 1892 – Bulgarian Steamship Company in business.
- 1900 – Machine School for the Navy relocated to Varna.

== 20th century ==
- 1906
  - Port of Varna built.
  - Population: 37,155.
- 1912 – Alexander Vasilev (mayor) becomes mayor.
- 1913 – Reka Ticha sport club formed.
- 1915 – 27 October: Varna bombed by Russian forces.
- 1916 – 16 January: Varna bombed by Russian forces.
- 1918 – SC Sokol (football club) formed.
- 1921 – Stoyan Bachvarov Dramatic Theatre founded.
- 1923 – BC Cherno More basketball team founded.
- 1925 – Varna railway station opens.
- 1931 – Freedom begins publication.
- 1932 – Varna Aquarium opens.
- 1934
  - Radio Varna begins broadcasting.
  - City becomes capital of Varna oblast.
- 1935
  - Symbolic mausoleum of King Władysław III of Poland erected.
  - Yanko Mustakov becomes mayor.
- 1946 – Population: 77,792.
- 1949
  - Varna renamed "Stalin."
  - City becomes capital of the Stalin District.
- 1950 – Yuri Gagarin Stadium opens.
- 1957 – In vicinity of Varna, Golden Sands resort development begins.
- 1961
  - Institute of Medicine established.
  - Sea Garden (Varna) remodelled.
- 1962 – 15th Chess Olympiad held in Varna.
- 1964
  - Varna International Ballet Competition begins.
  - Population: 172,700.
  - John Hunyadi monument unveiled.

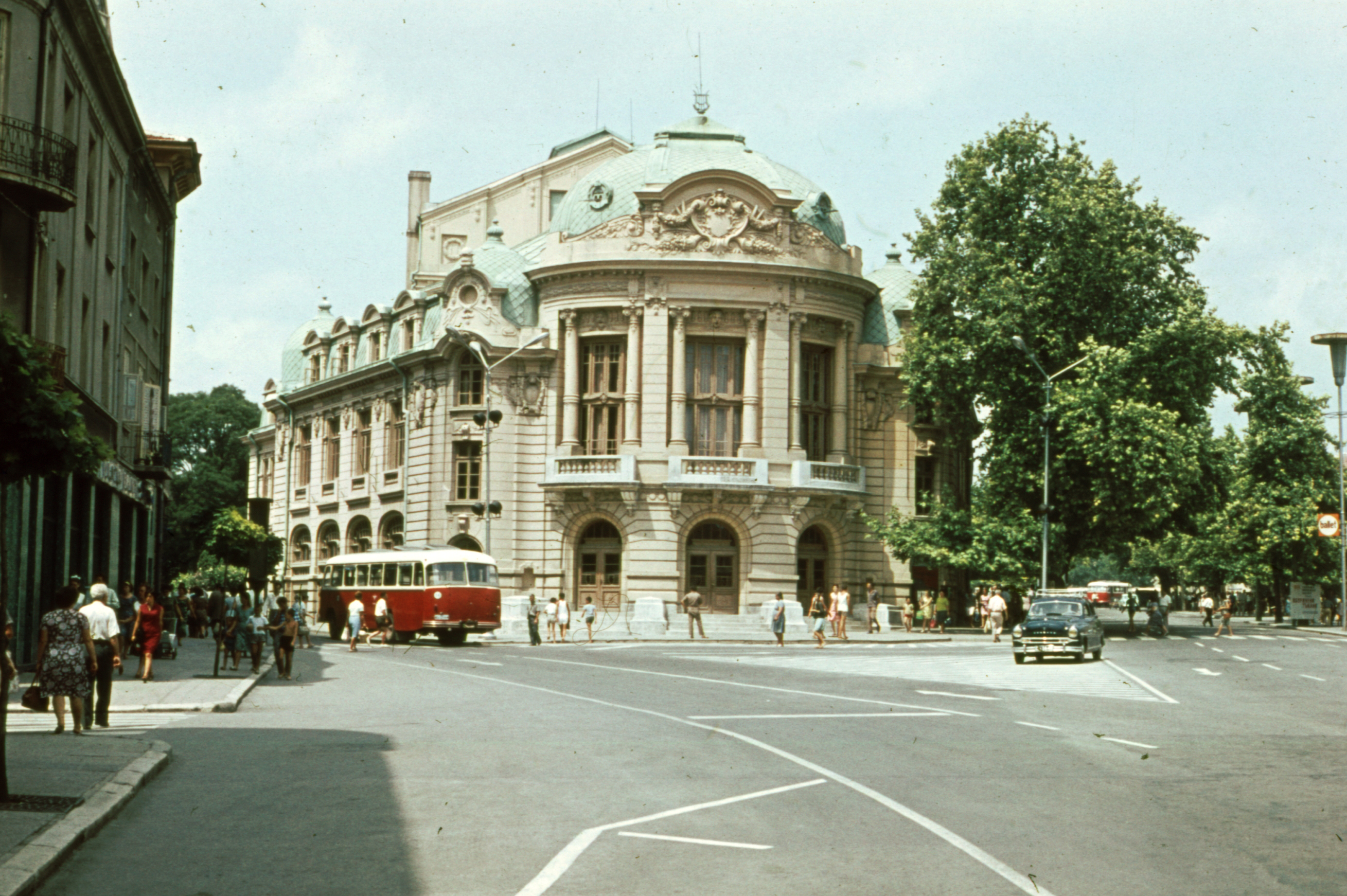
Varna in 1968

- 1968 – Ticha Stadium and Palace of Culture and Sports open.
- 1970 – Varna co-hosts the 1970 FIVB Volleyball Women's World Championship.
- 1972 – Varna Necropolis discovered.
- 1974 – Varna hosts the 1974 World Artistic Gymnastics Championships.
- 1976 – Asparuhov Bridge opens.
- 1979 – Varna hosts the 1979 European Weightlifting Championships.
- 1981 – Varna co-hosts the 1981 Men's European Volleyball Championship.
- 1985
  - Museum of Medicine History opened.
  - BC Cherno More wins its first Bulgarian basketball championship.
- 1986 – Trolleybuses begin operating.
- 1991 – Hristo Borisov Hall (sport arena) opens.
- 1993 – Population: 307,200 city; 313,034 urban agglomeration (estimate).
- 1994 – McDonald's in business.
- 1998 – Black Sea NGO Network headquartered in Varna.

== 21st century ==
- 2001
  - Varna co-hosts the 2001 Women's European Volleyball Championship.
  - Population: 314,539.
- 2008
  - Mall Varna (shopping centre) in business.
  - New Varna Stadium construction begins.
- 2011 – Population: 343,704 municipality.
- 2013
  - 2013 Bulgarian protests against the first Borisov cabinet.
  - 2013–14 Bulgarian protests against the Oresharski cabinet.
  - Air pollution in Varna reaches annual mean of 36 PM2.5 and 51 PM10, more than recommended.
  - Ivan Portnih becomes mayor.
- 2014 – June: 2014 Bulgarian floods.
- 2018 – Varna co-hosts the 2018 FIVB Volleyball Men's World Championship.
- 2021 – Varna hosts the 2021 Rhythmic Gymnastics European Championships.

== See also ==
- Varna history
- History of Varna
- List of mayors of Varna
- List of oldest buildings in Varna
- Timelines of other cities in Bulgaria: Plovdiv, Sofia

== Bibliography ==
Published in 19th century

- H. A. S. Dearborn (1819), "Varna", A Memoir on the Commerce and Navigation of the Black Sea, Boston: Wells & Lilly
- Josiah Conder (1830), "(Varna)", Turkey, Modern Traveller, vol. 14, London: J.Duncan
- John Macgregor (1844). "Bulgaria". Commercial Statistics. London: C. Knight and Co.
- "Varna", Handbook for Travellers in Turkey (3rd ed.), London: J. Murray, 1854, OCLC 2145740
- William Henry Overall, ed. (1870). "Varna". Dictionary of Chronology. London: William Tegg. hdl:2027/uc2.ark:/13960/t9m32q949.
- George Ripley; Charles A. Dana, eds. (1879). "Varna". American Cyclopedia (2nd ed.). New York: D. Appleton and Company.

Published in 20th century

- "Varna", Chambers's Encyclopaedia, London: W. & R. Chambers, 1901, hdl:2027/uc2.ark:/13960/t56d64f6t – via HathiTrust
- "Varna", Türkei, Rumänien, Serbien, Bulgarien [Turkey, Romania, Serbia, Bulgaria], Meyers Reisebücher (in German) (6th ed.), Leipzig: Bibliographisches Institut, 1902, hdl:2027/njp.32101064637836
- "Varna" . Encyclopædia Britannica. Vol. 27 (11th ed.). 1910. p. 922.
- Benjamin Vincent (1910), "Varna", Haydn's Dictionary of Dates (25th ed.), London: Ward, Lock & Co., hdl:2027/loc.ark:/13960/t89g6g776 – via HathiTrust
- British Admiralty, Naval Intelligence Division (1920), "Gazetteer of Towns: Varna", Handbook of Bulgaria, London: His Majesty's Stationery Office
- Fehim Bajraktarevic (1936). "Varna". Encyclopedia of Islam. Leiden: Brill. p. 1071. ISBN 978-90-04-09794-0.
- "Varna". Bulgaria Guide Book. Bulgaria: Balkantourist. 1959 – via Open Library.
- Dimiter Mihailov & Pancho Smolenov (1986). Bulgaria: a Guide. Translated by E. Yanev & R. Yossifova. Varna: Collet's, Sofia Press – via Open Library.
