= List of oldest buildings in Varna =

This article attempts to list the oldest buildings in the city of Varna, Bulgaria, including the oldest temples and any other surviving structures. In some instances, buildings listed here were reconstructed numerous times and only fragments of the original buildings have survived. Some dates are approximate and based on architectural studies and historical records. In order to qualify for the list a structure must:

- be a recognisable building (defined as any human-made structure used or intended for supporting or sheltering any use or continuous occupancy);
- incorporate features of building work from the claimed date to at least 1.5 metres (4.9 ft) in height.

This consciously excludes ruins of limited height, roads and statues.

| Building | Location | Year built | Photo |
|---|---|---|---|
| Roman Thermae | | 2nd century(157 AD supposed or after 161 AD) | |
| Dormition of the Mother of God church | | 1602 | |
| St. Petka church | | 1785 | |
| Varna Monastery | | 1830s | |
| Hayrie mosque | | 1835 | |
| St. Athanasius church | | 1838 | |
| St. Sarkis church | | 1844 | |
| Former port warehouse | | 1850 | |
| Museum of New History of Varna | | 1851 | |
| Saint Nicholas church | | 1859-1865 | |
| Ethnographic museum | | 1860 | |
| Stefanidi's house | | 1862 | |
| St. Michael church | | 1862 | |
| Darik Radio | | 1865 | |
| Parosiadi's house | | 1865 | |
| Medicine History museum | | 1868 - 1868 | |
| Azizie mosque | | 1869 | |
| House of architects | | after 1850 | |
| Former Spanish consulate | | after 1852 (1856) | |

== Other structures ==
The following are old constructions that do not fit the above criteria for a building, typically because they are ruins that no longer fit the height requirement specified above.

| Building | Location | Year built | Photo |
|---|---|---|---|
| Shkorpil's basilica in Dzhanavara | Asparuhovo | 4th - 5th century | |
| Small Roman Thermae | 17 Primorski Boulevard | 3rd - 4th century | |
| Royal Monastery "Virgin Mary" in Karaach teke | Vazrazhdane neighborhood | 9th century | |
| Early Christian Bishop basilica | Han Krum Street (N43°12'06 E27°55'05) | 4th - 6th century | |
| Early Christian basilica of Odessos | intersection of Tsar Simeon Street and Kozloduy Street(N43°12'02 E27°54'47) | 5th - 6th century | |
| Early Christian basilica of Odessos | intersection of Tsar Kaloyan Street and Knyaz Dondukov Street(N43°12'02,5 E27°55'07) | 6th century | |
| Early Christian basilica of Odessos | intersection of San Stefano Street and Chernorizets Hrabar Street (N43°11'56 E27°55'08) | 4th - 5th century | |
| Early Christian basilica of Odessos | 18, Sveti Kliment Ohridski Street (N43°12'05 E27°54'00) | 5th - 6th century | |
| Early Christian basilica of Odessos | intersection of Tsaribrod Street and Tsar Simeon Street (N43°12'01 E27°54'47) | 5th - 6th century | |
| Early Christian basilica of Odessos | Pop Bogomil Street (N43°12'01 E27°54'36,7) | 5th - 6th century | |
| Early Christian basilica in Borovets | Nature Park Borovets between Asparuhovo and Galata neighborhood | 4th - 6th century | |
| Early Christian basilica in Pirinch Tepe | Industrial Zone | 4th - 6th century | |
| Early Christian basilica in Kayalaka | Galata | 4th - 6th century | |
| Early Christian basilica in Sveti Iliya | Galata | 4th - 6th century | |

== See also ==
- Timeline of Varna
- List of oldest buildings in Sofia
