= Magdalina Stancheva =

Bulgarian archeologist (1924-2014)

- Магдалина Михайлова Станчева
- Born: Magdalina Mihailova Stancheva; 7 September 1924; Sofia, Bulgaria
- Died: 6 October 2014 (aged 90); Sofia, Bulgaria
- Occupations: archaeologist, museologist
- Years active: 1951-2004

Magdalina Stancheva (Bulgarian: Магдалина Михайлова Станчева, 7 September 1924 – 6 October 2014) was a Bulgarian archaeologist and museologist, recognized for her dedication in preserving Sofia's past. As one of the first museologists in the country, she influenced and taught many the scientific principals of conservation. She worked with both the International Council of Museums and UNESCO to designate national preservation sites and was recognized by many awards for her efforts in conserving the cultural history of the country, including the Order of Saints Cyril and Methodius, the National Order Of Labour, and a citation as an Honorary Citizen of Sofia.

== Early life ==
Magdalina Mihailova Stancheva was born on 7 September 1924 in Sofia, Bulgaria. She completed her secondary education at First Girls' High School in Sofia and the enrolled at the University of Sofia "St. Kliment Ohridski". During her schooling, she participated in rescue archaeology projects in the city center of Sofia, which was being rebuilt after bombings from World War II. She graduated in 1948 with a degree in classical philology and history.

== Career ==
In 1951, Stancheva was hired to work in the Sofia Municipal Museum and simultaneously to work on archaeologic projects of the facility. She proposed that the name be changed to the Historical Museum of Sofia, now known as the Sofia Regional Historical Museum, in 1952, and with the name change, she was hired as the senior curator. The following year she was appointed as head of the archaeology department of the museum. As one of the first museologists in the country, she led the museum's preservation efforts for the excavations of the Church of St Petka of the Saddlers, the rotunda of the Church of St. George, the eastern gate of the Serdica Fortress and many others. She also led excavations and participated in archaeological surveys of Sofia and throughout the country.

From the 1950s through the 1970s, Stancheva led the effort to preserve archaeological sites, through efforts to have them declared as heritage preservation locations. Working with the International Council of Museums and UNESCO, she presented successful candidacies for such projects as the Boyana Church, the Rila Monastery, and the Thracian Tomb of Kazanlak to receive recognition as cultural monuments to be preserved and protected. Writing articles on the history and archaeology of Sofia, conservation, the conflicts between the need to urbanize and the need to preserve history, Stancheva published over 600 titles in various languages about Bulgarian and Thracian history. She published for the Bulgarian Academy of Sciences and the Bulgarian Historical Society in such volumes as Announcements of the Archaeological Institute, Announcements of the Bulgarian Historical Society, Archeology (Bulgarian: Археология ISSN 0324-1203), Museums and Monuments of Culture Magazine and Sofia Magazine, among others.

In the early 1970s, Stancheva was appointed as a Bulgarian delegate to the International Council of Museums of Paris and the UNESCO World Cultural Heritage Committee. She served as vice president on the committee for six years and broadcast cultural programs on both Radio Sofia and Radio UNESCO to provide cultural education. She was awarded the Order of Saints Cyril and Methodius in both grades I and II for her preservation efforts, as well as being honored with the National Order Of Labour, Silver Class for her years of service, among many other awards. In 1985 Stancheva left the museum and active work as an archaeologist and began working as a voluntary consultant to the legislature and Ministry of Culture on legal protections for cultural heritage. She also taught at Sofia University as well as at the National Academy of Art and the New Bulgarian University, training dozens of museologists from throughout the country.

Stancheva's position on archaeology was founded in scientific evidence. She participated in two commissions over the question of whether Vasil Levski's grave had been found at St. Petka's and maintained the position that without proof, linking a person or event to a place, undermined the authority of historians and archaeologists. Nikolai Khaitov, a popular writer, accused Stancheva of participating in a conspiracy to prevent investigation into Levski's burial site and accused her publicly of mishandling the remains. She flatly denied that there was any attempt to hide the bones and maintained that when the skeleton labeled "No. 95" arrived at the museum, it was sent, as all other bones were, to Petîr Boev at the Archaeological Institute for examination. As the bones were lost, the commissions held that no substantive identification could be made.

In 1990, Stancheva designed a Cultural Heritage program for the New Bulgarian University and taught the courses in the program until 2004. After she retired from teaching, she continued researching and published two books, София: От древността до нови времена (Sofia: From antiquity to new times, 2009) and Мадарският конник (Madara Horseman, 2013). She was unanimously designated as an honorary citizen of Sofia for her life's work in 2010.

== Death and legacy ==
Stancheva died on 6 October 2014 in Sofia. Her personal papers, including books and documents from international congresses on archaeology and conservation were donated to the New Bulgarian University Library in 1997. She is known for having popularized preservation in Sofia.

== Selected works ==
- Bulgarie: 3 capitales anciennes; Pliska, Preslav, Tirnovo [Bulgaria: 3 ancient capitals—Pliska, Preslav, Tirnovo] (in French). Paris, France: Presses de l'Unesco. 1981. ISBN 978-9-232-01921-9.
- Archaeological Sites in Modern Bulgarian Towns. Sofia, Bulgaria: Sofia Press. 1982. OCLC 654813212.
- The Bulgarian Contribution to the World Cultural Heritage. Sofia, Bulgaria: Technika. 1989. OCLC 633363014. (with Dafina Vasileva).
- Nine Wonders of Bulgaria. Sofia, Bulgaria: Zlatostrouy. 1993. ISBN 978-9-548-15806-0.
- Veliki Preslav. Sofia, Bulgaria: Zlatostrouy. 1993. ISBN 978-9-548-15814-5.
- София: От древността до нови времена [Sofia: From antiquity to new times] (in Bulgarian). Sofia, Bulgaria: Nov bŭlgarski universitet. 2009. ISBN 978-9-545-35579-0.
- Мадарският конник [Madara Horseman] (in Bulgarian). Sofia, Bulgaria: Nov Bălgarski Univ. 2013. ISBN 978-9-545-35761-9.
