= Church of St Paraskeva, Sofia =

Bulgarian Orthodox church in Sofia, Bulgaria

Church of St Paraskeva
- църква "Света Параскева"
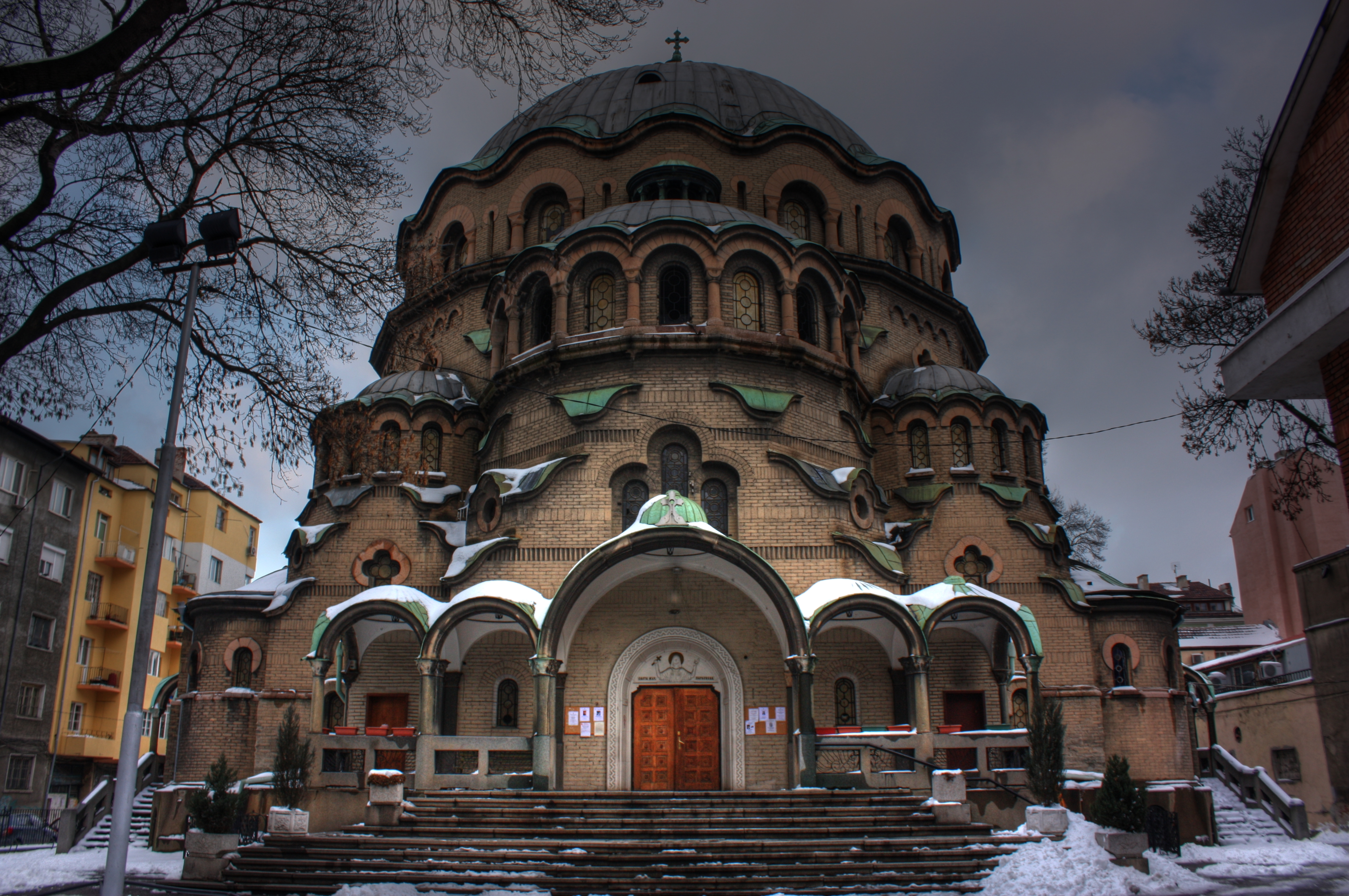
- Church of St Paraskeva

- Location of the church in Sofia
- Church of St Paraskeva
- 42°42′4″N 23°19′44″E
- Location: Georgi Rakovski Street, Sofia
- Country: Bulgaria
- Denomination: Eastern Orthodox
- Tradition: Bulgarian Orthodox

History
- Status: Church
- Dedication: Saint Paraskeva
- Consecrated: 1930

Architecture
- Architect: Anton Tornyov
- Architectural type: Church
- Completed: 1940

The Church of St Paraskeva (Bulgarian: църква "Света Параскева", tsarkva "Sveta Paraskeva") is a Bulgarian Orthodox church in Sofia, the capital of Bulgaria. The church, dedicated to Saint Paraskeva, is located on 58 Georgi Rakovski Street in the centre of the city. It is the third-largest church in Sofia.

== Overview ==
Plans to build a church at the site date to 1910, when Stuttgart-educated Bulgarian architect Anton Tornyov (1868–1942) won a competition for the church's design. Due to the Balkan Wars and World War I, however, the construction was postponed. In 1922, the church board of trustees announced another competition, which was again won by Tornyov. The construction of the Church of St Paraskeva was complete by 1930, but the finishing works on the porticos did not cease until 1940.

St Paraskeva has a somewhat unusual design for an Eastern Orthodox church. For example, the cella is in practice a round chamber over 20 metres (66 ft) in diameter. The cella gradually disintegrates into the surrounding apses.

== Gallery ==
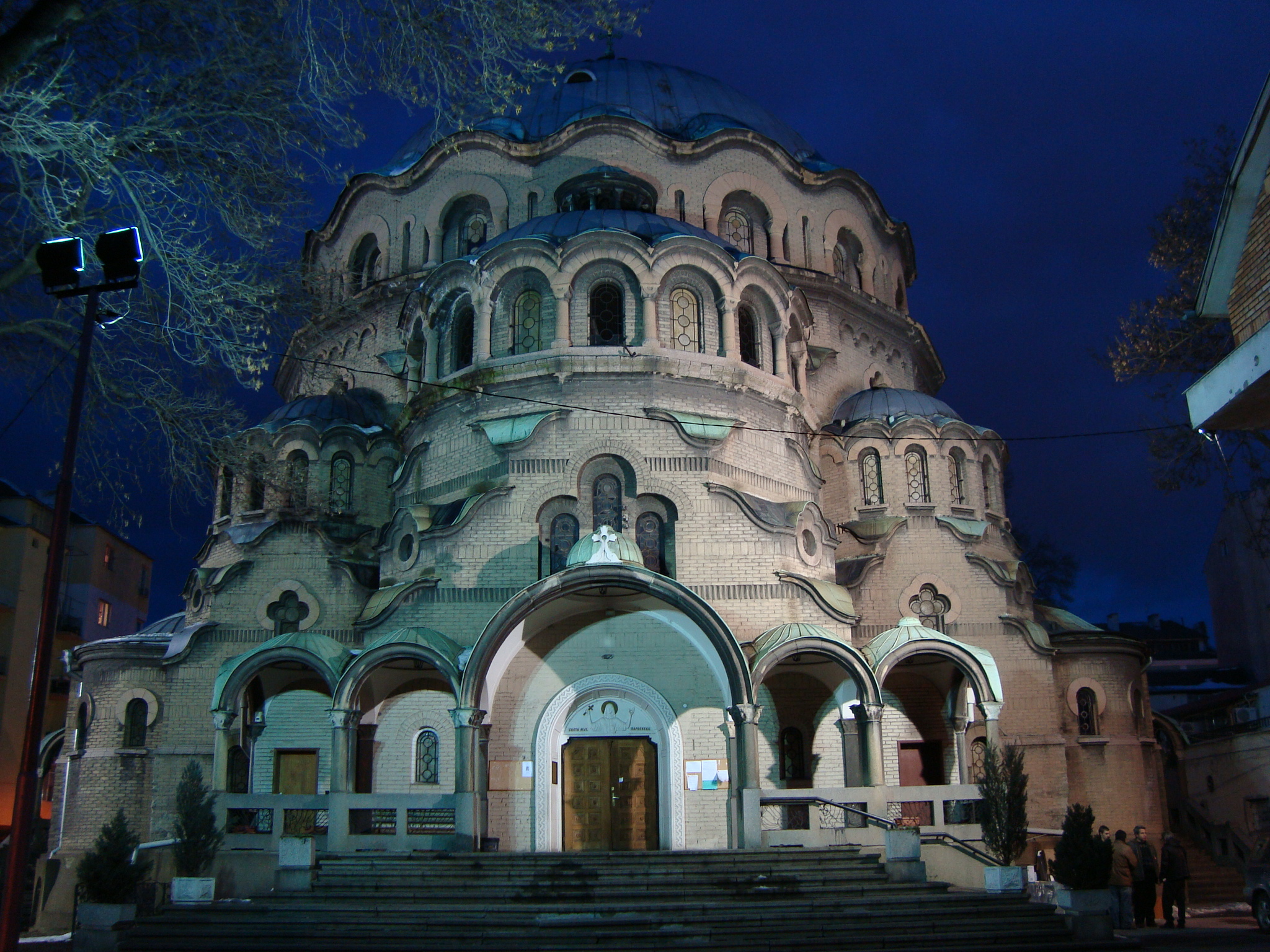
Night view of the church

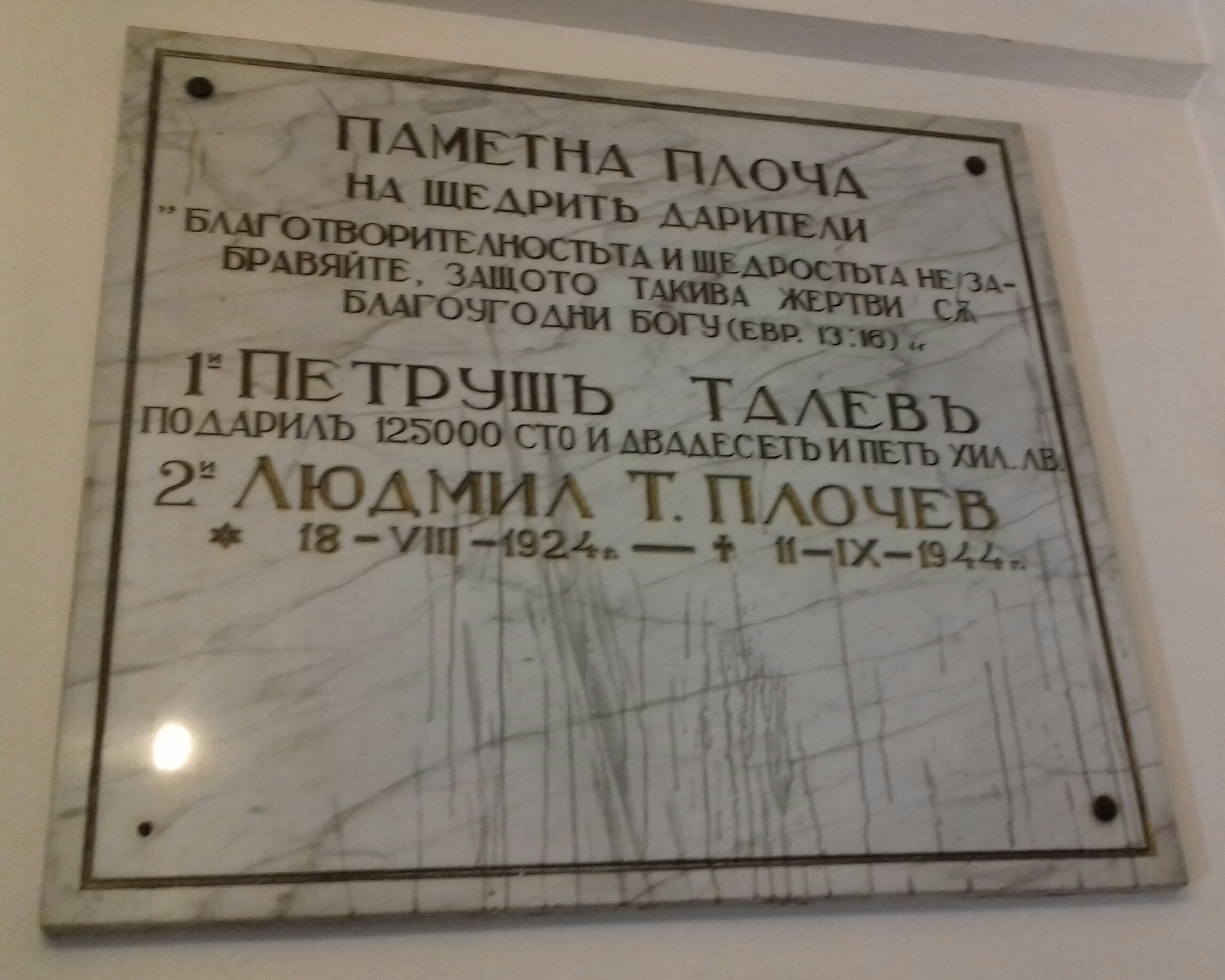
A memorial plaque

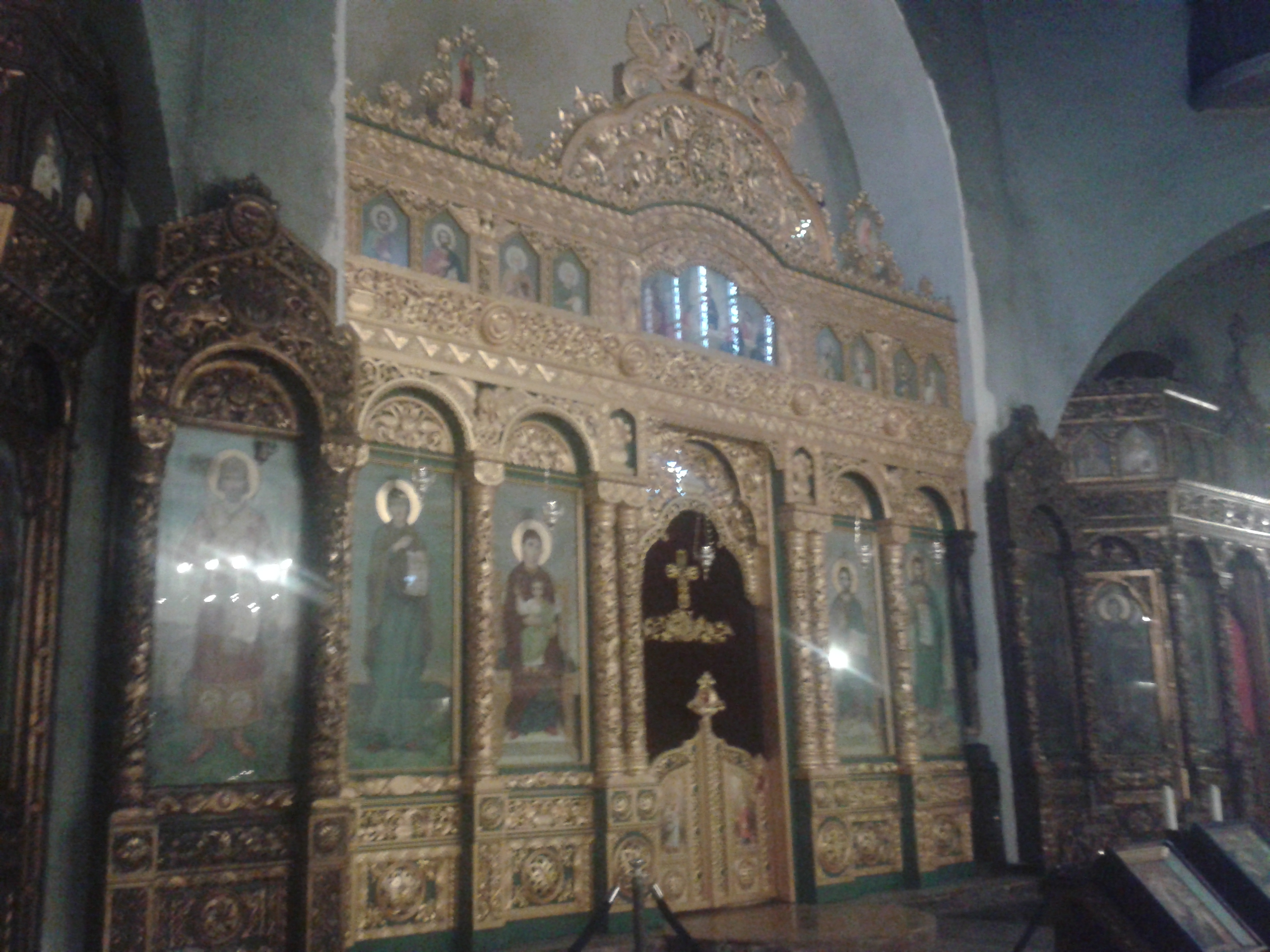
The church interior

== See also ==
- List of churches in Sofia
- Christianity in Bulgaria
