= Church of St Petka of the Saddlers =

Bulgarian Orthodox church in Sofia, Bulgaria

- Църква „Света Петка Самарджийска“
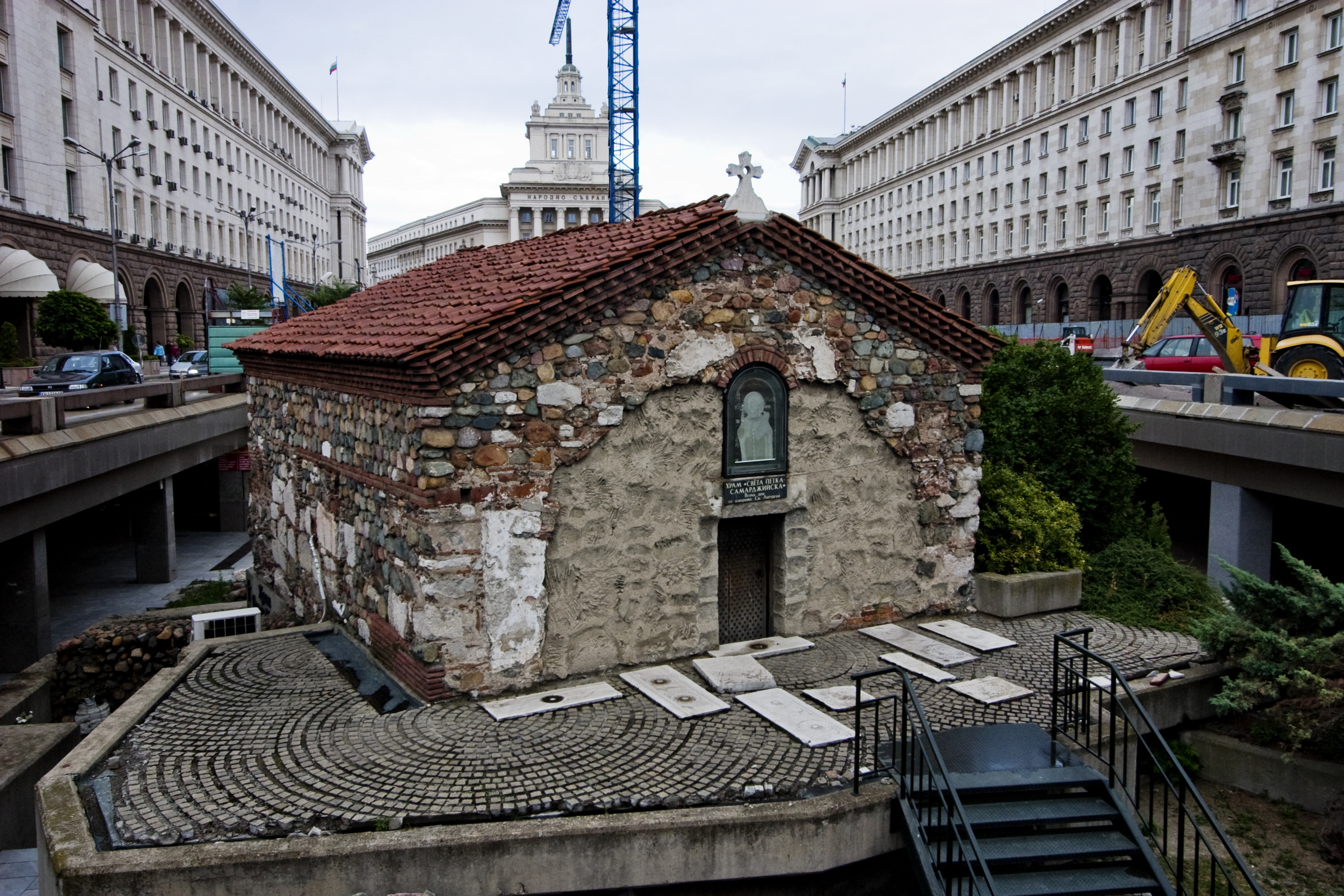
- The church in 2010

- Location of the church in Sofia
- Church of St Petka of the Saddlers
- 42°41′52″N 23°19′20″E
- Location: Sofia
- Country: Bulgaria
- Denomination: Eastern Orthodox
- Tradition: Bulgarian Orthodox

History
- Status: Church
- Dedication: Saint Petka of the Saddlers

Architecture
- Functional status: Active
- Architectural type: Church
- Completed: c. 14th - 16th Century CE

Specifications
- Materials: Bricks; stone

The Church of St Petka of the Saddlers (Bulgarian: Църква „Света Петка Самарджийска“) is a medieval Bulgarian Orthodox church in Sofia, the capital of Bulgaria. The church is located in a semi-submerged shopping mall, and can be accessed via the Serdika metro station.

== History ==
The church was first mentioned in the 16th century and was constructed at the place of a former Roman religious building. It is today a monument of culture known for its mural paintings from the 14th, 15th, 17th and 19th century depicting biblical scenes.

The church is dedicated to St Petka, an 11th-century Bulgarian saint. The Church of Saint Petka acquired its present name due to it being a patron of the saddlers in the Middle Ages, who performed their rituals in the church. The adjective samardzhiyski ("of the saddlers") was derived from the Ottoman Turkish word semerci, meaning "saddlemaker".

=== Archeology ===
According to one theory, Bulgarian national hero Vasil Levski is buried in the church. Press reports from 1937 retelling the stories of those who carried out a reburial, which might have been for Levski and reports from the 1956 excavation speculating that bones found might have been those indicated by the 1937 press, led to the skeleton labeled "No. 95", being sent for professional examination. When Magdalina Stancheva, museologist and head of the Archaeology Department at the Sofia Regional Historical Museum received the bones, she sent them to the laboratory run by Petîr Boev at the Archaeological Institute for examination. The bones were either destroyed by mice or lost. Nikolai Khaitov, a popular writer, accused Stancheva; archaeologists Georgi Dzhingov and Stamen Mikhailov; Krîstiu Miiatev, director of the Archaeological Institute; and Todor Pavlov, president of the National Academy of Bulgaria of participating in a conspiracy to prevent investigation into Levski's burial site and publicly accused Stancheva of mishandling the remains. Two commissions met over the controversy in the 1980s, and confirmed that there was no proof which could substantiate that the bones were Levski's, as the bones were missing.

== Architecture ==
It is a small one-naved building partially dug into the ground located in the very centre of both the modern and the antique city, in the TZUM underpass. The church features a semi-cylindrical vault, a hemispherical apse, and a crypt discovered during excavations after World War II. The walls are 1-metre (3.3 ft) thick and made from brick and stone.

== Gallery ==
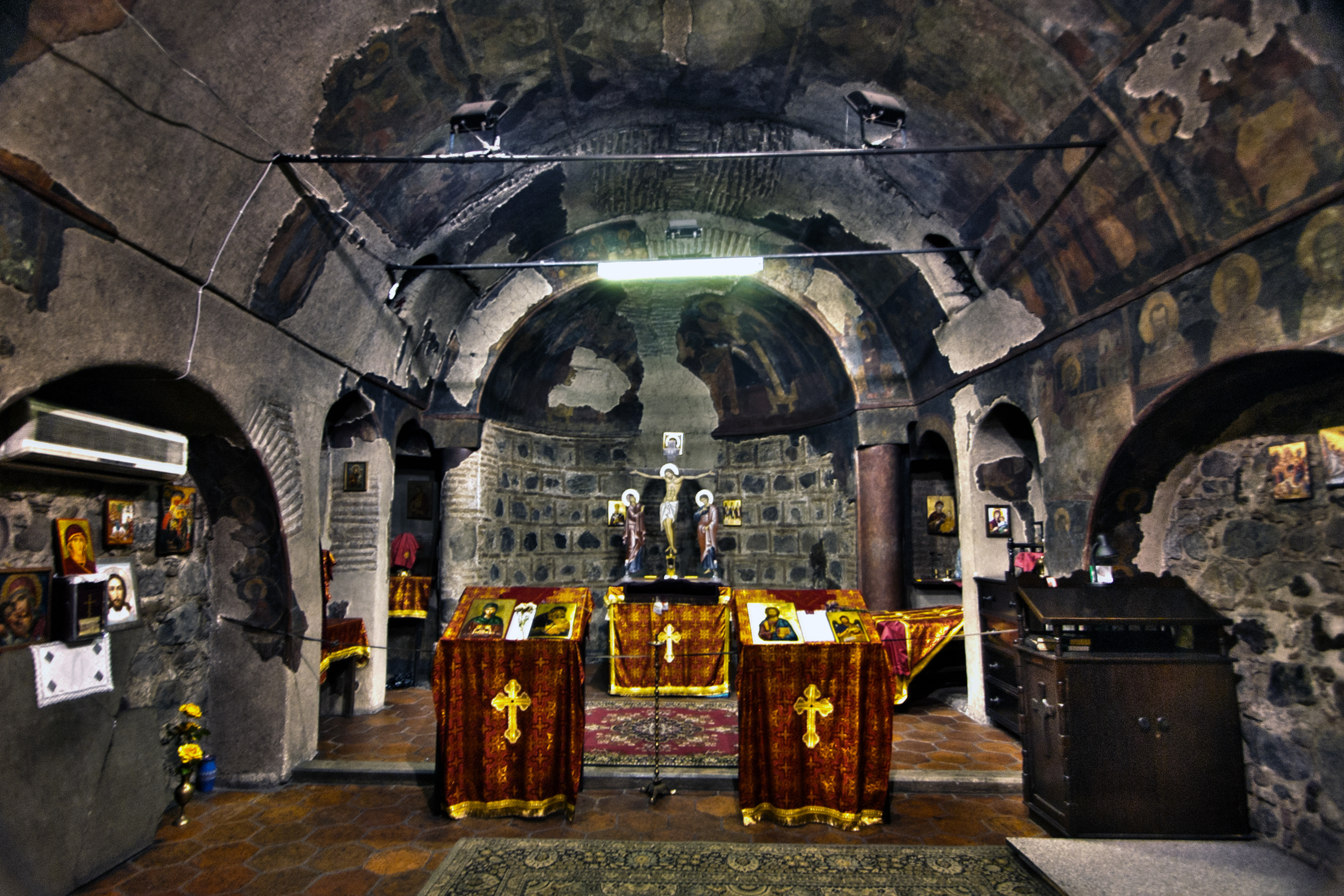
The interior of the church

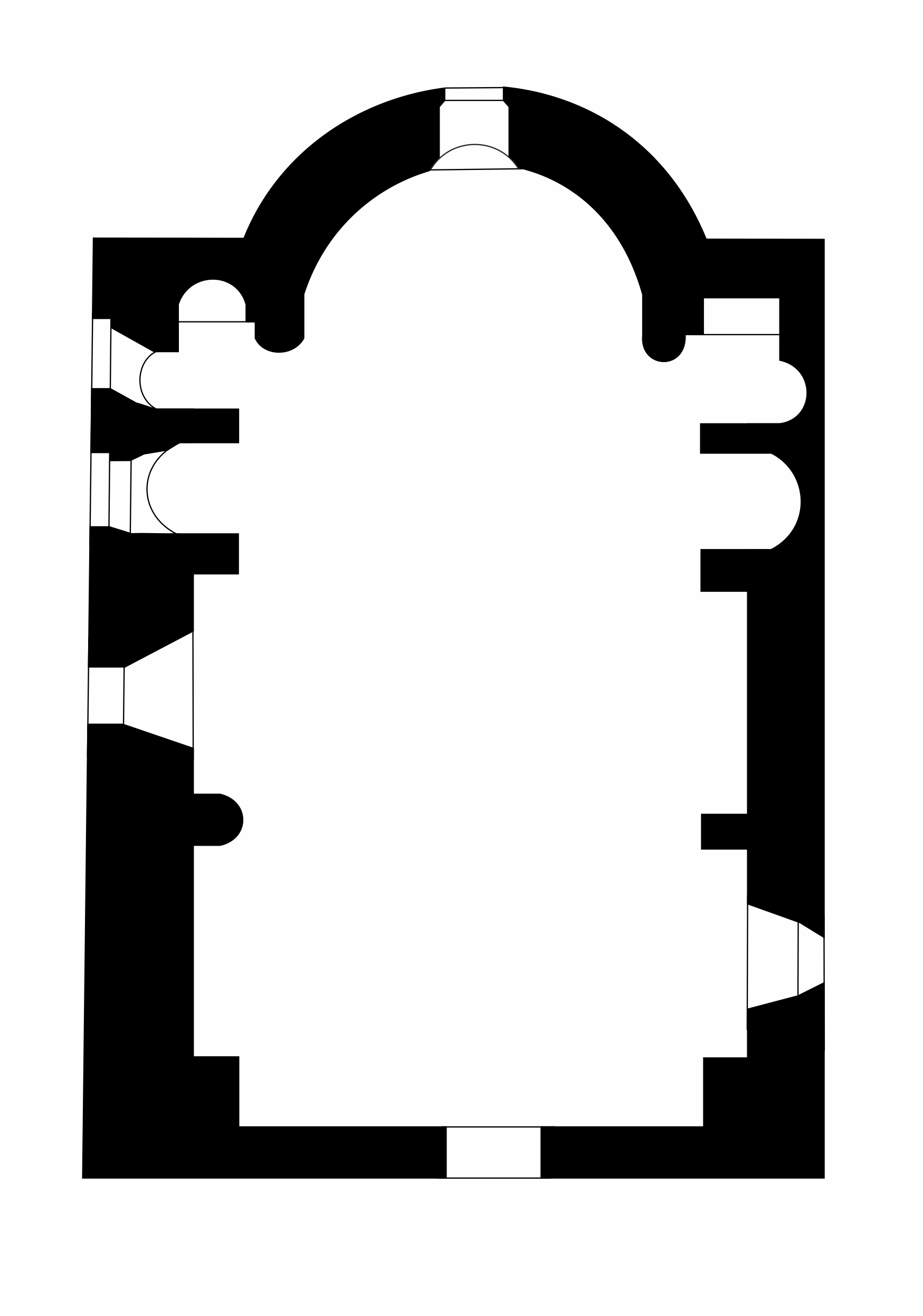
Plan of the church

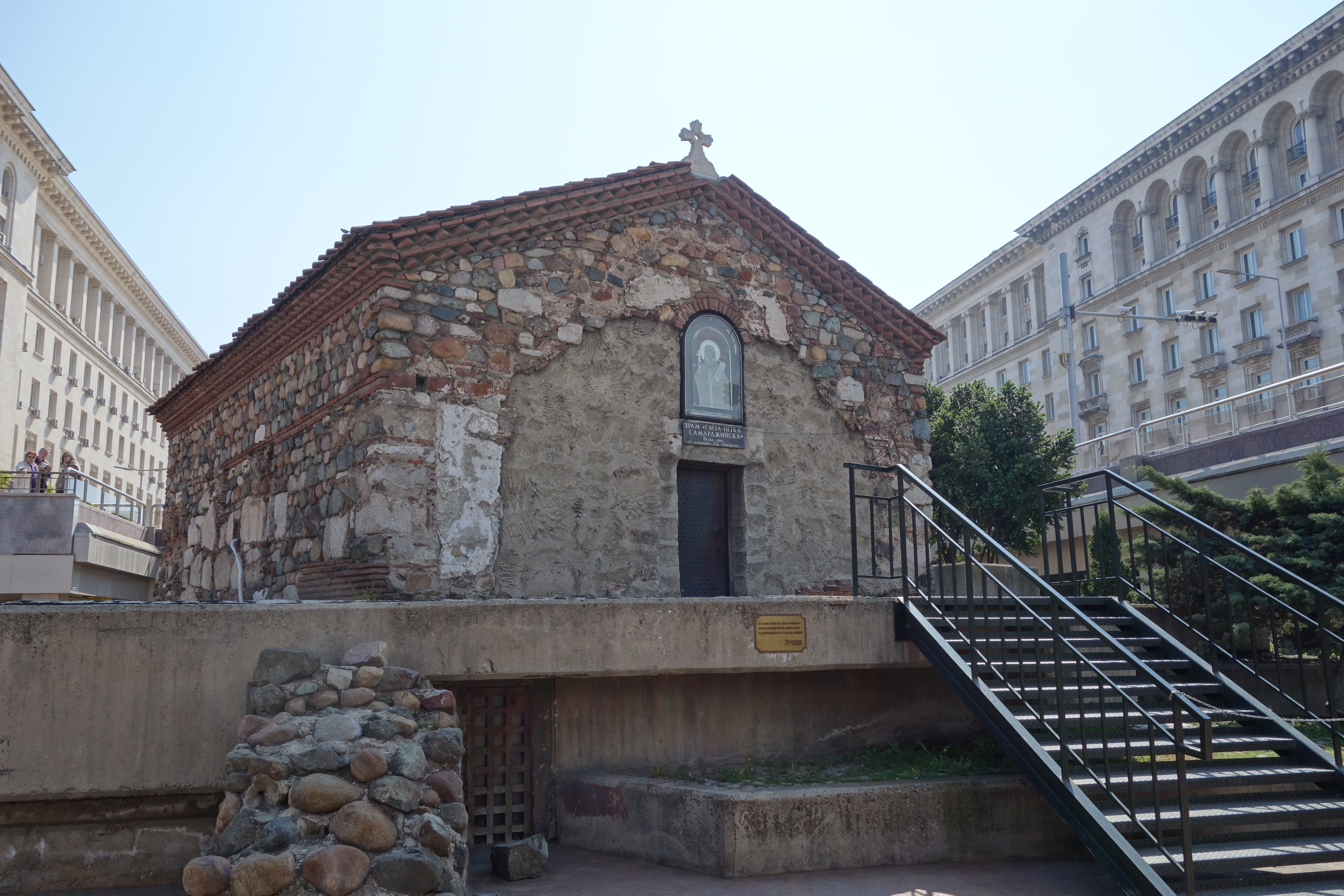
The church in the 14th to 16th centuries

== See also ==
- List of churches in Sofia
- Christianity in Bulgaria
