= Russian Church, Sofia =

Church in Sofia, Bulgaria

Russian Church
- Church of St Nicholas the Miracle-Maker
- Руска църква (църква „Св. Николай Чудотворец“)
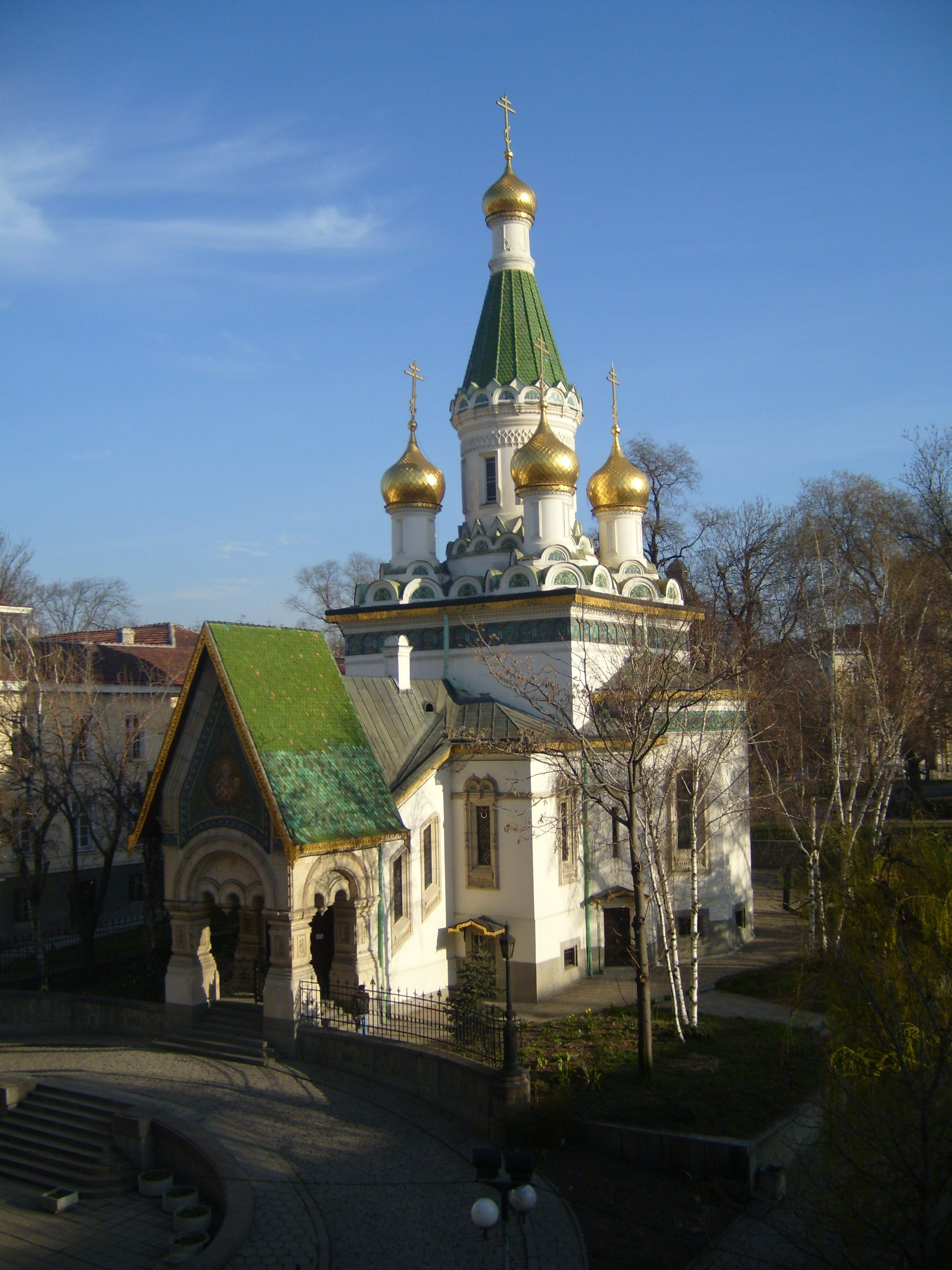
- The church in 2008

- Location of the church in Sofia
- Russian Church
- 42°41′45″N 23°19′45″E
- Location: Tsar Osvoboditel Boulevard, Sofia
- Country: Bulgaria
- Denomination: Russian Orthodox
- Website: podvorie-sofia.bg (in Bulgarian)

History
- Status: Church

Architecture
- Architect: Mikhail Preobrazhenski
- Architectural type: Church
- Style: Russian Revival
- Completed: 1914

The Russian Church (Bulgarian: Руска църква, romanized: Ruska tsarkva), officially known as the Church of St Nicholas the Miracle-Maker (Bulgarian: църква „Св. Николай Чудотворец“, romanized: tsarkva "Sv. Nikolay Chudotvorets"; Russian: Церковь Святителя Николая Чудотворца (София)), is a Russian Orthodox church in central Sofia, Bulgaria situated on Tsar Osvoboditel Boulevard.

== History ==
The Saray Mosque was located on the site. However, the mosque was destroyed in 1882, after the liberation of Bulgaria from the Ottoman Empire.

The church was built as the official church of the Russian Embassy, which was located next door, and of the Russian community in Sofia, and was named, as was the tradition for diplomatic churches, for the patron saint of the Emperor who ruled Russia at the time, Nicholas II of Russia.

== Architecture ==
The church was designed by the Russian architect Mikhail Preobrazhenski in the Russian Revival style, with decoration inspired by the Muscovite Russian churches of the 17th century. The construction was supervised by the architect A. Smirnov, who was building the Saint Alexander Nevsky Cathedral nearby.

The exterior decoration of multicolored tiles was done by G. Kislichev, and the interior murals were painted by a team of artists led by Vasily Perminov, who also painted those in Saint Alexander Nevsky Cathedral. The five domes are coated with gold. The bells were donated by Emperor Nicholas II.

Construction began in 1907 and the church was consecrated in 1914. The church remained open after the Russian Revolution and during the Communist period in Bulgaria (1944–1989), though priests and church-goers were carefully watched by the State Security police.

The exterior was recently restored by the Russian Government. The interior murals were darkened by smoke from candles and from time, and were in need of restoration.

The crypt housing the remains of Saint Archbishop Seraphim is located beneath the Russian Church's main floor. Dozens of people visit the grave of the archbishop, who died in 1950, praying and leaving notes asking for wishes to be granted.

== See also ==
- List of churches in Sofia
- Christianity in Bulgaria
