= Church of St. Nicholas, Sofia =

Bulgarian Orthodox church in Sofia, Bulgaria

Church of Saint Nicholas
- Свети Николай Мирликийски чудотворец
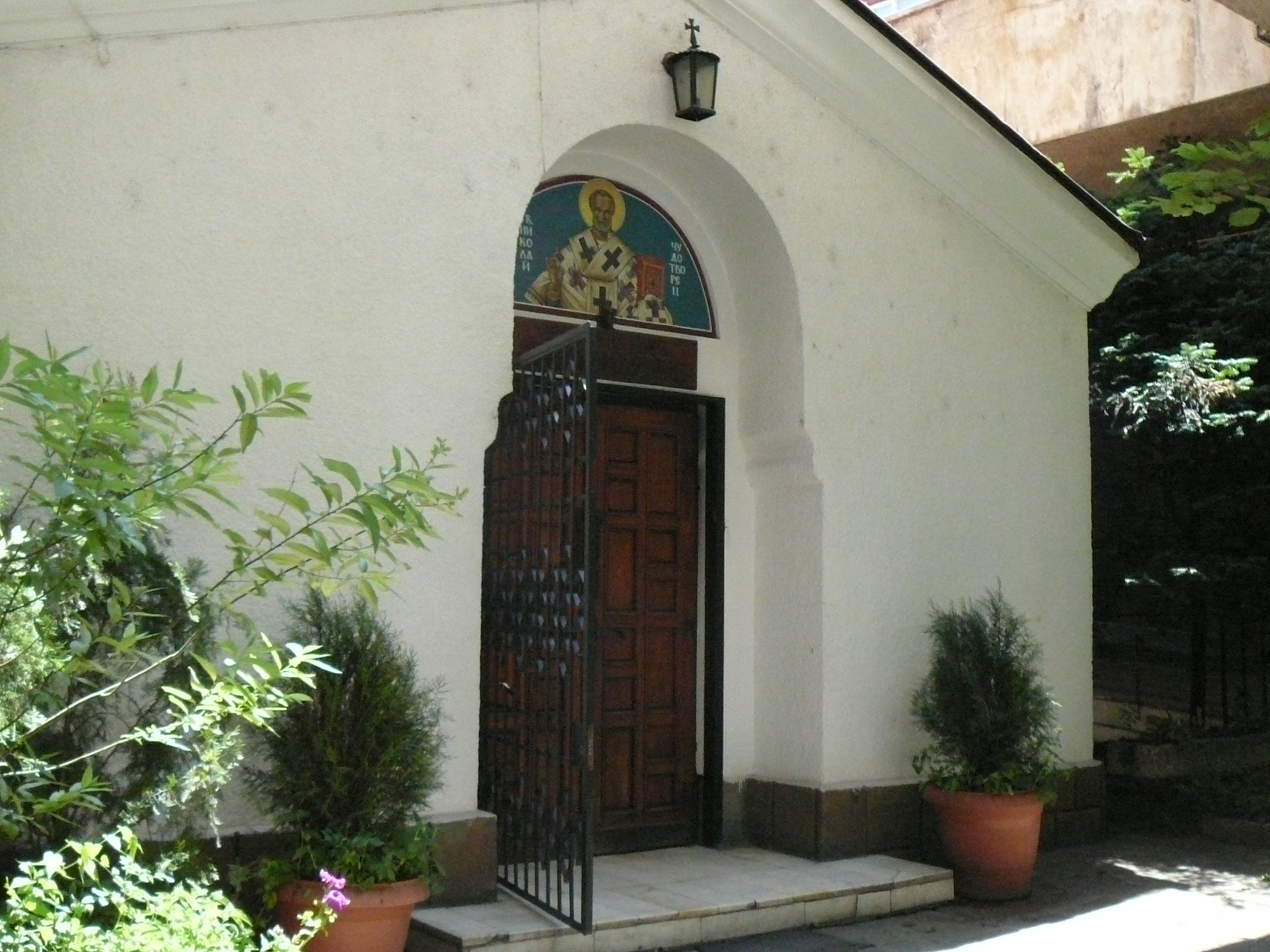
- The church in 2008

- Location of the church in Sofia
- Church of Saint Nicholas
- 42°41′45″N 23°19′22″E
- Location: Sofia
- Country: Bulgaria
- Denomination: Eastern Orthodox
- Tradition: Bulgarian Orthodox

History
- Status: Church
- Founder: Kaloyan

Architecture
- Architectural type: Church
- Completed: 13th century CE

The Church of St. Nicholas (Bulgarian: Свети Николай Мирликийски чудотворец) is an Eastern Orthodox church, located in Sofia, the capital of Bulgaria. The church is affiliated with the Bulgarian Orthodox Church

== Overview ==
The church was built in the 13th century by Kaloyan the sebastocrator as a small family church on today's Kaloyan Street behind the Rila Hotel. It is assumed that the church was erected on the site of the surviving parts of the palace complex that had once stood there which was built during the Roman Empire and accommodated Constantine the Great. Today these parts are preserved and can be seen in the authentic underground walls of the temple.

Each year hundreds of Sofians visit this small chapel to be blessed by the saints. Its feast day is on December 6.

== See also ==
- List of churches in Sofia
- Christianity in Bulgaria
