= Saint Sophia Church, Sofia =

Oldest church in Sofia, Bulgaria

Saint Sofia Church
- църква „Света София“
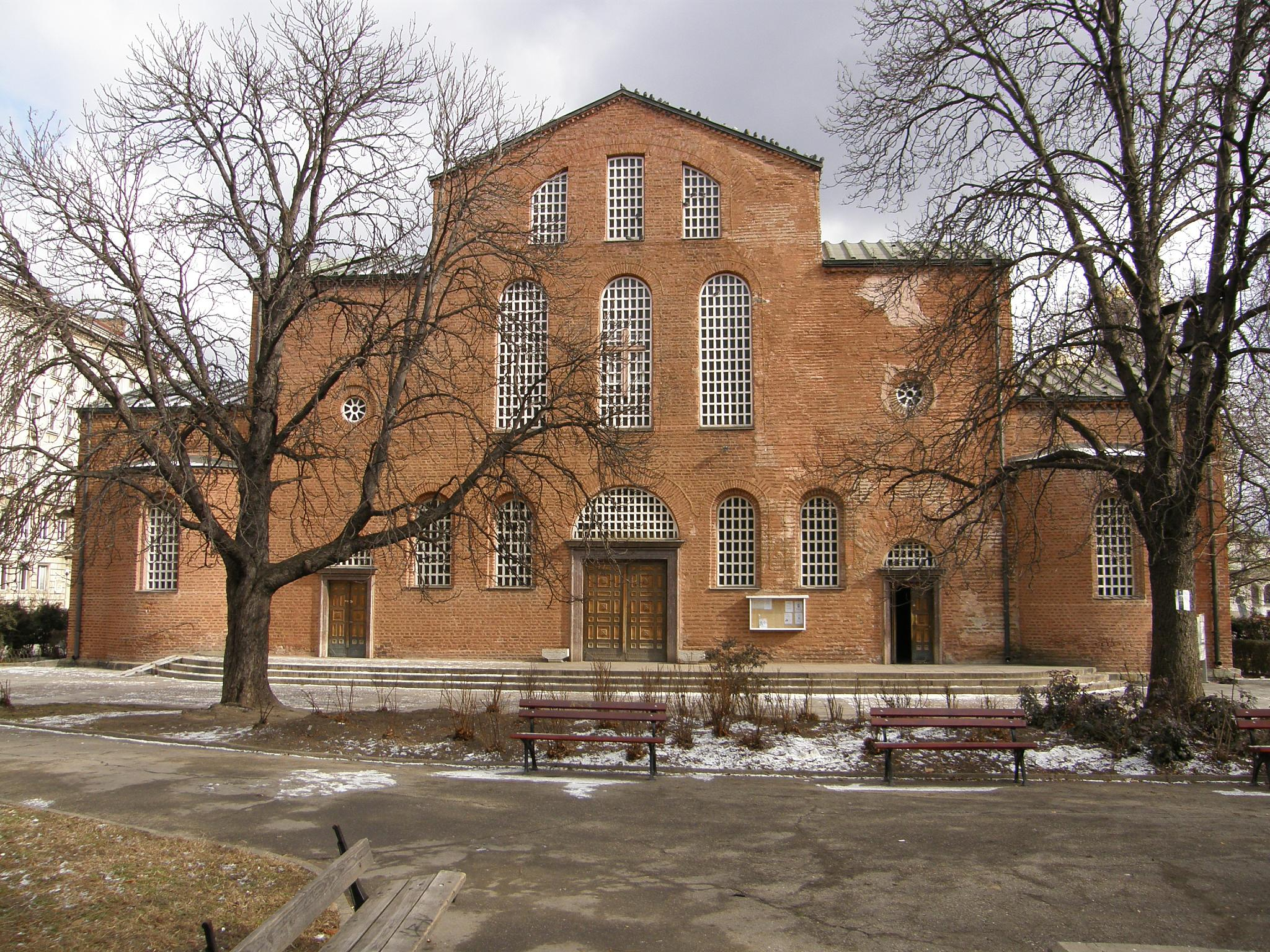

- Location in Sofia
- Saint Sofia Church
- 42°41′47.43″N 23°19′53.13″E
- Location: Sofia
- Country: Bulgaria
- Denomination: Eastern Orthodox
- Previous denomination: Islam (16th–19th century)
- Tradition: Bulgarian Orthodox

History
- Status: Church (c. 4th–6th–16th century); Mosque (16th–19th century); Basilica (since 1935)
- Founded: 4th–6th century
- Founder: Justinian I
- Dedication: Saint Sophia

Architecture
- Functional status: Active
- Architectural type: Church
- Style: Roman; Byzantine
- Completed: 1935 (as a basicila)

Specifications
- Length: 47 m (154 ft)
- Width: 20 m (66 ft)

The Saint Sofia Church (Bulgarian: църква „Света София“, romanized: tsarkva "Sveta Sofia, lit. 'Church of Holy Wisdom') is a Bulgarian Orthodox church, located in Sofia, the capital of Bulgaria. Built as a church in the fourth century CE, the building was converted to a mosque in the 16th century and was restored as a basilica during the 19th and 20th centuries. It is one of the oldest churches in Sofia. In 1329 CE, the town of Serdica was renamed as Sofia, after the church.

== History and architecture ==
The Saint Sofia Church was built on the site of several earlier churches from the fourth century, and places of worship dating from the days when it was the necropolis of the Roman town of Serdica. Serdica was a significant city in the early Christianity, as the place of the Council of Serdica around 343 CE, attended by 316 bishops. In the second century, it was the location of a Roman theatre. Other churches were built and destroyed during conflicts with Goths, Huns and others for the next few centuries. As a contemporary structure of the Hagia Sophia church in Constantinople, the Saint Sofia Church, with the cross design of its current basilica, two towers and one tower-cupola, is believed to have been built during the reign of Byzantine Emperor Justinian I (527–565 CE).

The Saint Sofia Church (often abbreviated as St. Sophia) came under control of a metropolitan bishop in the Second Bulgarian Empire (12th to 14th centuries). Notably, the capital of the country Sofia was named after the church in the 14th century. The 12th-century frescoes were destroyed, replaced with minarets, and the church was converted to a mosque in the 16th century during Ottoman Bulgaria. The mosque was abandoned in the 19th century, because two earthquakes destroyed one of the minarets. Restoration of the basilica began about 1926 by Bogdan Filov and was completed about 1935.

The Saint Sofia Church is now one of the most valuable pieces of Early Christian architecture in south-eastern Europe. The present building is a cross basilica with three altars. The floor of the church is covered with complex Early Christian ornamental or flora and fauna-themed mosaics. The Saint Sofia Church stands in the middle of an ancient necropolis and many tombs have been unearthed both under and near the church. Some of the tombs feature frescoes.

Because Saint Sophia represents Holy Wisdom, icons within the church depict Sophia as Christ Emmanuel, a young figure of Christ seated on a rainbow. The church also displays icons of historical saints, including St. George and St. Vladimir.

== Gallery ==
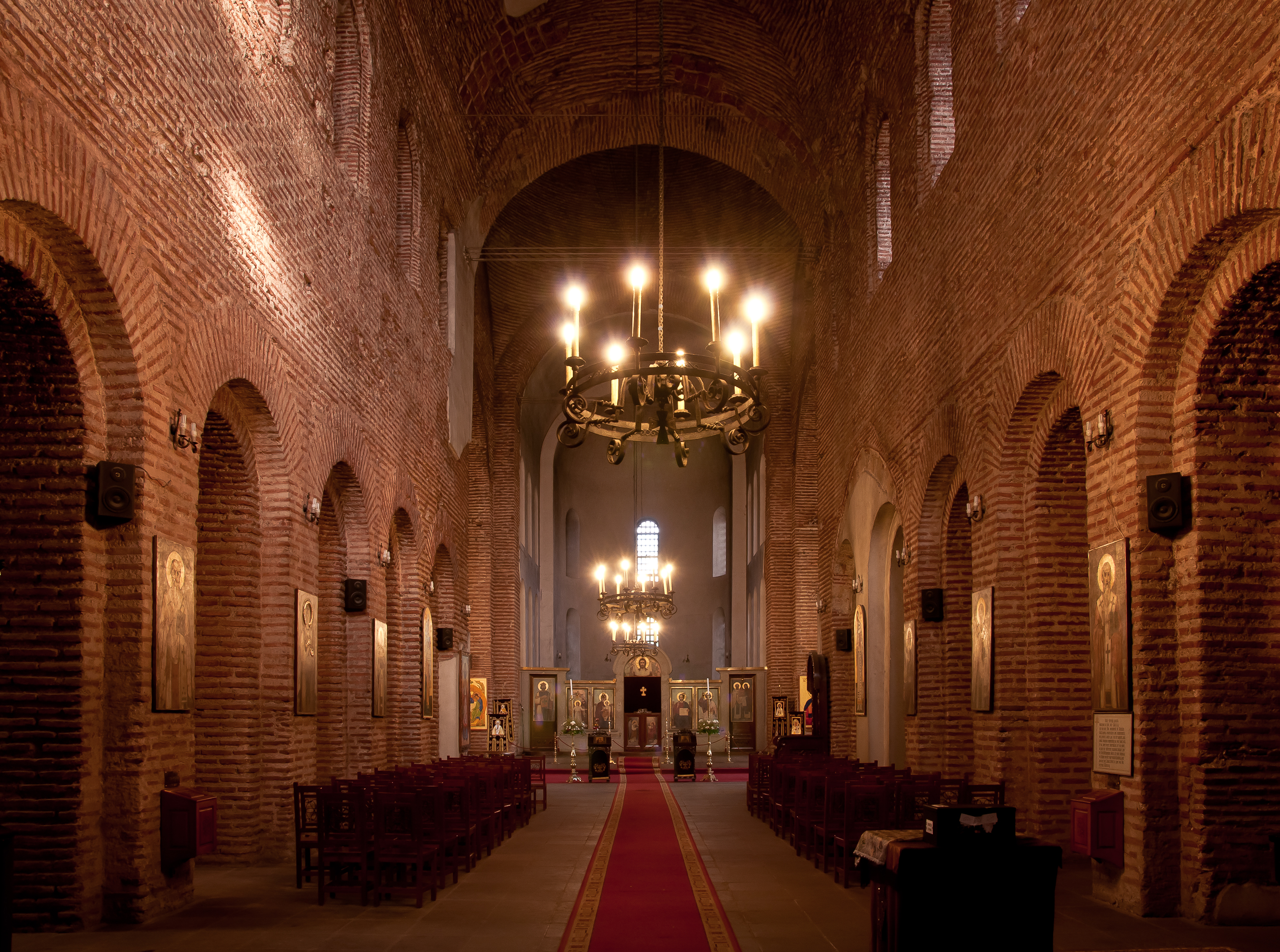
Nave

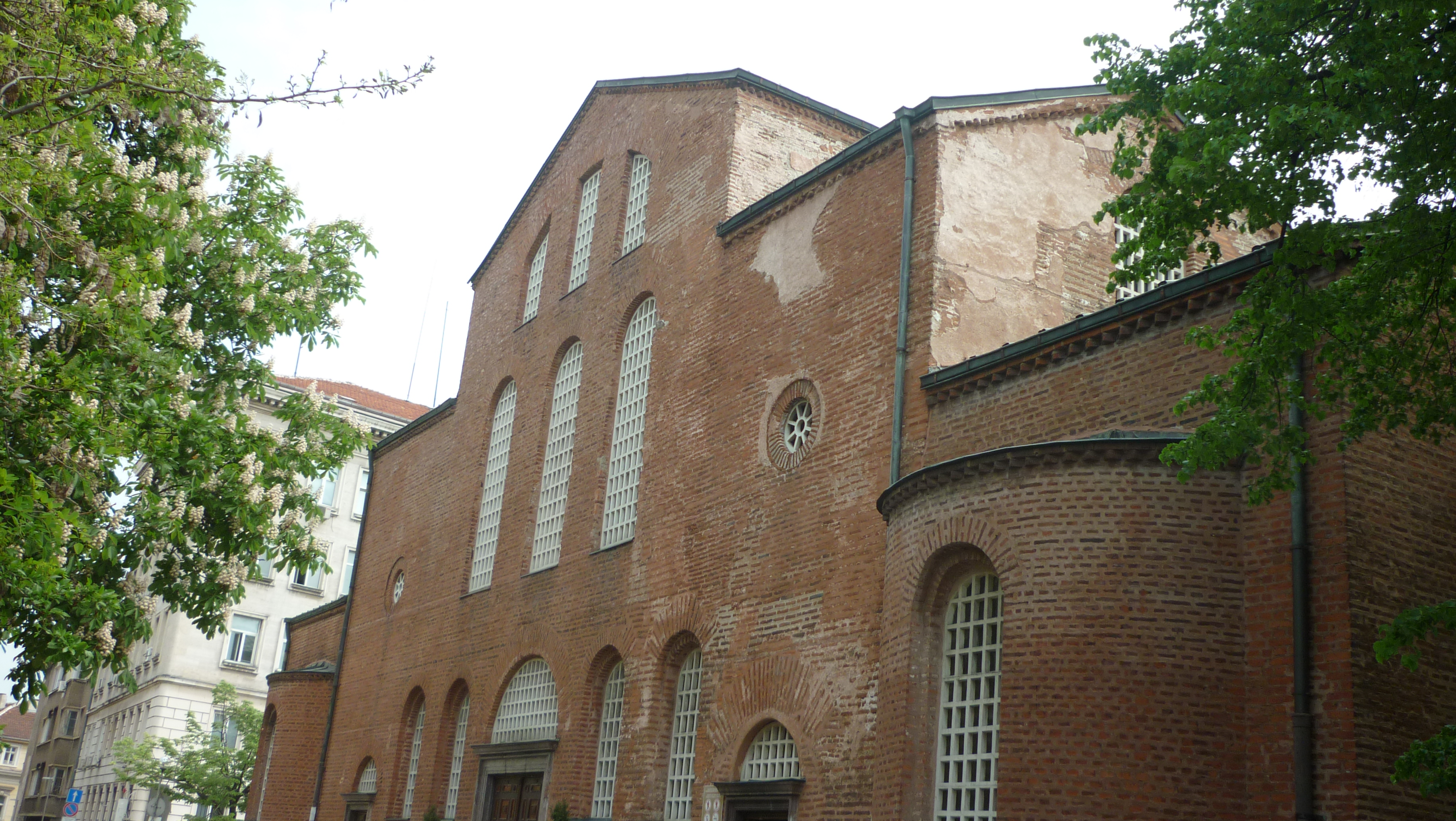

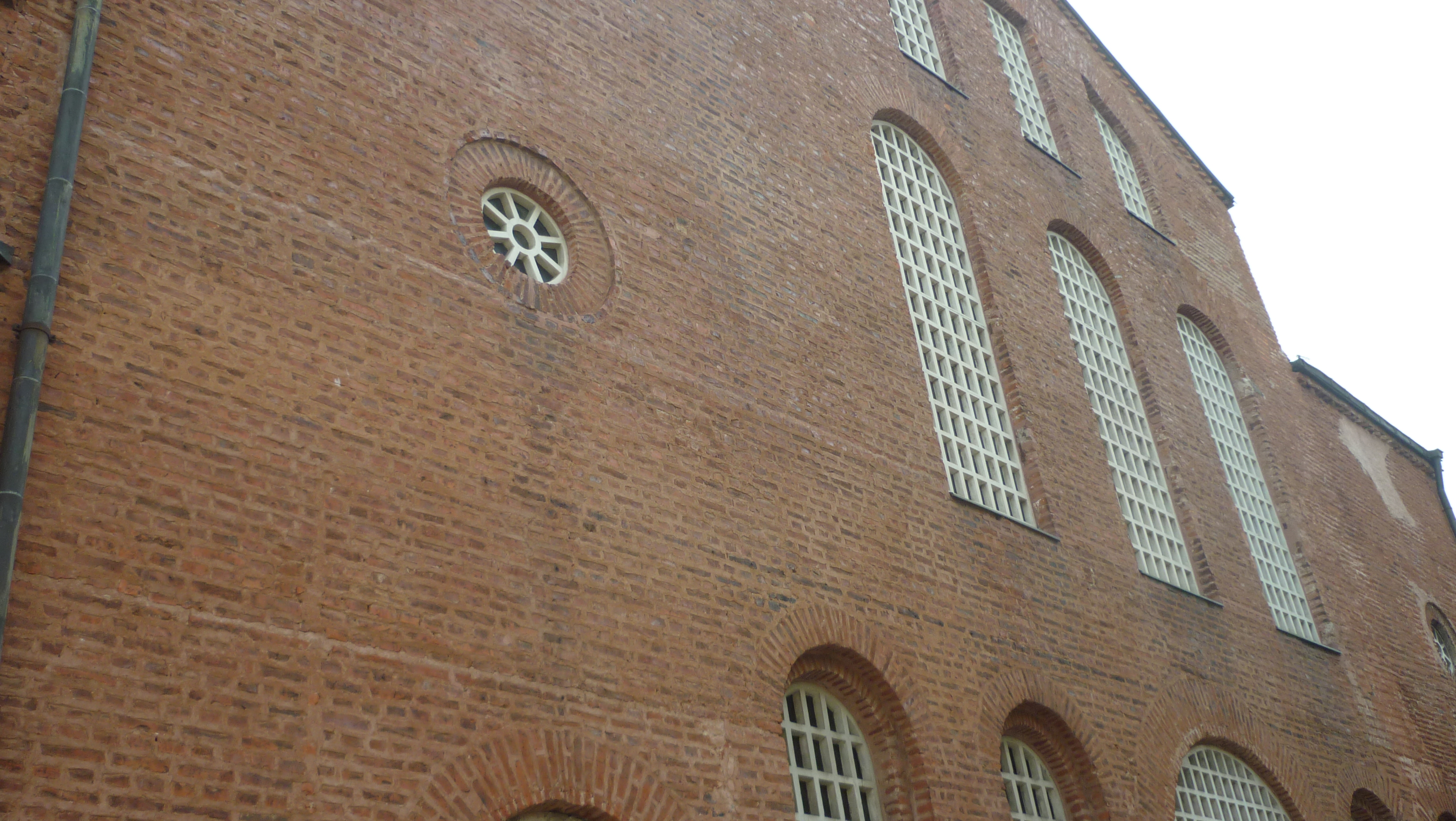

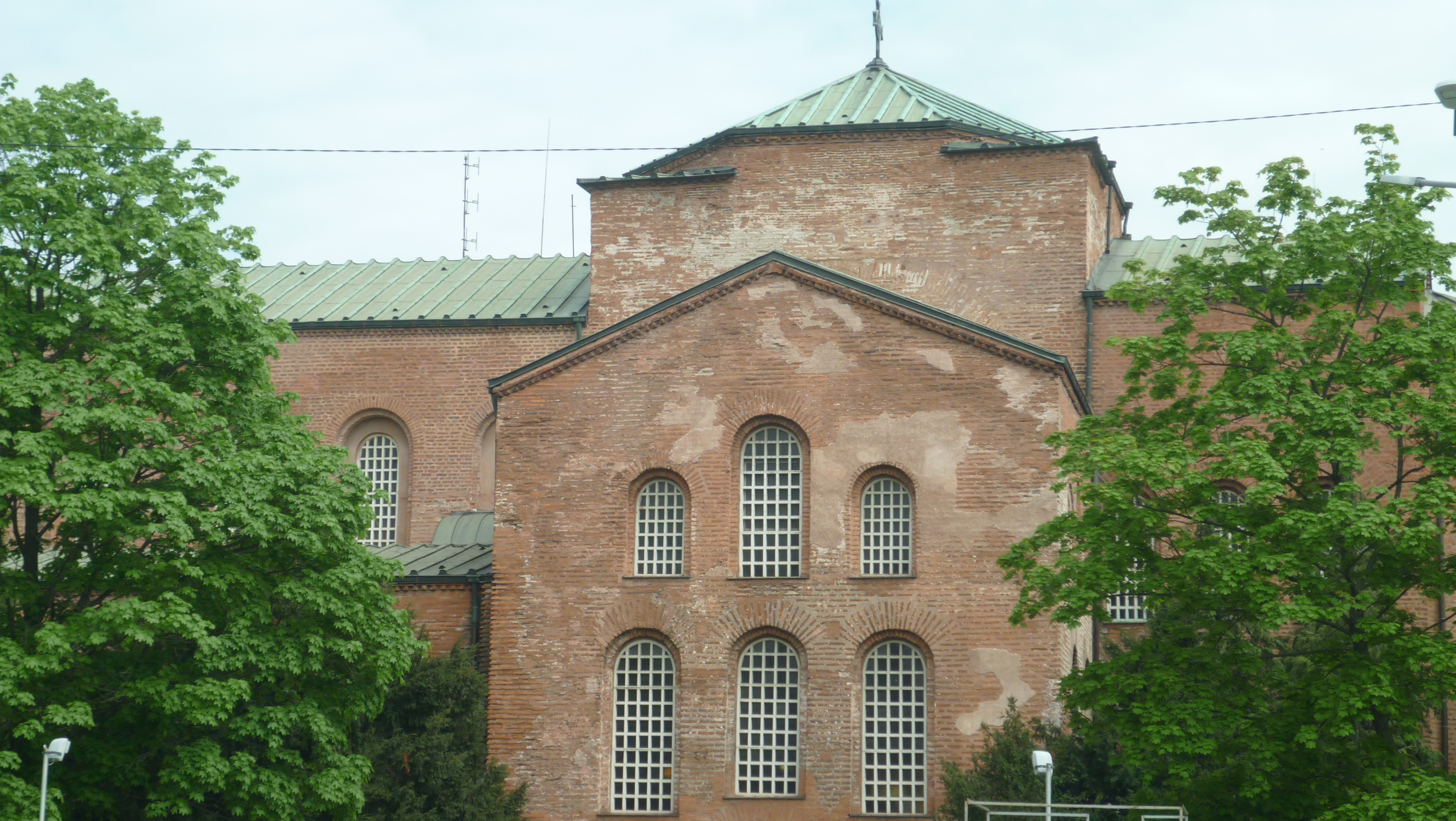

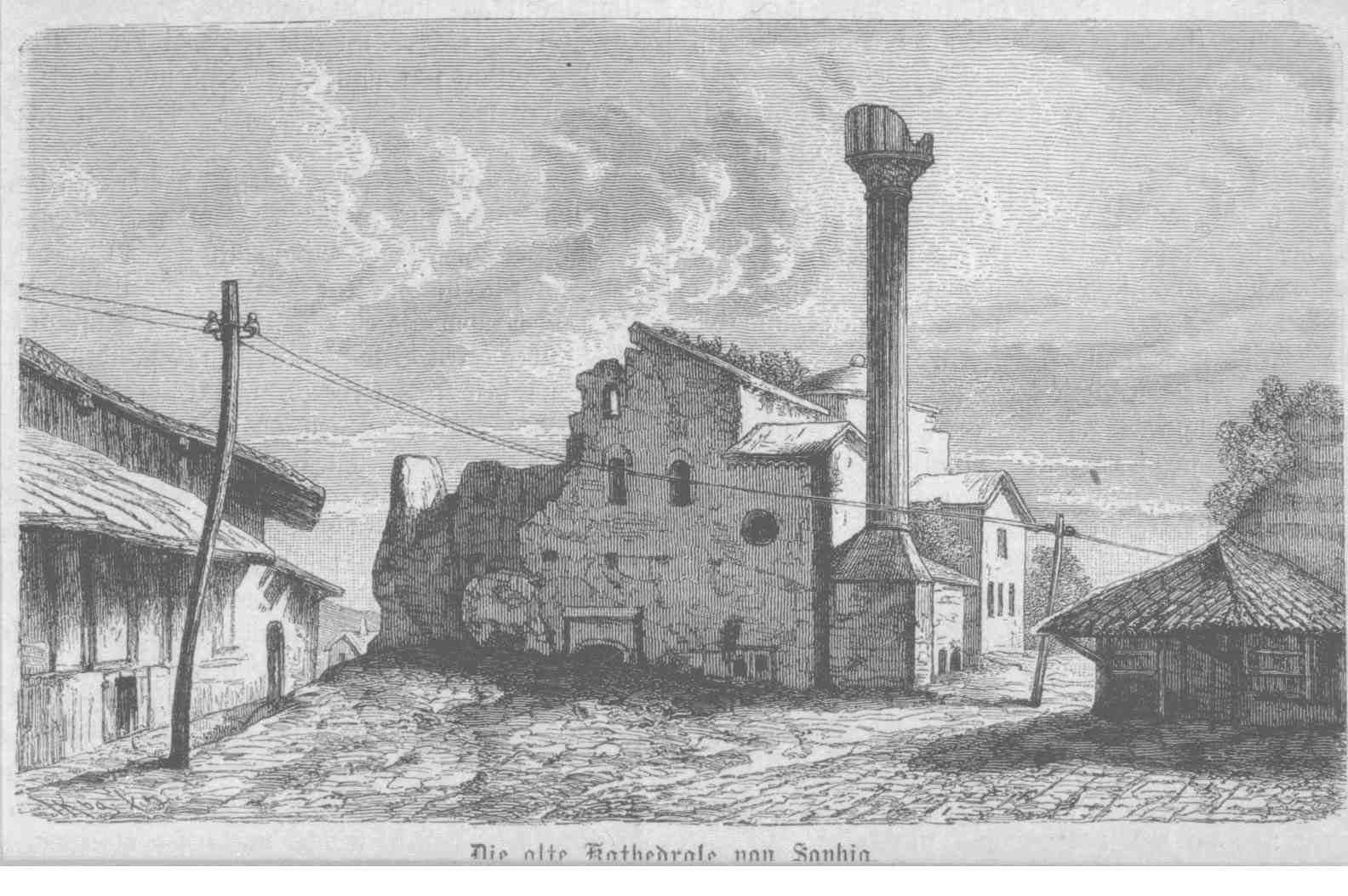
Façade view in 1878

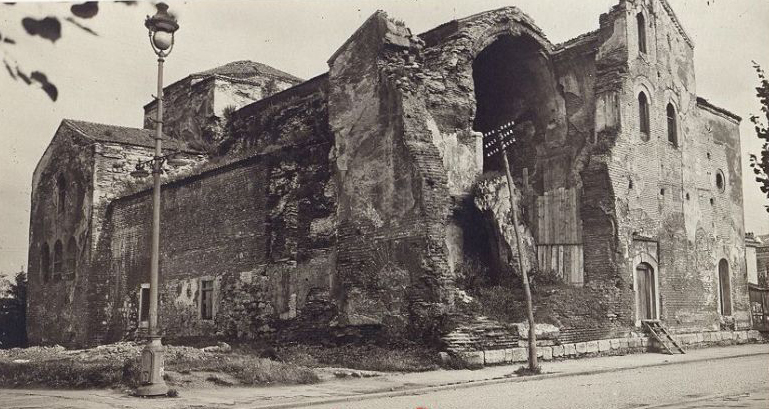
View of the church c. 1915

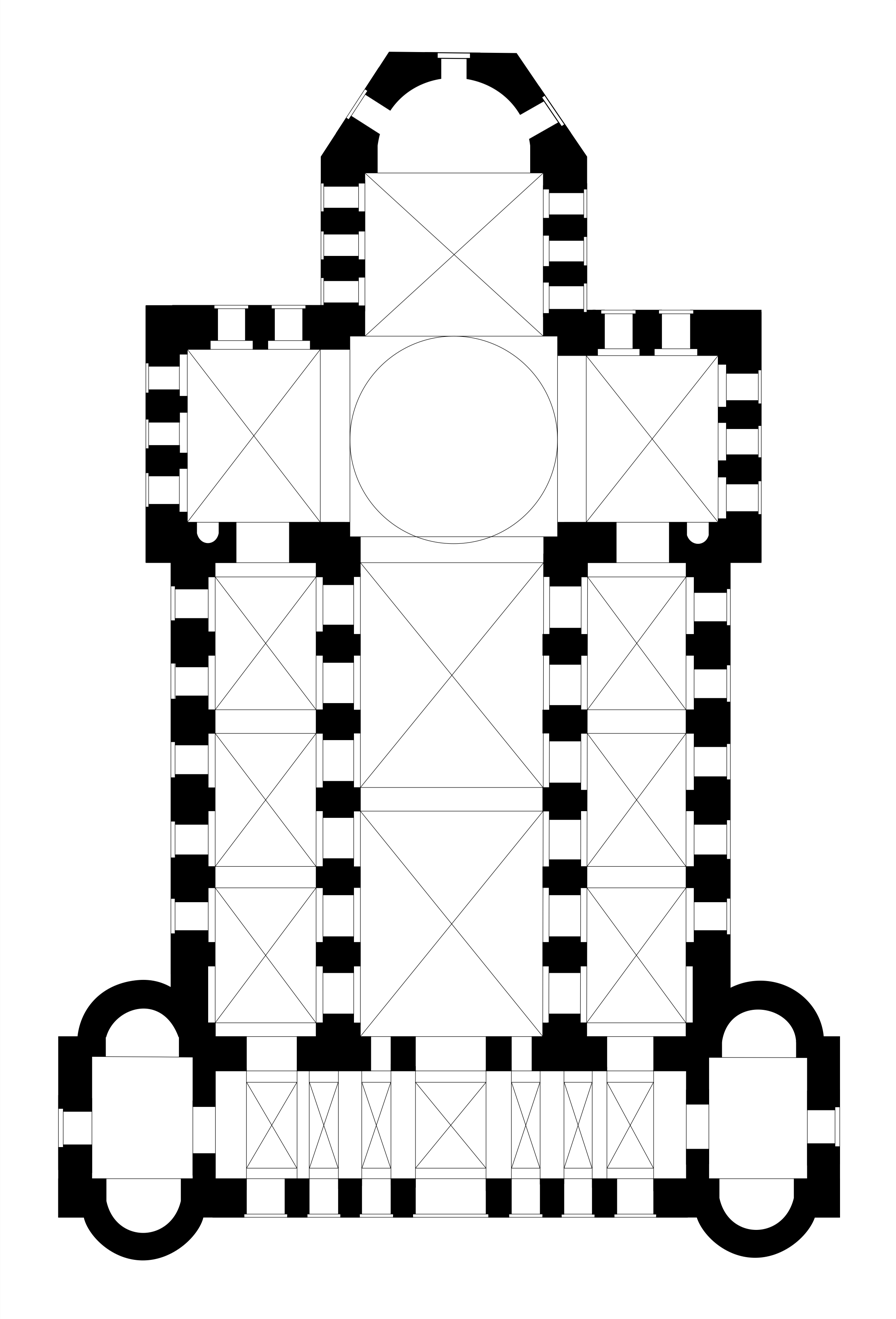
Plan of the church

== See also ==
- Christianity in Bulgaria
- List of churches in Sofia
- Ancient Roman and Byzantine domes
