= Seven Saints Church, Sofia =

Bulgarian Orthodox church in Sofia, Bulgaria

Sveti Sedmochislenitsi Church
- Seven Saints Church, Sofia
- църква „Свети Седмочисленици“
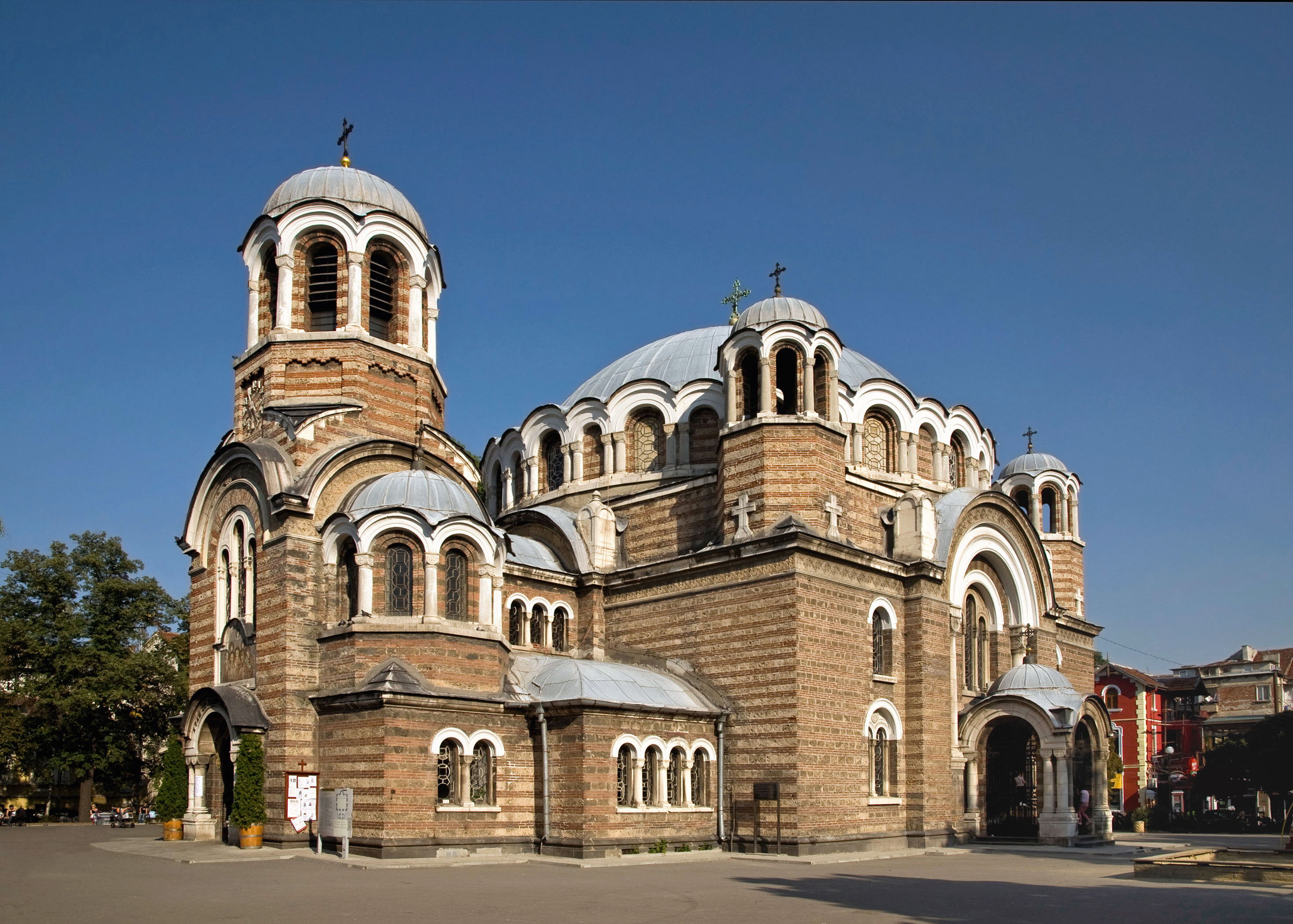
- The Sveti Sedmochislenitsi Church

- Location of the church in Sofia
- 42°41′23″N 23°19′40″E
- Address: 25, Graf Ignatiev str, Sofia
- Country: Bulgaria
- Denomination: Eastern Orthodox
- Previous denomination: Islam
- Tradition: Bulgarian Orthodox
- Website: svsedmochislenitsi.com (in Bulgarian)

History
- Former names: Black Mosque; (Черна джамия); (Kara Camii)
- Status: Church (since 1903–); Mosque (1547–1878)
- Founded: 1547 (as a mosque)
- Founder: Suleiman the Magnificent
- Dedication: Sedmochislenitsi
- Consecrated: 27 July 1903

Architecture
- Architects: Mimar Sinan (1547); Alexander Pomerantsev, Yordan Milanov, Petko Momchilov (1902)
- Architectural type: Mosque; Church
- Style: Ottoman; Neo-romanticism; Neo-Byzantine

Specifications
- Length: 25 m (82 ft)
- Materials: Granite

Administration
- Province: Patriarchate of Bulgaria
- Diocese: Eparchy of Sofia (Софийска епархия)

Clergy
- Priest: Fr. Nicholas Kotsev

The Sveti Sedmochislenitsi Church (Bulgarian: църква „Свети Седмочисленици“, lit. 'Seven Apostles of Bulgarian Orthodox Church') and formerly the Black Mosque (Turkish: Kara Camii) is a Bulgarian Orthodox church, located in Sofia, the capital of Bulgaria. It was established in 1547 as an Ottoman mosque, later converted into an Eastern Orthodox church, and was inaugurated on 27 July 1903. The church is dedicated in honour of Cyril and Methodius and their five disciples, known collectively in Eastern Orthodoxy as the Sedmochislenitsi.

== History ==
=== As a mosque ===
The Black Mosque (Bulgarian: Черна джамия, romanized: Cherna dzhamiya; Turkish: Kara Camii) was completed in c. 1547. The mosque was commissioned by Sofu Mehmed Pasha, former governor-general of Rumelia, to Mimar Sinan. By the time of the inauguration of the mosque, Sofu Mehmed Pasha had risen to the rank of vizier, to Suleiman the Magnificent. The mosque was constructed on the site of a former nunnery of the Rila Monastery and an early Christian temple from the 4th-5th century, the ruins of which were excavated in 1901. An even older construction, a pagan temple of Asclepius from Roman Serdica, was also discovered in the mosque's foundations.

The mosque received its more popular name, the Black Mosque, after the dark granite from which its minaret was made. The minaret collapsed during an earthquake in the 19th century and the mosque was abandoned by the Ottomans after the Liberation of Bulgaria in 1878 and was subsequently used for profane purposes as a military warehouse and prison.

=== As a church ===
The Russian architect Alexander Pomerantsev, responsible for the Upper Trade Rows on Red Square, among other buildings, suggested the conversion of the former mosque into a Christian church. Yordan Milanov and Petko Momchilov, Bulgarian architects, designed the dome, the narthex and the bell tower in a traditional Bulgarian Neo-Byzantine style, inspired by the Neo-romantic movement. Only the central hall and the dome of the former mosque were preserved, with four oval bays, a narthex and an altar section being added.

The construction took a year, between 27 May 1901 and 6 May 1902, and the complete inner decoration did not finish until 1996. Young artists painted the icons and among the first donors were Tsar Ferdinand (recognized as the primary church donor in 1905) and Ivan Evstratiev Geshov. Famous Bulgarian statesman Petko Karavelov also contributed significantly to the church's construction and was buried nearby in January 1903.

== Architecture ==
The 25-metre-long (82 ft) mosque had a square shape and a large lead-covered dome. The mosque was also known as the İmaret Mosque after the imaret, a kitchen for the poor located in the vicinity, the ruins of which were found in 1912. A madrasah, a Muslim religious school, was located in what is now the small garden between the modern church and the Count Ignatiev School. The madrasah was later used as a prison after the Liberation of Bulgaria. Other Ottoman constructions nearby included a caravanserai and a hammam.

The large candlesticks in front of the altar were cast in 1903 from obsolete police badges from Eastern Rumelia and the Principality of Bulgaria (i.e. before the Unification in 1885). An electric clock, still in use, was created by the noted watchmaker Georgi Hadzhinikolov and fit to the western façade in the 1930s. The small garden and the square close to the church were also built in the period.

== Notable burials ==
- Petko Stoichev Karavelov (Петко Каравелов) (24 March 1843 – 24 January 1903), a leading Bulgarian liberal politician, who served as prime minister on four occasions; and his wife.

== Gallery ==
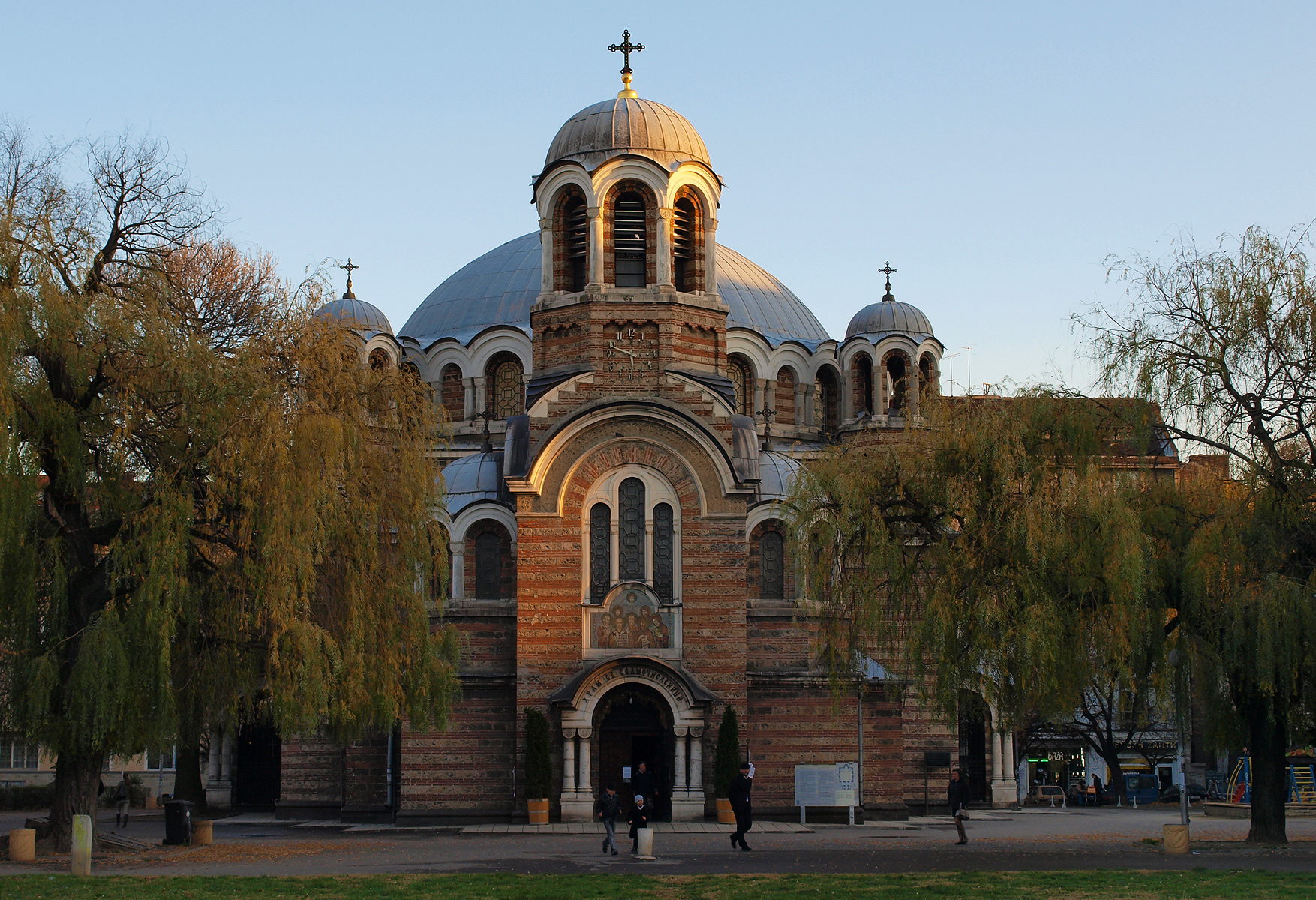
The main approach to the church

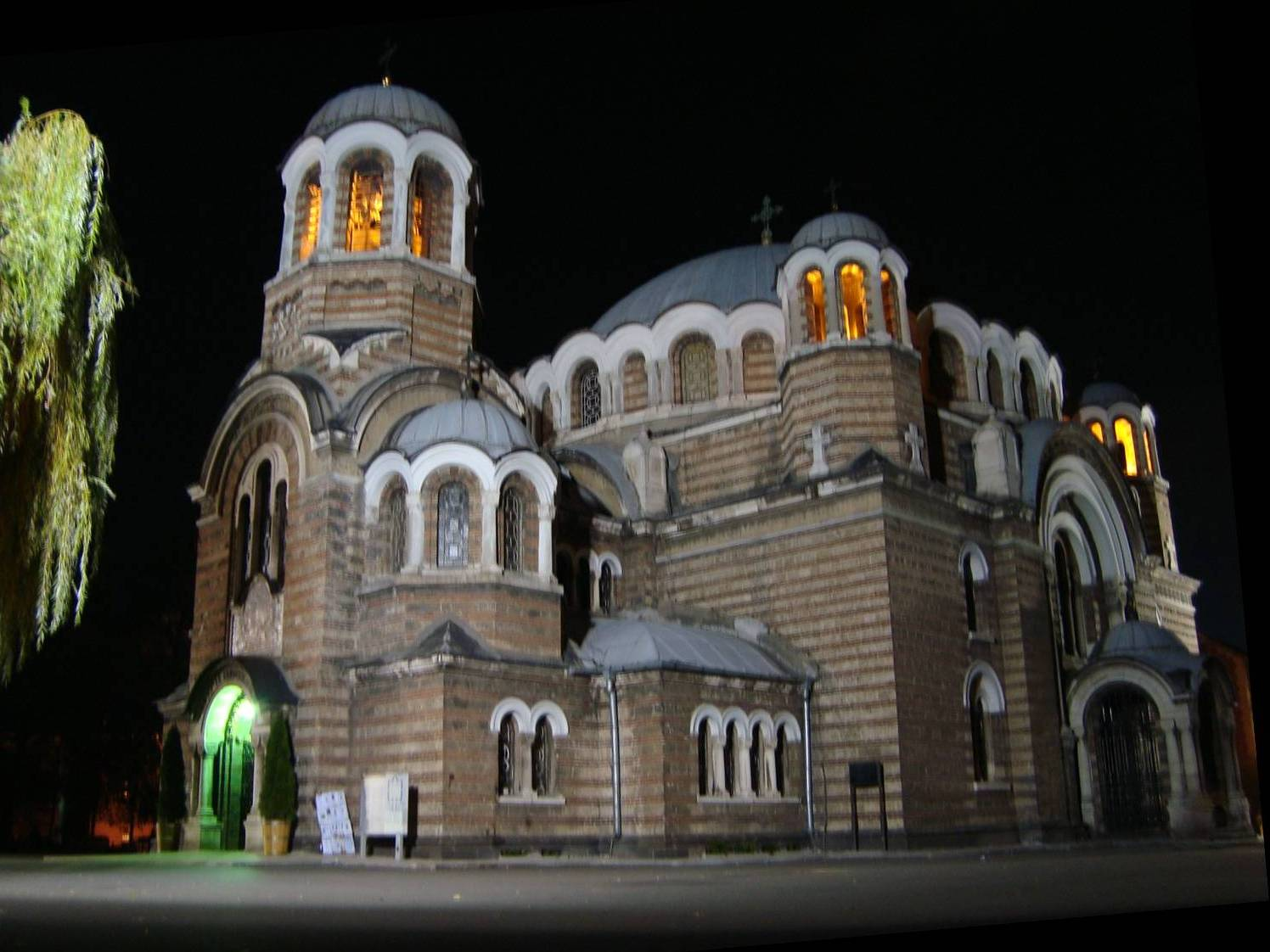
The church at night

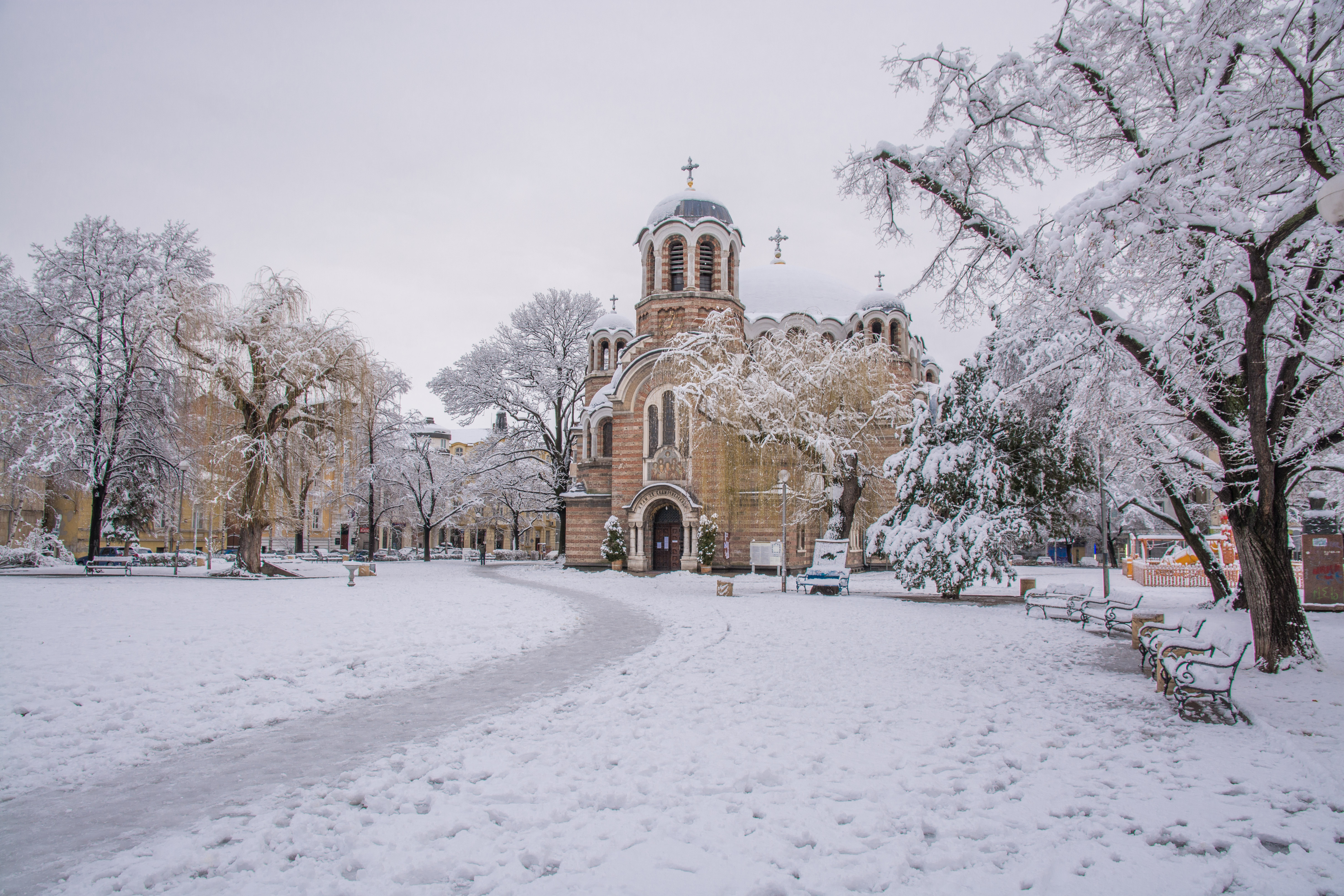
The church in winter

== See also ==
- List of churches in Sofia
- Religion in Bulgaria
- Seven Apostles of Bulgaria
