= Meyers Reisebücher =

German-language travel guide books published between 1862 and 1936

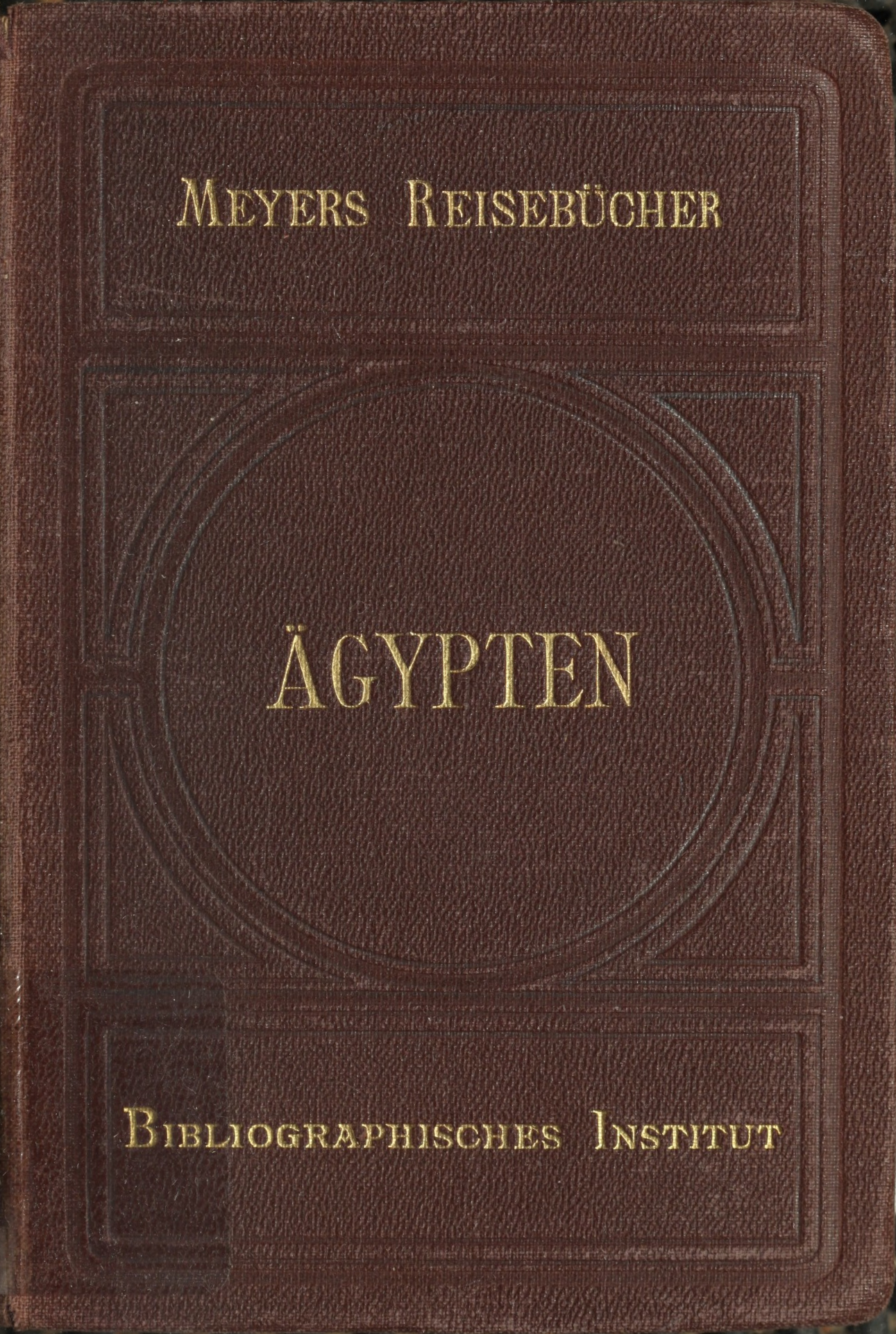
Ägypten, 1909

Meyers Reisebücher (1862-1936) were a series of German-language travel guide books published by the Bibliographisches Institut of Hildburghausen and Leipzig.

== List of Meyers Reisebücher by geographic coverage ==
=== Austria ===
- Österreich-Ungarn, Bosnien und Herzegowina
- Wien ... und auf den besuchtesten Routen durch Österreich-Ungarn [Vienna ... and parts of Austria-Hungary], Meyers Reisebücher (in German), Hildburghausen: Bibliographisches Institut, 1873 + index

=== British Isles ===
- Reisehandbuch für London, England und Schottland [Travel Handbook for London, England and Scotland], Meyers Reisebücher (in German), Hildburghausen: Bibliographisches Institut, 1870

=== Egypt ===
- Ägypten, Palästina, Syrien. 1888.
- Ägypten [Egypt], Meyers Reisebücher (in German) (5th ed.), Leipzig: Bibliographisches Institut, 1909, OL 19683026M

=== France ===
- Paris und Nord-Frankreich
- Süd-Frankreich und Seich Kurorte [South of France and its Spas], Meyers Reisebücher (in German), Hildburghausen: Bibliographisches Institut, 1869
- Gsell-Fels, Theodor (1907). Riviera, Südfrankreich, Korsika, Algerien und Tunis.

=== Germany ===
- Bayerischer und Böhmerwald
- Berlin
- Dresden, Sächsische Schweiz
- Erzgebirge
- Franken und Nürnberg
- Harz
- Der Hochtourist in den Ostalpen
- Nord-Deutschland
- Oberbayern und München
- Riesengebirge
- Rheinlande
- Rhein
- Schwarzwald
- Süd-Deutschland
- Thüringen
- Deutsche Alpen
- Thüringen und Frankenwald, Meyers Reisebücher (in German) (16th ed.), Leipzig: Bibliographisches Institut, 1902

=== Greece ===
- Griechenland und Kleinasien [Greece and Asia Minor], Meyers Reisebücher (in German) (5th ed.), Leipzig: Bibliographisches Institut, 1901 + index

=== Italy ===
- Rom und Mittel-Italien [Rome and Central Italy], Meyers Reisebücher (in German), Hildburghausen: Bibliographisches Institut, 1872
- Ober-Italien [Northern Italy], Meyers Reisebücher (in German) (4th ed.), Leipzig: Bibliographisches Institut, 1884 + Index
  - 1892 ed. + Index
- Unter-Italien und Sizilien [Southern Italy and Sicily], Meyers Reisebücher (in German) (3rd ed.), Leipzig: Bibliographisches Institut, 1889

=== Scandinavia ===
- Norwegen, Schweden und Dänemark [Norway, Sweden, and Denmark], Meyers Reisebücher (in German) (10th ed.), Leipzig: Bibliographisches Institut, 1911

=== Switzerland ===
- Schweiz [Switzerland], Meyers Reisebücher (in German) (14th ed.), Leipzig: Bibliographisches Institut, 1897

=== Syria ===
- Ägypten, Palästina, Syrien. 1888.
- Palästina und Syrien [Palestine and Syria], Meyers Reisebücher (in German) (4th ed.), Leipzig: Bibliographisches Institut, 1904 + index

=== Turkey ===
- Balkanstaaten und Konstantinopel
- Reisebücher, Meyers (1892). Türkei und Griechenland (4th ed.). + index
- Türkei, Rumänien, Serbien, Bulgarien [Turkey, Romania, Serbia, Bulgaria], Meyers Reisebücher (in German) (6th ed.), Leipzig: Bibliographisches Institut, 1902 + index

== List of Meyers Reisebücher by date of publication ==
=== 1860s-1870s ===
- Süd-Frankreich und Seich Kurorte [South of France and its Spas], Meyers Reisebücher (in German), Hildburghausen: Bibliographisches Institut, 1869
- Reisehandbuch für London, England und Schottland [Travel Handbook for London, England and Scotland], Meyers Reisebücher (in German), Hildburghausen: Bibliographisches Institut, 1870
- Rom und Mittel-Italien [Rome and Central Italy], Meyers Reisebücher (in German), Hildburghausen: Bibliographisches Institut, 1872

=== 1880s-1890s ===
- Ober-Italien [Northern Italy], Meyers Reisebücher (in German) (4th ed.), Leipzig: Bibliographisches Institut, 1884
- Unter-Italien und Sizilien [Southern Italy and Sicily], Meyers Reisebücher (in German) (3rd ed.), Leipzig: Bibliographisches Institut, 1889
- Schweiz [Switzerland], Meyers Reisebücher (in German) (14th ed.), Leipzig: Bibliographisches Institut, 1897
- Ostseebäder und Städte der Ostseeküste. 1899. OCLC 805234725.

=== 1900s-1910s ===
- Griechenland und Kleinasien [Greece and Asia Minor], Meyers Reisebücher (in German) (5th ed.), Leipzig: Bibliographisches Institut, 1901 + index
- Nordseebäder und Städte der Nordseeküste. 1901. OCLC 64415684.
- Thüringen und Frankenwald, Meyers Reisebücher (in German) (16th ed.), Leipzig: Bibliographisches Institut, 1902
- Türkei, Rumänien, Serbien, Bulgarien [Turkey, Romania, Serbia, Bulgaria], Meyers Reisebücher (in German) (6th ed.), Leipzig: Bibliographisches Institut, 1902
- Palästina und Syrien [Palestine and Syria], Meyers Reisebücher (in German) (4th ed.), Leipzig: Bibliographisches Institut, 1904
- Ägypten [Egypt], Meyers Reisebücher (in German) (5th ed.), Leipzig: Bibliographisches Institut, 1909, OL 19683026M
- Norwegen, Schweden und Dänemark [Norway, Sweden, and Denmark], Meyers Reisebücher (in German) (10th ed.), Leipzig: Bibliographisches Institut, 1911
