= History of Sofia =

The history of Sofia, Bulgaria's capital and largest city, spans thousands of years from Antiquity to modern times, during which the city has been a commercial, industrial, cultural and economic centre in its region and the Balkans.

== Antiquity ==
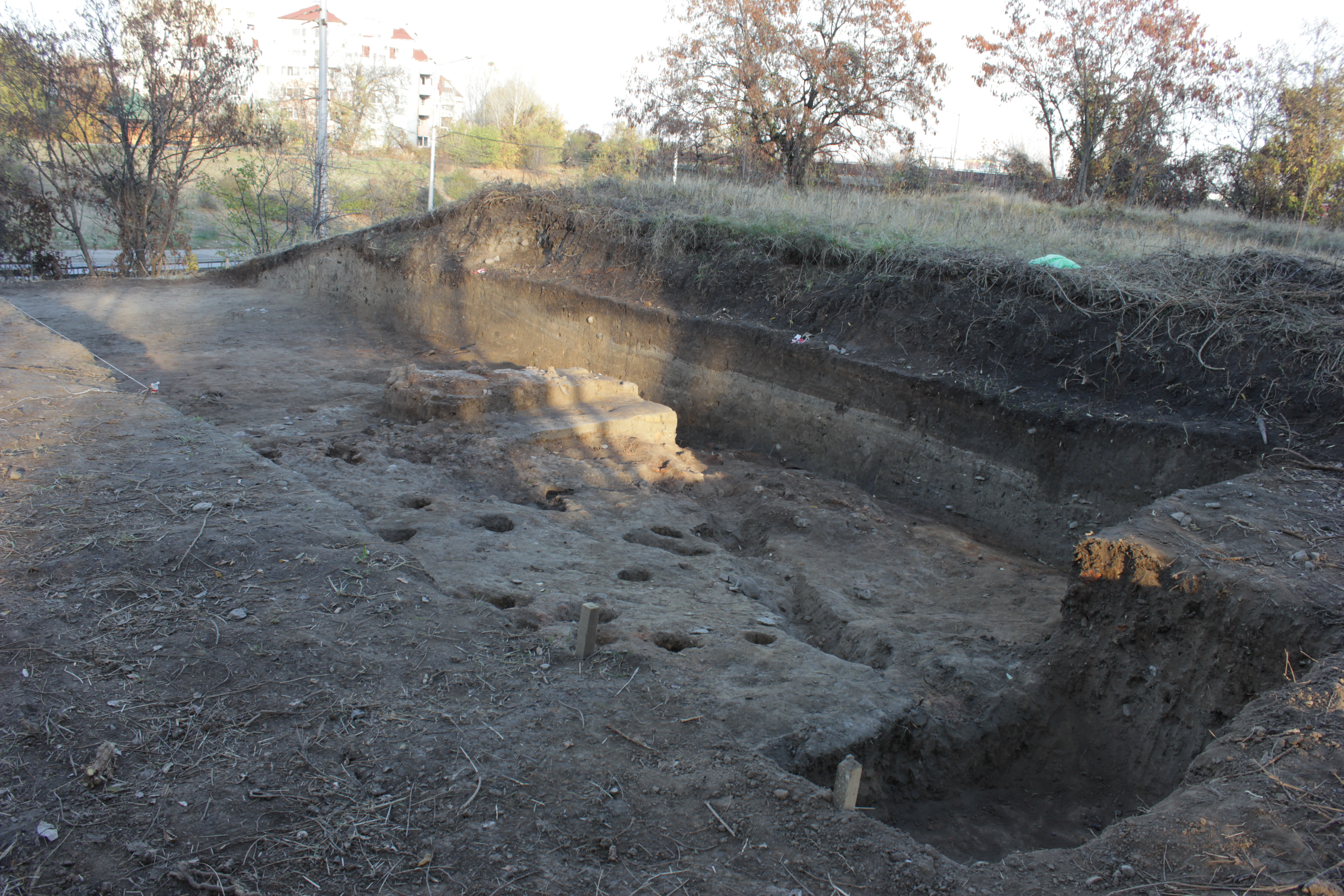
Slatina Neolithic settlement from the 6th millennium BC

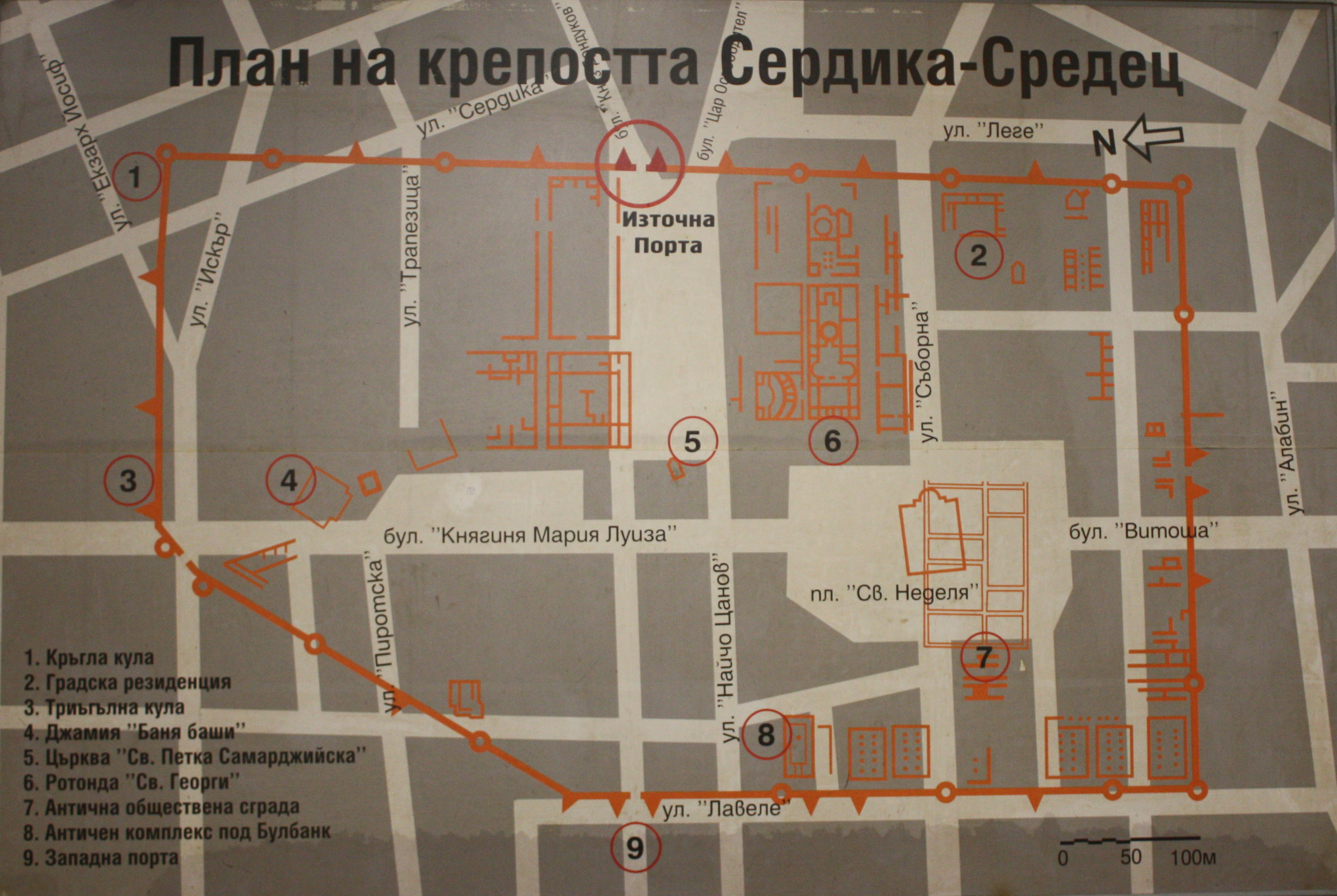
Roman city plan and archaeology

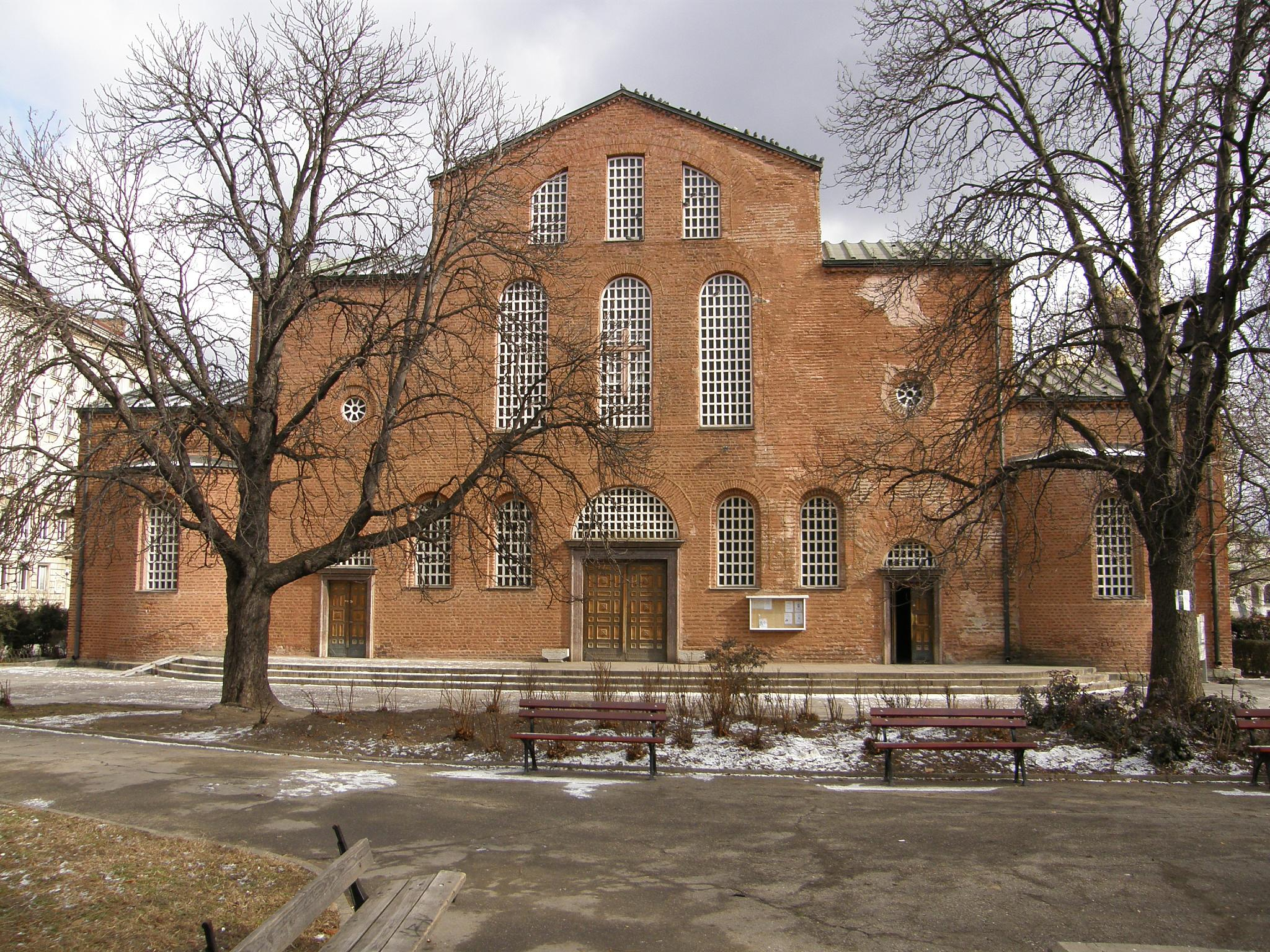
Saint Sofia Basilica (6th century)

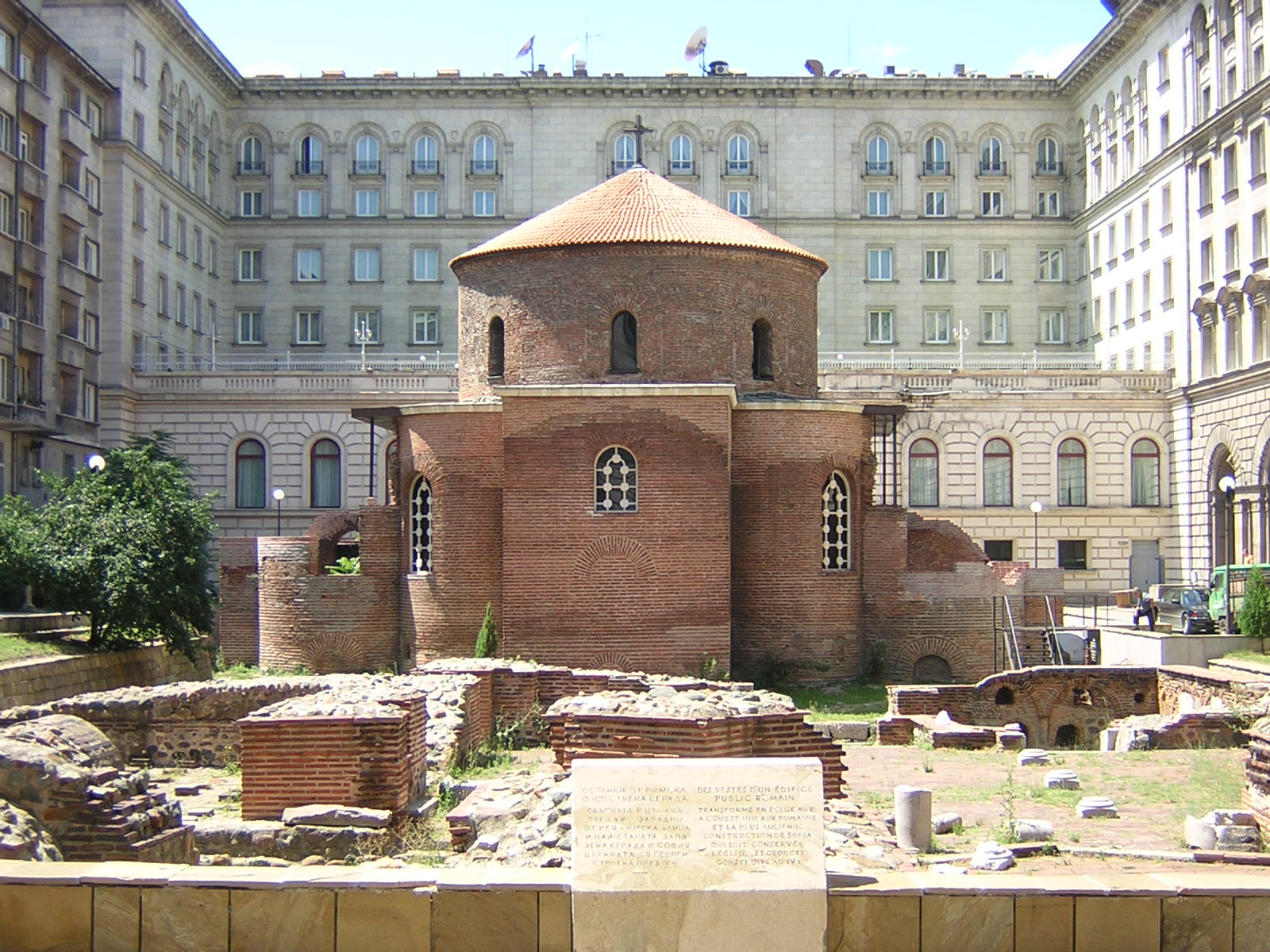
The St. George Rotunda (4th century) with remains of Serdica in the foreground

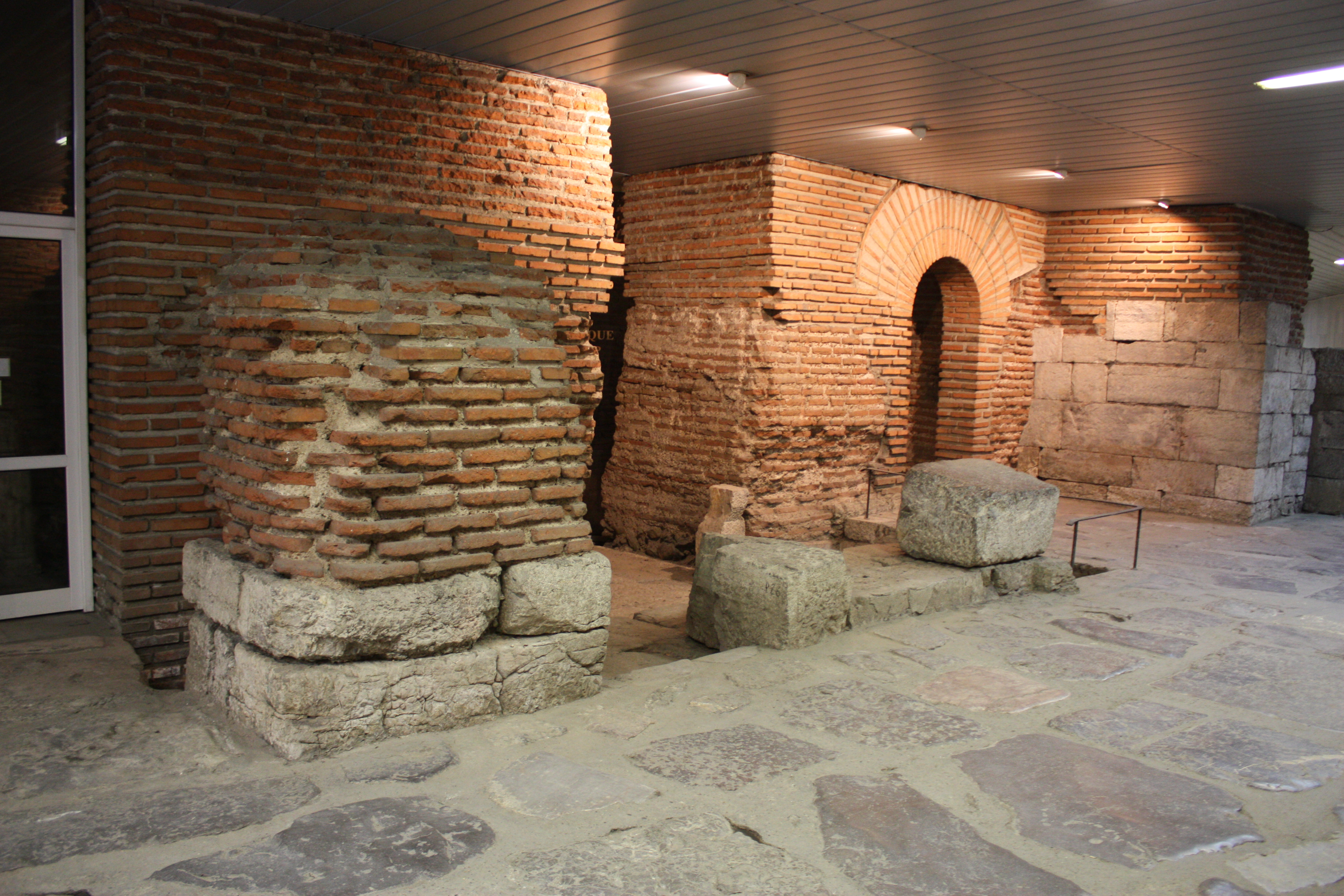
Eastern Gate (in subway)

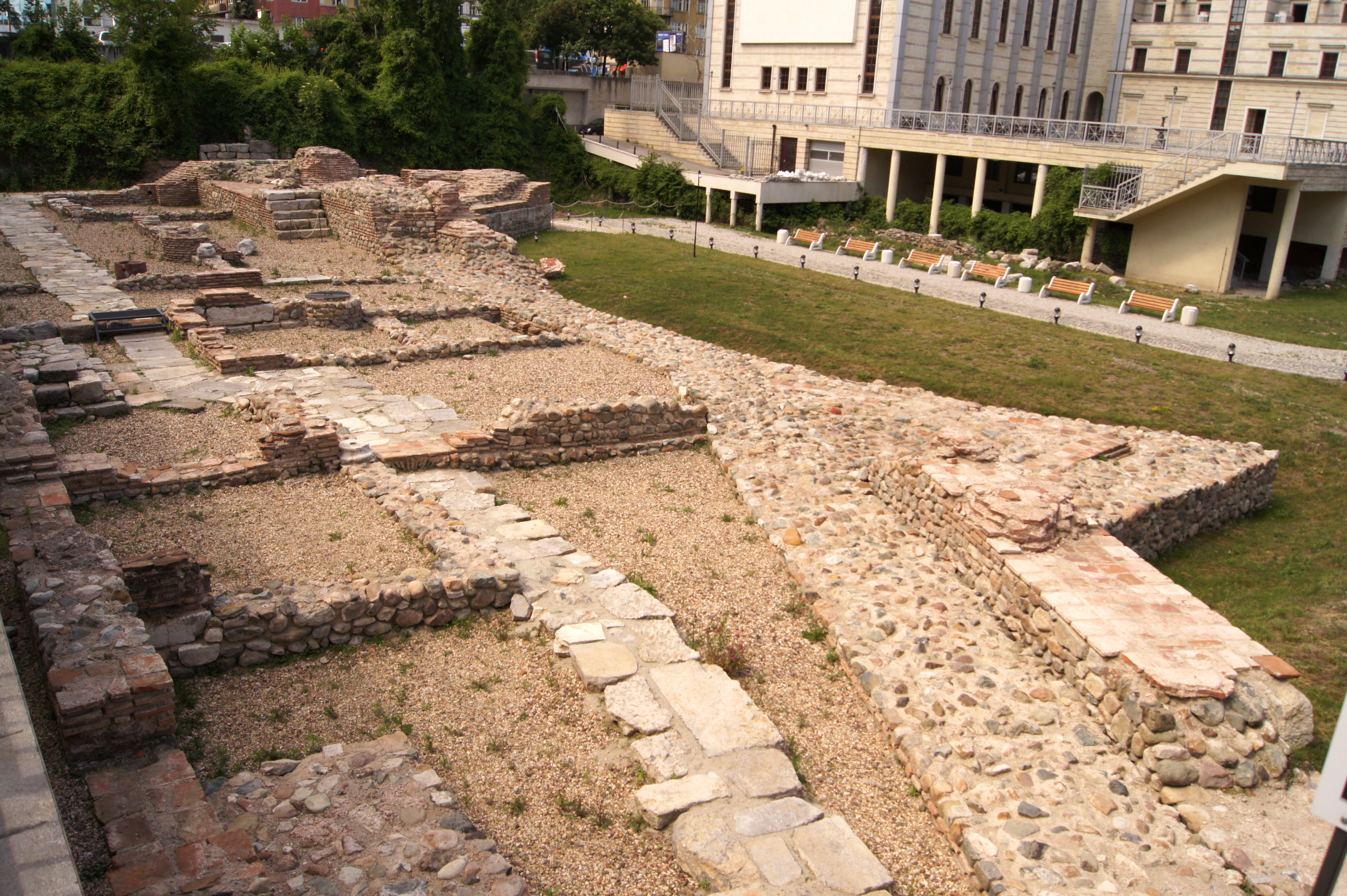
Western gate and double walls

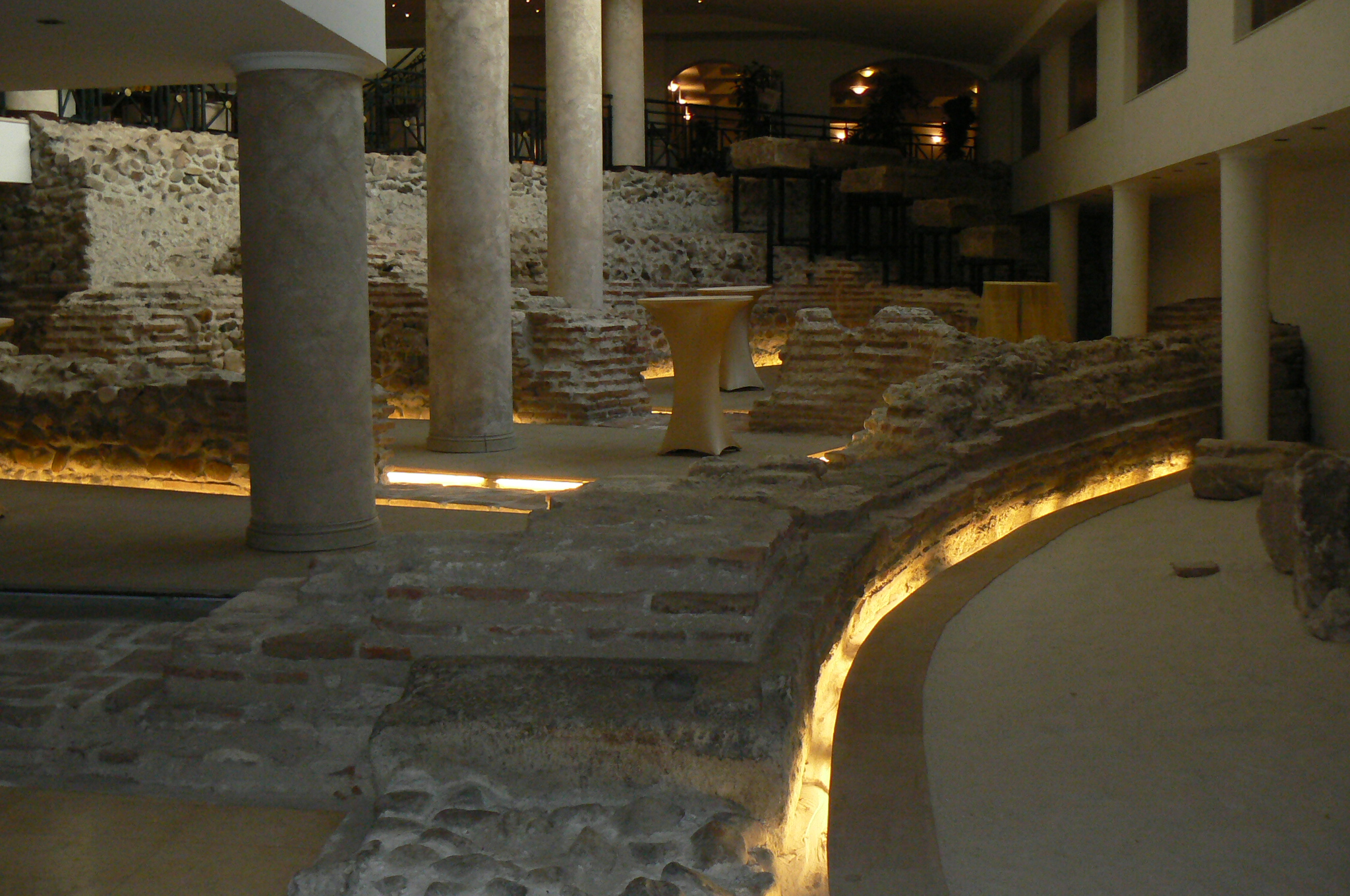
Amphitheatre remains inside the Arena di Serdica hotel, a pastiche of classicism

A Neolithic settlement discovered in Slatina, in today's north-eastern Sofia, is dated to be from the 6th millennium BC. Another Neolithic settlement around the National Art Gallery is traced to the 3rd–4th millennium BC.

The earliest tribes who settled were the Thracian Tilataei. In the 500s BC, the area became part of a Thracian union, the Odrysian kingdom.

In 339 BC Philip II of Macedon destroyed and ravaged the town.

The Celtic tribe Serdi gave their name to the city of Serdica. The earliest mention of the city comes from an Athenian inscription from the 1st century BC, attesting Astiu ton Serdon, i.e. city of the Serdi. A local inscription and Dio Cassius recorded that the Roman general Crassus subdued the Serdi and beheaded the captives.

Around 29 BC, Serdica was conquered by the Romans.

It gradually became the most important Roman city of the region and became a municipium, or centre of an administrative region, during the reign of Emperor Trajan (98-117) and was renamed Ulpia Serdica.

The city was burnt and destroyed in 170 by the Costoboci and the city was rebuilt, this time with its first defensive walls between 176-180 under Marcus Aurelius as evidenced by inscriptions above the gates.

The city expanded again, as public baths, administrative and cult buildings, a civic basilica and a large theatre, were built. When Emperor Diocletian divided the province of Dacia into Dacia Ripensis (on the banks of the Danube) and Dacia Mediterranea, Serdica became the capital of the latter.

Roman emperors Aurelian (215–275) and Galerius (260–311) were born in Serdica.

In 268 a Gothic raid ravaged and burned parts of the city including the theatre which was abandoned.

The city continued to expand and became a significant political and economical centre, more so as it became one of the first Roman cities where Christianity was recognised as an official religion. The Edict of Toleration was issued in 311 in Serdica by the Roman emperor Galerius, officially ending the Diocletianic persecution of Christianity. The Edict implicitly granted Christianity the status of "religio licita", a worship recognized and accepted by the Roman Empire. It was the first edict legalising Christianity, preceding the Edict of Milan by two years. Moreover, in the Edict of Milan, only one sentence was dropped: “Ne quid contra disciplinam agent.” So the Edict of Milan preached unconditional religious tolerance where the Edict of Serdica stated a conditional tolerance (meaning of disciplinam here is: unless they, the christians, disturb the good or social order of the State).

Serdica was the capital of the Diocese of Dacia (337-602).

An amphitheatre was built over the remains of the theatre under Diocletian (284–305) and later under Constantine the Great (306–337).

For Constantine the Great it was 'Sardica mea Roma est' (Serdica is my Rome). He considered making Serdica the capital of the Byzantine Empire instead of Constantinople.

The Tetrarchs' and Constantine's efforts to secure a large supply network for the Danube army by building a large number of horrea in the late 3rd and early 4th centuries appears to have included Serdica as a principal gathering base due to the 8 horrea discovered by excavation.

In 343, the Council of Sardica was held in a church located where the current 6th century Church of Saint Sofia was later built.

=== Archaeology ===
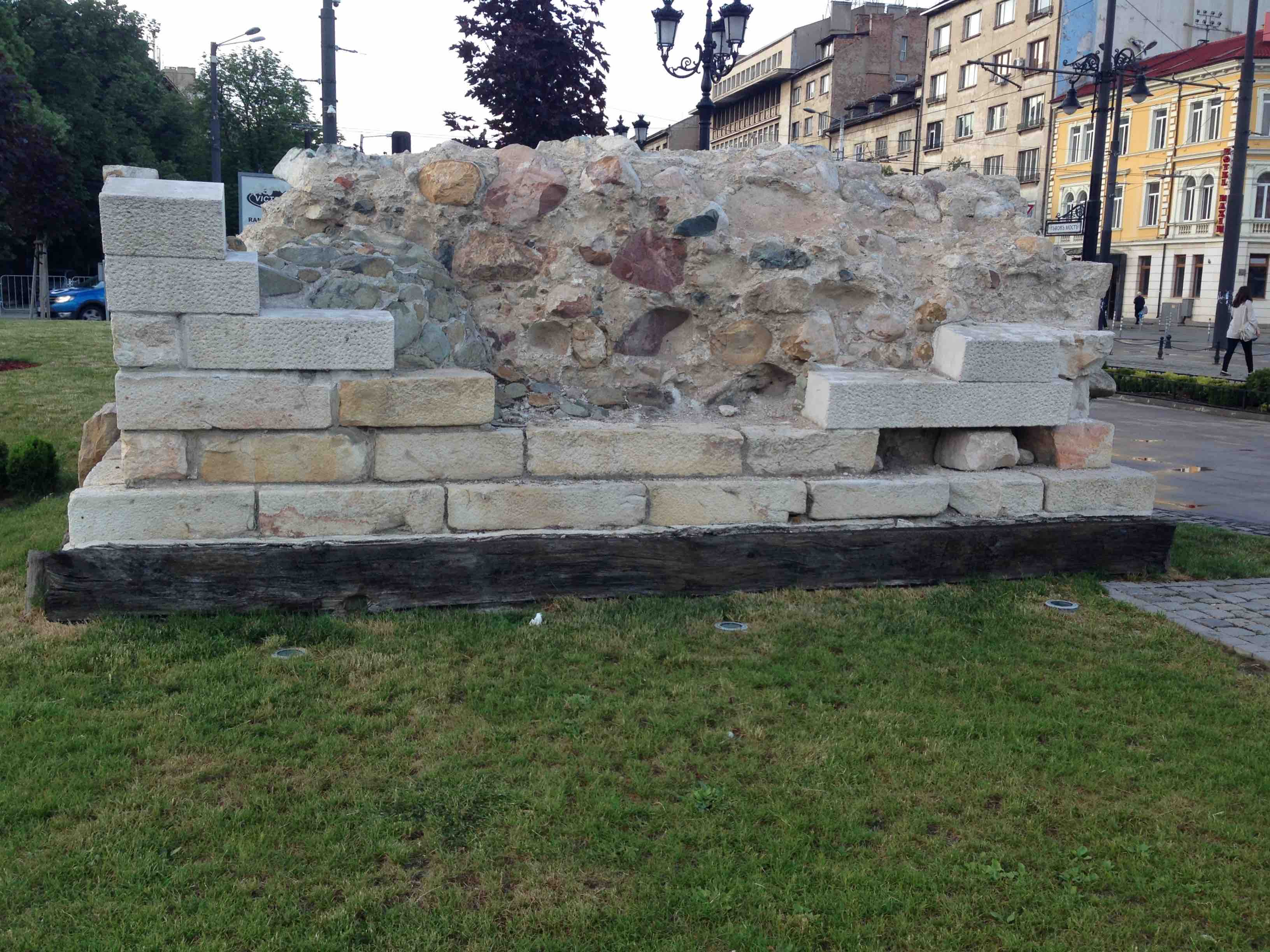
Buttress of Roman bridge of Serdica, 4-6th c.

Many remains of the ancient city have been excavated and are on public display today. These include:

- Complex Ancient Serdica
- eastern gate
- western gate
- city walls
- thermal baths
- bridge over the river (near the Lion's bridge)
- 4th c. church of St. George Rotunda
- amphitheatre of Serdica
- the tombs and basilicas under the basilica of St. Sophia

Under Constantine the city expanded to the north of the walls (the so-called Northern Appendix) and the Roman bridge over the river became an important part of this area.

A set of no less than 8 horrea (warehouses) were found inside the southwestern quarter of the walls and dated to the early 4th century indicate that Serdica was probably a supply-centre of regional importance, connected to the Danube by the valley of the river Iskur (Oescus).

== Middle Ages ==
The city was destroyed by the Huns in 447.

It was rebuilt by Byzantine Emperor Justinian in the 6th century and was renamed Triaditsa. It again flourished during the reign of Justinian I, when its defensive walls were reinforced by doubling their thickness and adding more towers, and whose remnants can still be seen today.

Although also often destroyed by the Slavs, the town remained under Byzantine dominion until 809, when it first became part of the First Bulgarian Empire during the reign of Khan Krum. Afterwards, it was known by the Bulgarian name Sredets and grew into an important fortress and administrative centre. The Byzantines referred to Sredez as Triaditsa.

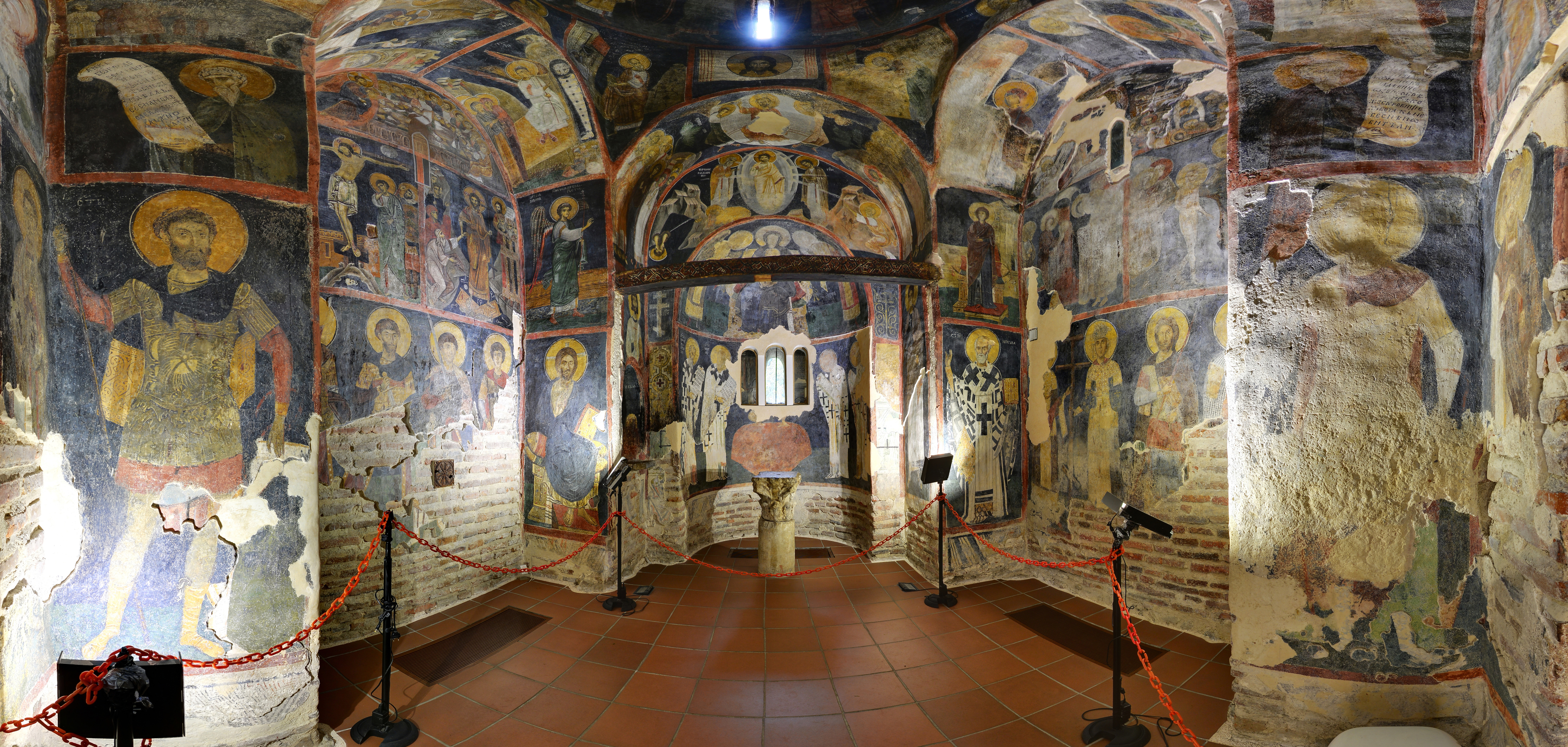
Interior view with the frescoes dating back to 1259, Boyana Church in Sofia, UNESCO World Heritage List landmark.

After a number of unsuccessful sieges, the city fell again to the Byzantine Empire in 1018. In 1128, Sredets suffered a Magyar raid as part of the Byzantine Empire, but in 1191 was once again incorporated into the restored Bulgarian Empire at the time of Tsar Ivan Asen I after the Vlach-Bulgarian Rebellion.

During the Second Bulgarian Empire the title of Sebastokrator, used for the ruler of Sredets, was second only to that of the Tsar (Emperor) of Bulgaria. Some known holders of the title are Kaloyan, Peter and their relative Aleksandar Asen (d. after 1232), a son of Ivan Asen I of Bulgaria (r. 1189–1196).

From the 12th to the 14th century, the city was a thriving centre of trade and crafts. It was renamed Sofia in 1376 after the Church of St Sophia. However, it was called both "Sofia" and "Sredets" until the 16th century, when the new name gradually replaced the old one.

During the whole of the Middle Ages, Sofia remained known for its goldsmithing, particularly aided by the wealth of mineral resources in the neighbouring mountains. This is evidenced by the number of gold treasures excavated from the period and even from Antiquity.

== Ottoman period ==
A Bulgarian Cyrillic document from the early Ottoman rule of the city

In 1385 Sofia was besieged and conquered by the Ottoman Empire during the reign of Murad I. Ottoman subjects from Anatolia joined the predominantly Bulgarian-speaking population during that time. Sofia saw the 1443 crusade of John Hunyadi and Władysław III of Varna, a desperate effort to drive out the Ottomans. The crusade failed and many residents of Sofia were persecuted for their participation, particularly those from the elite classes.

From the 14th century till the 19th century Sofia was an important administrative center in the Ottoman Empire. It became the capital of the beylerbeylik of Rumelia (Rumelia Eyalet), the province that administered the Ottoman lands in Europe (the Balkans), one of the two together with the beylerbeylik of Anatolia. It was the capital of the important Sanjak of Sofia as well, including the whole of Thrace with Plovdiv and Edirne, and part of Macedonia with Thessaloniki and Skopje.

During that time Sofia was the largest import-export base in modern-day Bulgaria for the caravan trade with the Republic of Ragusa.

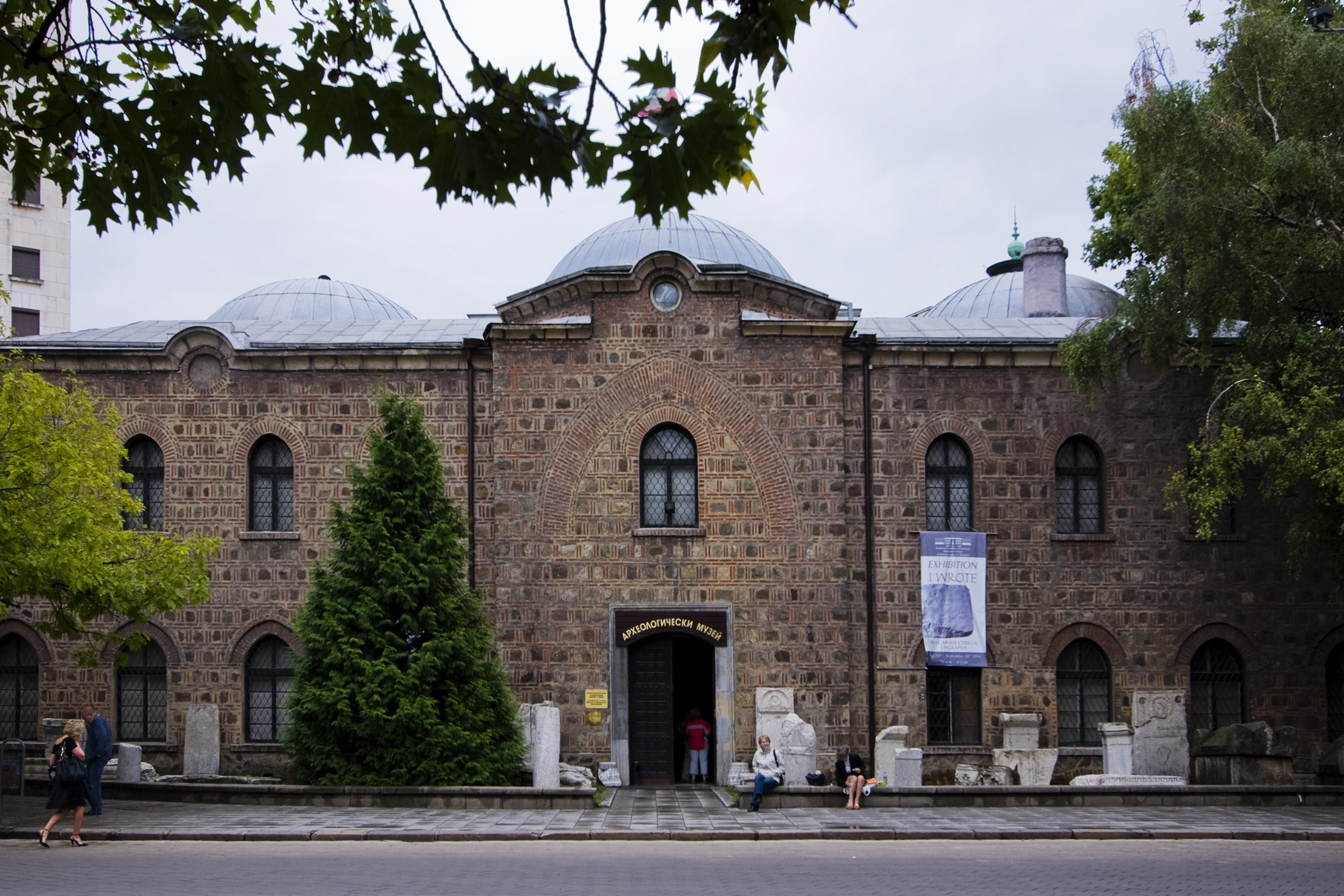
National National Archaeological Museum (Bulgaria) housed in an Ottoman building which construction took place between 1451 and 1494

With a significant growth in population, many Ottoman buildings emerged during the 15th and 16th centuries onwards. Few of them are preserved today, including only a single functioning mosque, Banya Bashi. This period was one of great diversity as well as public investments in infrastructure, education and the local economy. Amongst others the sources mention eight jama masjid (congregational mosques), three public libraries, numerous schools, 12 churches, three synagogues, and the largest bedesten of the Balkans.

The tax registers of the 16th century witness a significant rise in the Muslim population at the expense of Bulgarian-speaking Orthodox Christians: there were 915 Muslim and 317 Christian households in 1524–1525, 1325 Muslim, 173 Christian and 88 Jewish in 1544–1545, 892 Muslim, 386 Christian, 126 Jewish and 49 Romani in 1570–1571, as well as 1017 Muslim, 257 Christian, 127 Jewish and 38 Roma households in 1573.

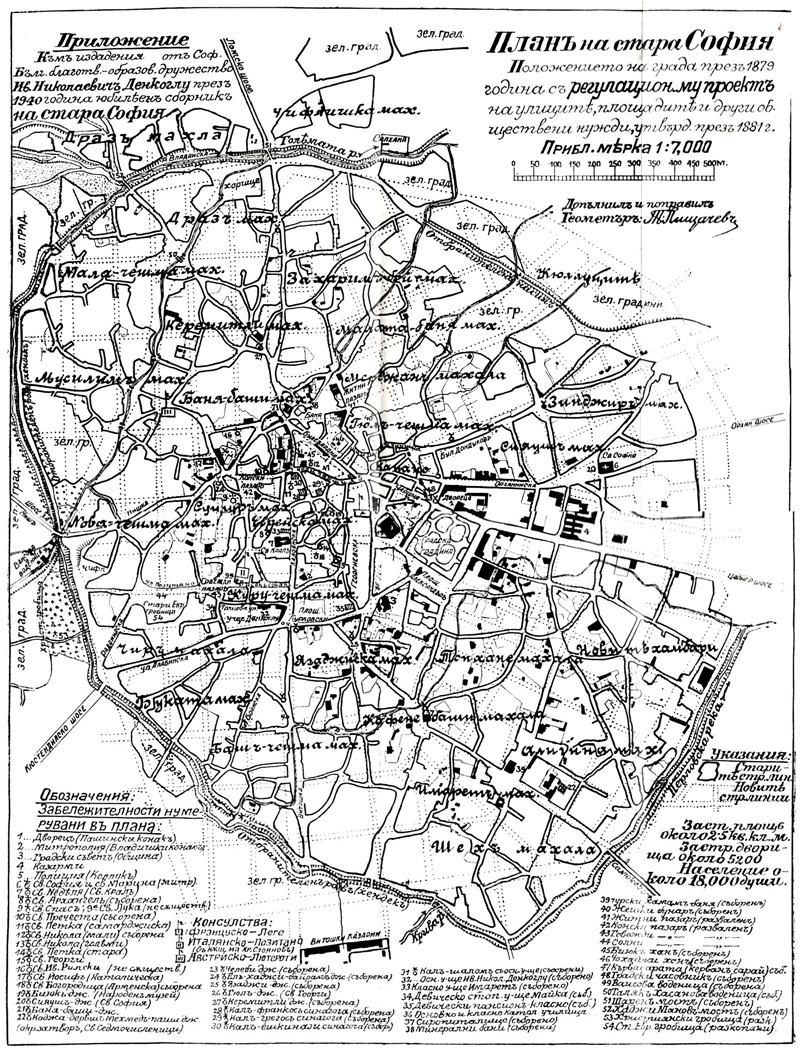
Ottoman Sofia map in 1879 with the 1881 master plan of today's streets superimposed

As already mentioned, Ottoman rule brought major demographic growth for Sofia. As the city became a centre of commercial activity, it grew from a total population of 6,000 (1620s) through 55,000 (middle 17th century) to 70-80,000 (18th century). This data from foreign travellers is most possibly exaggerated, but still shows the significance of Sofia during these times.

During the 16th century, Sofia was a thriving trade centre inhabited by Bulgarians, Romaniote, Ashkenazi and Sephardic Jews, Armenians, Greeks and Ragusan merchants. In the 17th century, the city's population even included Albanians and Persians. At the end of the Ottoman occupation, the city had a population of 20,501, of whom 56% were Bulgarian, 30% Jewish, 7% Turkish and 6% Roma.

In 1610 the Vatican established the Bishopric of Sofia for Ottoman subjects belonging to the Catholic millet in Rumelia, which existed until 1715 when most Catholics had emigrated to Habsburg or Tsarist territories.

== 19th and 20th centuries ==
Sofia was seized by Russian forces in 1878, during the Russo-Turkish War, 1877-78, and became the capital of the autonomous Principality of Bulgaria in 1879, which became the Kingdom of Bulgaria in 1908.

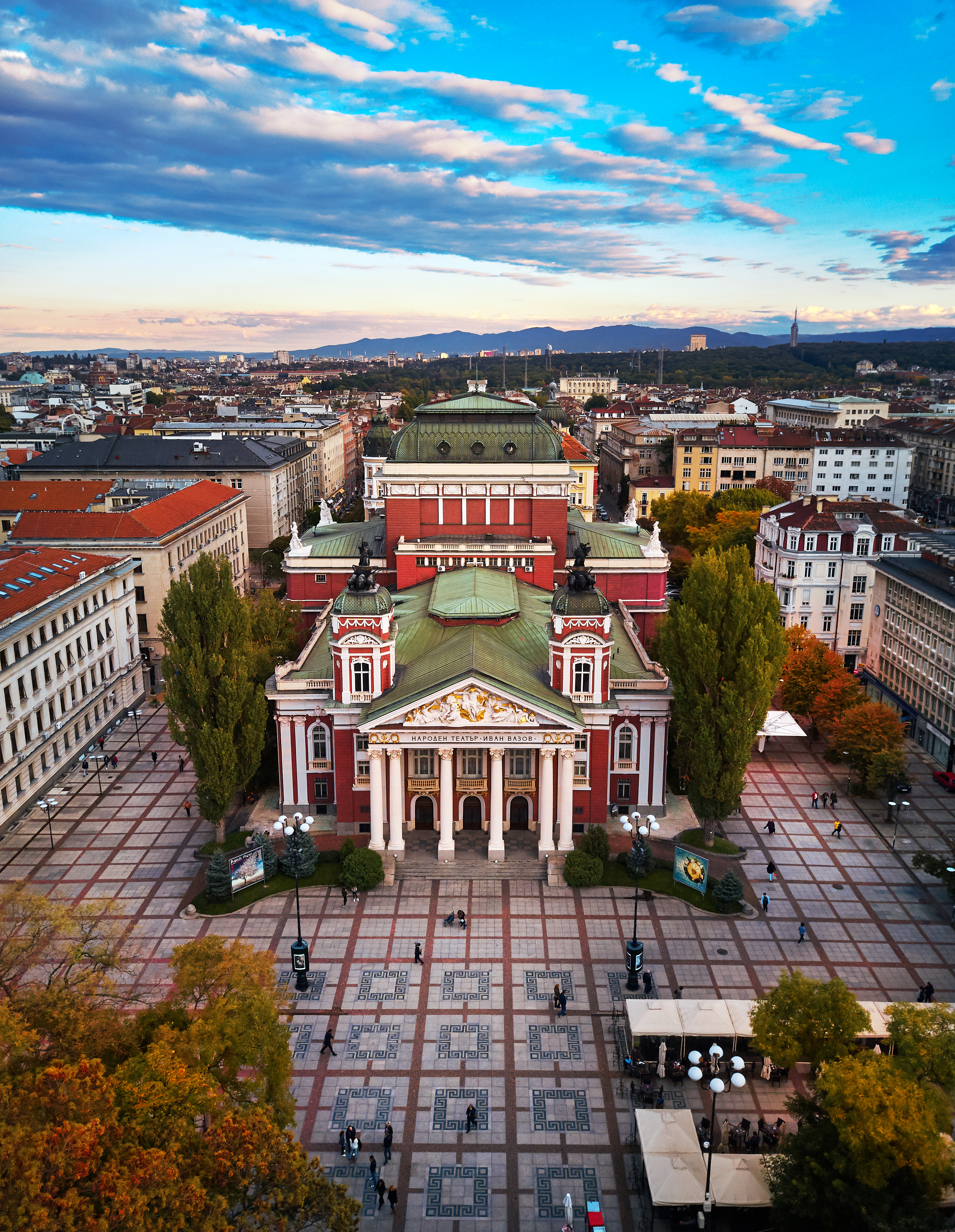
Ivan Vazov National Theatre

Most mosques in Sofia perished in that war, seven of them destroyed in one night in December 1878 when a thunderstorm masked the noise of the explosions arranged by Russian military engineers. Following the war, the great majority of the Muslim population left Sofia.

In 1907 the Monument to the Tsar Liberator was inaugurated on Tsar Osvoboditel Boulevard in Sofia.

In 1925, the gravest act of terrorism in Bulgarian history, the St Nedelya Church assault, was carried out by the Bulgarian Communist Party, claiming the lives of 150 and injuring other 500.

During World War II, Sofia was bombed by Allied aircraft in late 1943 and early 1944, as well as later occupied by the Soviet Union. Bulgaria's regime which allied the country with Nazi Germany was overthrown and Sofia became capital of the Communist-ruled People's Republic of Bulgaria (1946–1989).

== See also ==
- Timeline of Sofia
- History of the Jews in Sofia
- Serdi
- First Bulgarian Empire
- Second Bulgarian Empire
- Ancient Roman architecture
- Edict of Serdica
- List of oldest church buildings
- List of the oldest buildings in Sofia
- History of Bulgaria
- Architecture of the Tarnovo Artistic School
- Principality of Bulgaria
- Kingdom of Bulgaria

== Sources and references ==
- Gigova, Irina. "The City and the Nation: Sofia's Trajectory from Glory to Rubble in WWII," Journal of Urban History, March 2011, Vol. 37 Issue 2, pp 155–175; the 110 footnotes provide a guide to the literature on the city
- Sardica
- "Sofia — 129 Years Capital" (in Bulgarian). Municipal website of Sofia. Archived from the original on 2006-04-23.
- Wild, Michael (2015). Baedeker's Constantinople. ISBN 9781326174477.
