= Church of Saint George, Sofia =

Red brick rotunda in Sofia, Bulgaria

Church of Saint George
- Ротонда „Свети Георги“
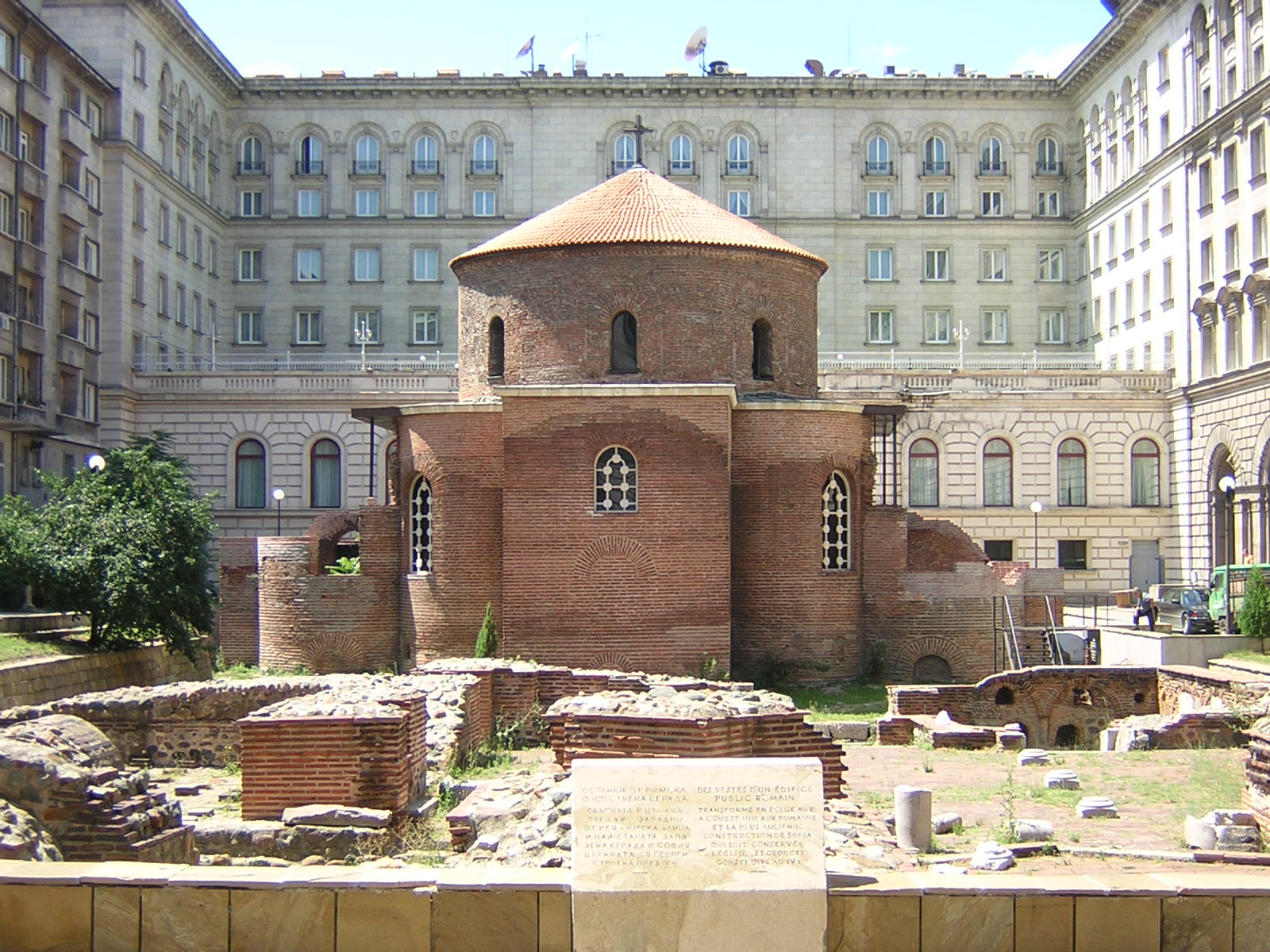
- The St. George Rotunda and some remains of Serdica can be seen in the foreground

- Location of the church in Sofia
- Church of Saint George
- 42°41′49″N 23°19′22″E
- Location: Sofia
- Country: Bulgaria
- Denomination: Eastern Orthodox
- Previous denomination: Islam
- Tradition: Bulgarian Orthodox

History
- Status: Roman baths (4th century); Church; Mosque (16th century–c. 1850s); Church (since c. 1850s– )
- Dedication: Saint George (Sveti Georgi)

Architecture
- Architectural type: Roman baths
- Completed: 4th century CE

Specifications
- Materials: Red bricks

The Church of Saint George (Bulgarian: Ротонда „Свети Георги“, romanized: Rotonda "Sveti Georgi") is a late antique red brick rotunda in Sofia, Bulgaria. Built in the early 4th century CE as Roman baths, it became a church inside the walls of Serdica, capital of ancient Dacia Mediterranea during the Roman and Byzantine eras. The early Christian church is considered the oldest building in modern Sofia and belongs to the Bulgarian Orthodox Church.

The building, a cylindrical domed structure built on a square base, is famous for the 12th-, 13th-, and 14th-century frescoes inside the central dome. Three layers of frescoes have been discovered, the earliest dating from the 10th century. Frescoes of 22 prophets over two metres (six point six feet) tall crown the dome. Painted over during the Ottoman era, when the building was used as a mosque, these frescoes were only uncovered and restored in the 20th century.

== History and architecture ==
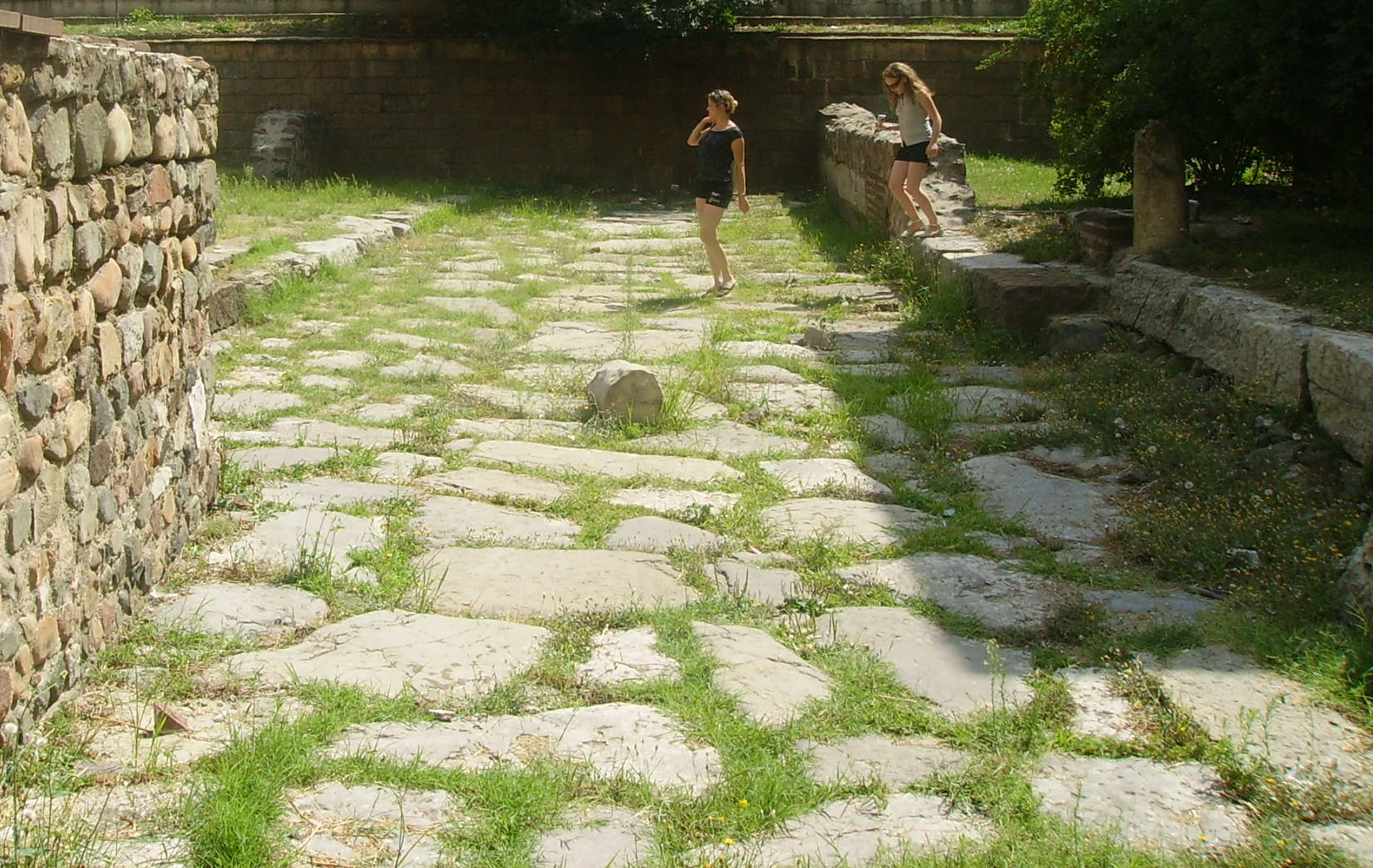
Roman street

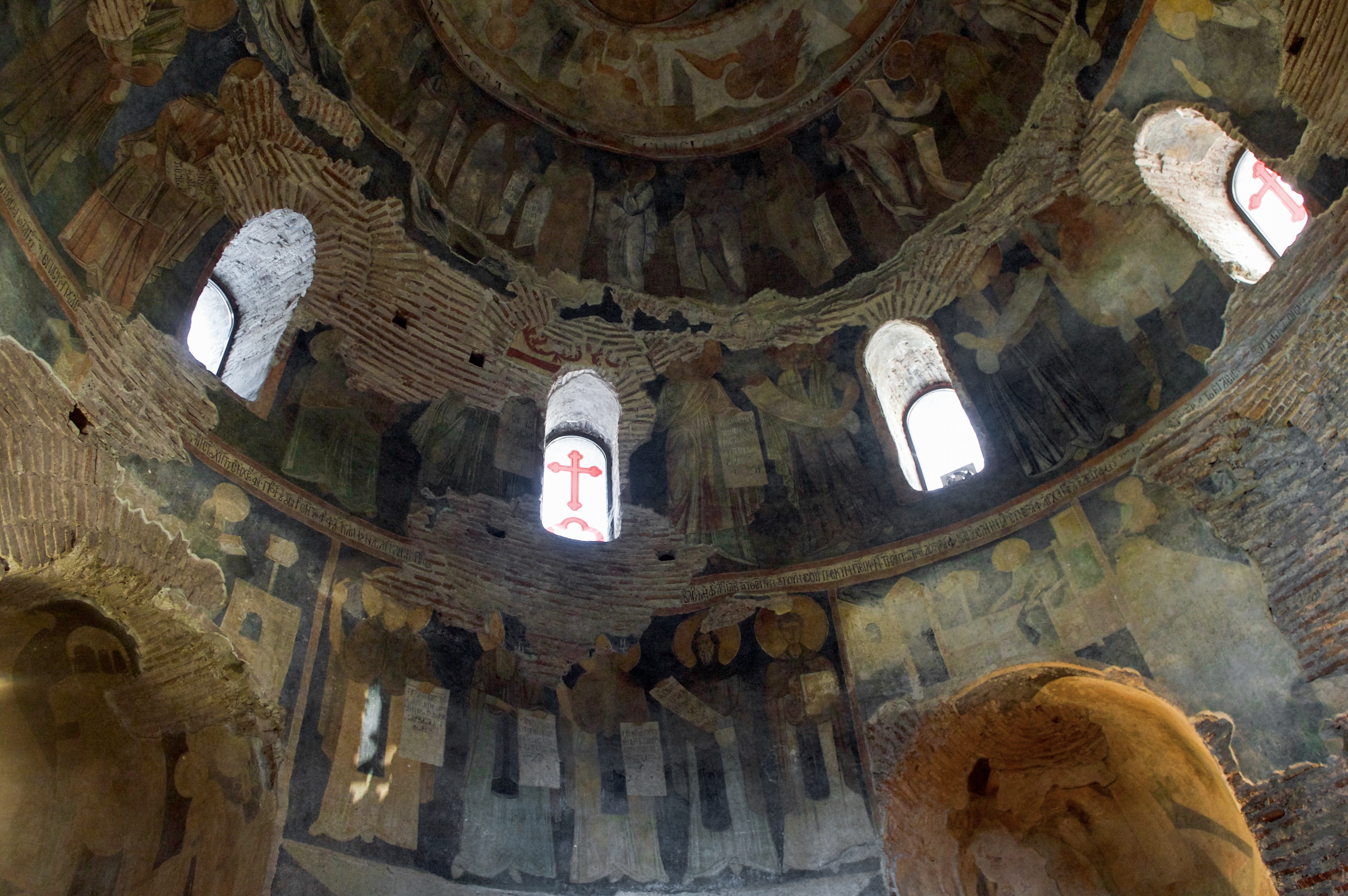
Frescoes from the Byzantine and two distinct Bulgarian periods inside the church dome

The church is located in the courtyard between Hotel Balkan and the Presidency at a level a few metres below the modern streets of the capital. It is considered to be the oldest preserved building in the city, built at a time when Sofia was the residence of the emperors Galerius and Constantine the Great.

The church is part of a larger archaeological complex. Behind the apse, there are ancient ruins: a section of a Roman street with preserved drainage, foundations of a large basilica, probably a public building, and some smaller buildings. One of the buildings had been equipped with hypocaust and the tiles lifting the floor can be seen today. Experts define it as one of the most beautiful buildings in the so-called "Constantine district" of Serdika-Sredets, where the palace of Emperor Constantine the Great, and later of Sebastokrator Kaloyan were situated. Having survived the trials of time and having kept its appearance almost untouched, it is assumed that some of the most important meetings of the Council of Serdica had taken place in the church.

The Rotunda is a part of a large complex of ancient buildings from the late 3rd and early 4th century. It was built of red bricks and has a complex symmetry. At the centre, there is a domed rotunda room with a circular plan on a square base with semicircular niches in the corners. Since the 4th century, it has been used for christening (baptising) ceremonies. The dome is 13.7 metres (45 ft) high. Through the centuries it had been used as a public, religious and even a representative building.

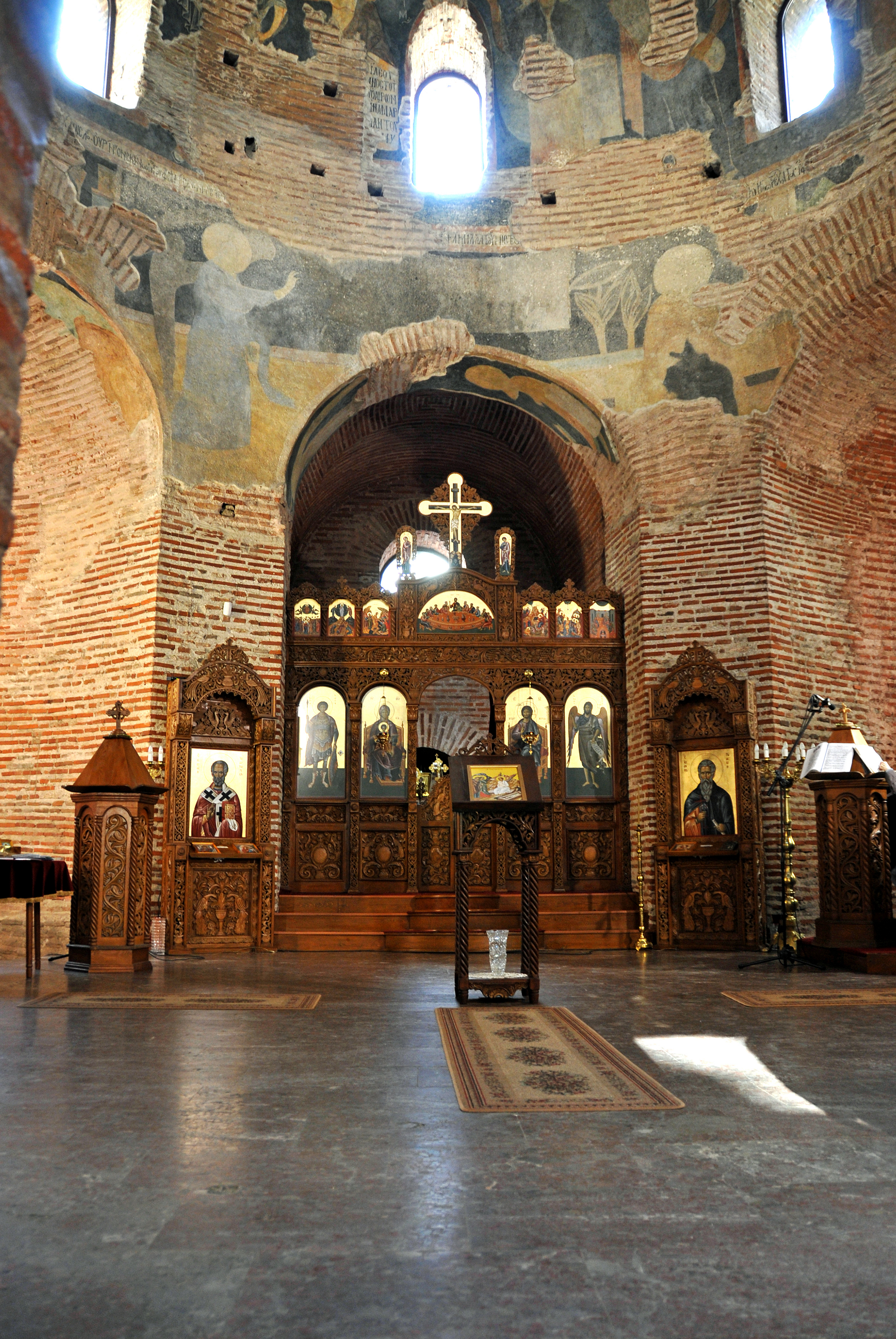
Interior of Church of St. George, Sofia

There are five layers of partially preserved frescoes on the walls: the oldest is a Roman-Byzantine with floral motifs from the 4th century; the second in Bulgarian medieval style with angels from the 10th century; the third from the 11th and 12th centuries – a frieze with prophets and frescoes depicting the Ascension, Assumption, etc.; the fourth is from the 14th century with a donor's portrait of a bishop north of the entrance, and the fifth with Islamic ornamental motifs.

Outstanding among all the murals is the one from the 10th century, created most probably during the reign of the emperors Simeon I the Great, Peter I and Samuil. The soulful human face of an angel, painted under the dome, is unique and one of the most influential examples of the high mastery of Bulgarian artistic school of the golden age of the First Bulgarian Empire.

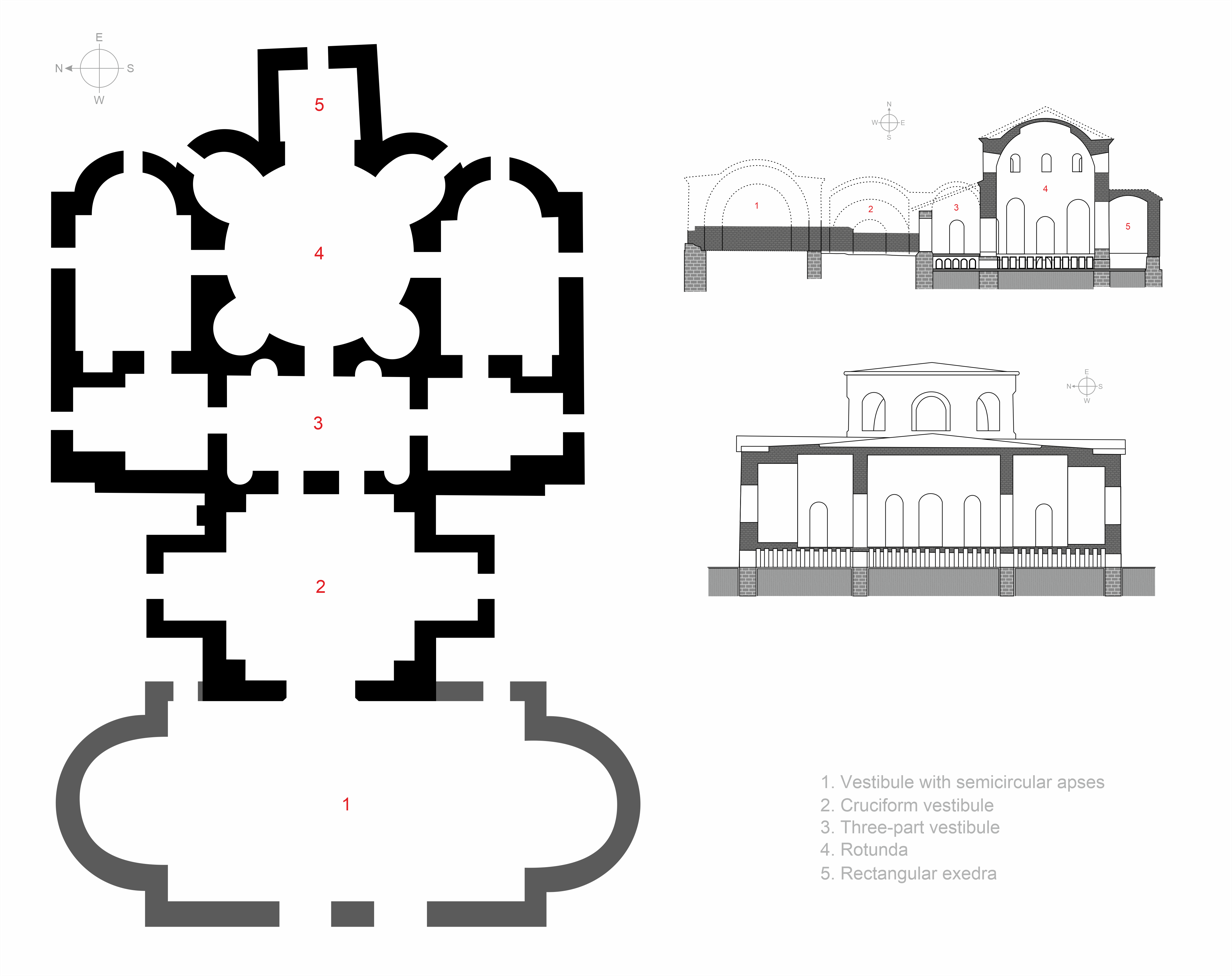
Church of Saint George, Sofia - plan

Holy relics of the patron saint of Bulgaria - John of Rila - were kept inside the church and, according to legend, they were used to cure the Byzantine Emperor Manuel Comnenus. The relics were taken by the Hungarians in 1183, during the reign of Béla III, when allied Serbs and Magyar troops invaded, destroyed and looted the city.

After a short stay in the capital Esztergom, where the Catholic bishop lost his ability to talk after an indecent act with the relics, they were returned to the recently restored Bulgarian Empire in 1187. The relics of the saint rested here again when they were solemnly carried from the then-capital Tarnovo to the Rila Monastery in 1469. At first, here was buried the Serbian king Stefan Milutin, himself beatified, whose relics were later transferred to the Church of St. King (today, the Sveta Nedelya Church).

During the Ottoman rule in the 16th century, the church became a mosque. In the middle of the 19th century, the Rotunda, along with the Saint Sofia Church and the Sofia Mosque (today National Archaeological Museum) were abandoned by Muslims. Not long later, the Bulgarian Orthodox Church reclaimed its previous use as a Christian church.

Despite its small size, the church is similar to the Rotunda of Galerius in Thessaloniki. Carrying the spirit of the early Christian era and Bulgarian medieval culture, St. George has a huge cultural impact. It is subject to extensive research and legitimate interest not only among the Orthodox and Catholic church communities and prominent science and culture figures, but it attracts many pilgrims and ordinary tourists.

In exceptional occasions, the church is used as a setting for solemn military ceremonies and concerts with Orthodox and classical music.

== See also ==
- List of churches in Sofia
- Christianization of Bulgaria
- List of oldest church buildings
- Ancient Roman architecture
- Ancient Roman and Byzantine domes
- Edict of Serdica
- History of Sofia
