= Serdica =

Historical name of Sofia, the capital of Bulgaria

Coordinates: 42°41′52″N 23°19′23″E

- Interactive map of Serdica

Serdica or Sardica is the historical Roman city that was located in today's Sofia, the capital of Bulgaria.

The name is found in the Serdica Fortress in the center of the city, and the administrative subdivision of Serdika.

== History ==
The Celtic tribe Serdi gave their name to the city. The earliest mention of the city comes from an Athenian inscription from the 1st century BC, attesting Astiu ton Serdon, i.e. city of the Serdi. A local inscription and Dio Cassius recorded that the Roman general Crassus subdued the Serdi and beheaded the captives.

Around 29 BC, Serdica was conquered by the Romans.

It gradually became the most important Roman city of the region and became a municipium, or centre of an administrative region, during the reign of Emperor Trajan (98-117) and was renamed Ulpia Serdica.

The city was burnt and destroyed in 170 by the Costoboci, and the city was rebuilt, this time with its first defensive walls between 176-180 under Marcus Aurelius, as evidenced by inscriptions above the gates.

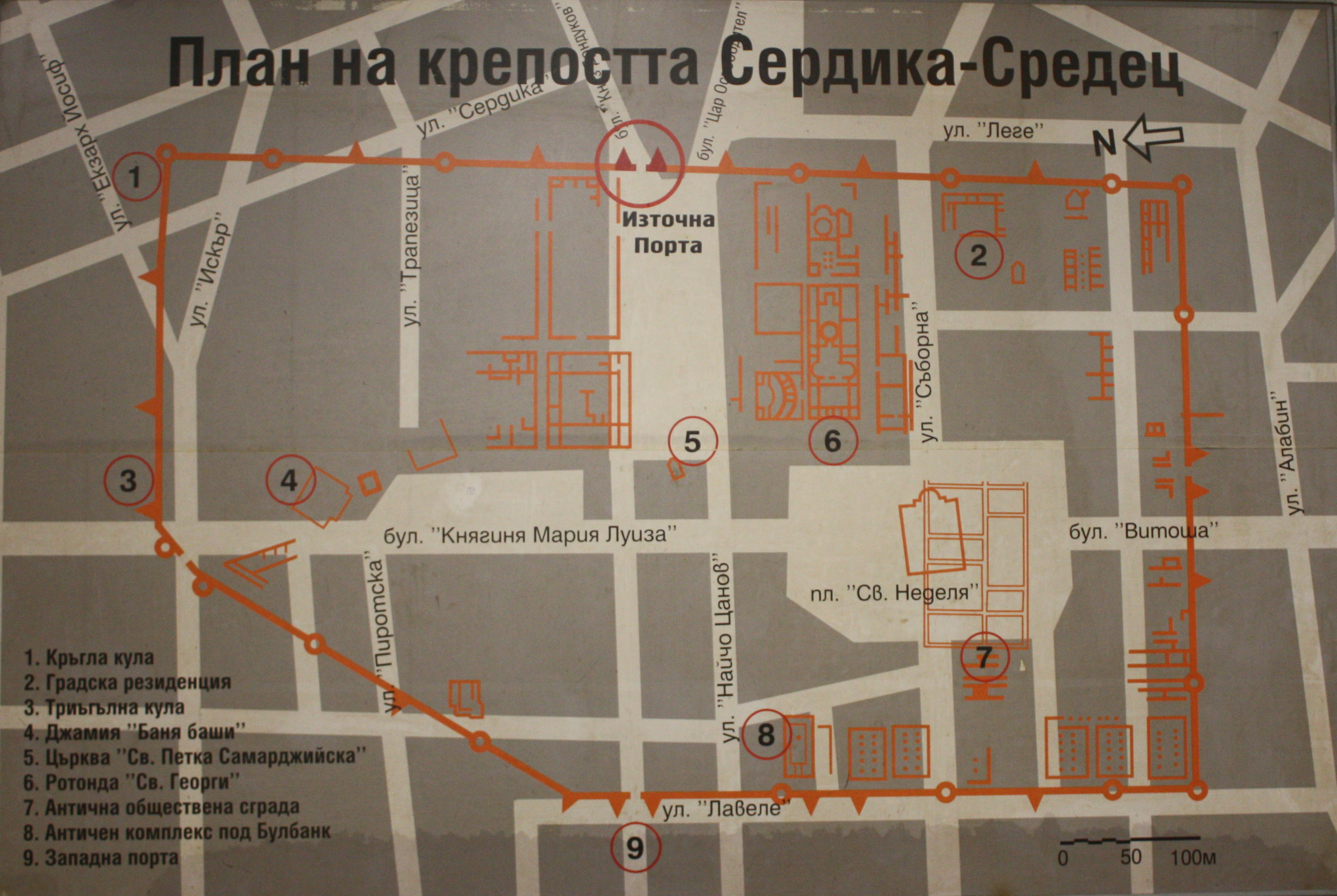
Plan of the Serdica fortress and the archaeological sites. (/\/\) at the top marks the East gate. Legend: 1. Round tower 2. City residence 3. Triangular tower 4. Banya Bashi Mosque 5. Church of St Petka of the Saddlers 6. Rotunda of St. George 7. Ancient public building 8. Antique complex under the Bulbank building 9. West gate

The city expanded again, as public baths, administrative and cult buildings, a civic basilica and a large theatre, were built. When Emperor Diocletian divided the province of Dacia into Dacia Ripensis (on the banks of the Danube) and Dacia Mediterranea, Serdica became the capital of the latter.

Roman emperors Aurelian (215–275) and Galerius (260–311) were born in Serdica.

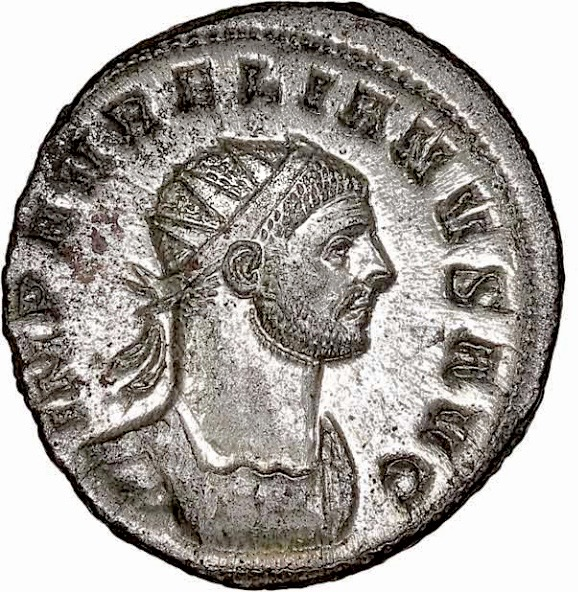
Antoninianus of Aurelian minted in Serdica in 274 A.D.

In 268 a Gothic raid ravaged and burned parts of the city including the theatre which was abandoned.

The city continued to expand and became a significant political and economical centre, more so as it became one of the first Roman cities where Christianity was recognised as an official religion. The Edict of Serdica, an Edict of Toleration, was issued in 311 in Serdica by the Roman emperor Galerius, officially ending the Diocletianic persecution of Christianity. The Edict implicitly granted Christianity the status of "religio licita", a worship recognized and accepted by the Roman Empire. It was the first edict legalising Christianity, preceding the Edict of Milan by two years. Moreover, in the Edict of Milan, only one sentence was dropped: “Ne quid contra disciplinam agent.” So the Edict of Milan preached unconditional religious tolerance where the Edict of Serdica stated a conditional tolerance (meaning of disciplinam here is: unless they, the christians, disturb the good or social order of the State).

Serdica was the capital of the Diocese of Dacia (337-602).

The amphitheatre of Serdica was built over the remains of the theatre under Diocletian (284–305) and later under Constantine the Great (306–337).

For Constantine the Great it was 'Sardica mea Roma est' (Serdica is my Rome). He considered making Serdica the capital of the Byzantine Empire instead of Constantinople.

The Tetrarchs' and Constantine's efforts to secure a large supply network for the Danube army by building a large number of horrea in the late 3rd and early 4th centuries appears to have included Serdica as a principal gathering base due to the 8 horrea discovered by excavation.

In 343, the Council of Sardica was held in a church located where the current 6th century Church of Saint Sofia was later built.

The city was destroyed by the Huns in 447. It was rebuilt by Byzantine Emperor Justinian in the 6th century and was renamed Triaditsa.

The city's name was later used for the Diocese of Sardica.

=== Archaeology ===
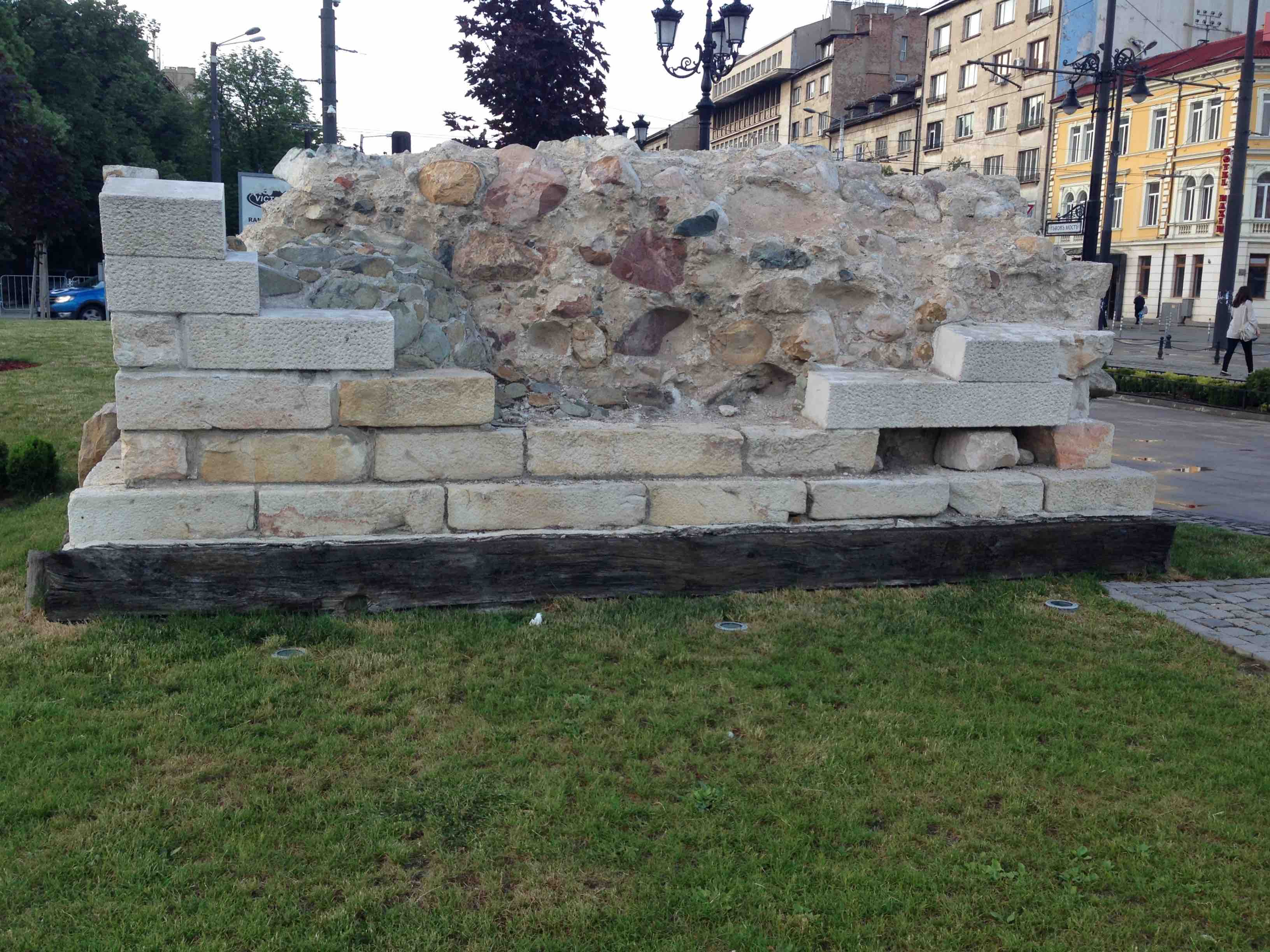
Buttress of Roman bridge of Serdica, 4-6th c.

Many remains of the ancient city have been excavated and are on public display today. These include:

- Complex Ancient Serdica
- eastern gate
- western gate
- city walls
- thermal baths
- bridge over the river (near the Lion's bridge)
- 4th c. church of St. George Rotunda
- amphitheatre of Serdica
- the tombs and basilicas under the basilica of St. Sophia

Under Constantine the city expanded to the north of the walls (the so-called Northern Appendix) and the Roman bridge over the river became an important part of this area.

A set of no less than 8 horrea (warehouses) were found inside the southwestern quarter of the walls and dated to the early 4th century indicate that Serdica was probably a supply-centre of regional importance, connected to the Danube by the valley of the river Iskur (Oescus).

== Legacy ==
Serdica Peak on Livingston Island, in the South Shetland Islands, Antarctica, is named after Serdica.

Serdica is a titular see of the Roman Catholic Church.

== See also ==
- History of Sofia
