= Serdi =

Celtic tribe in Thrace

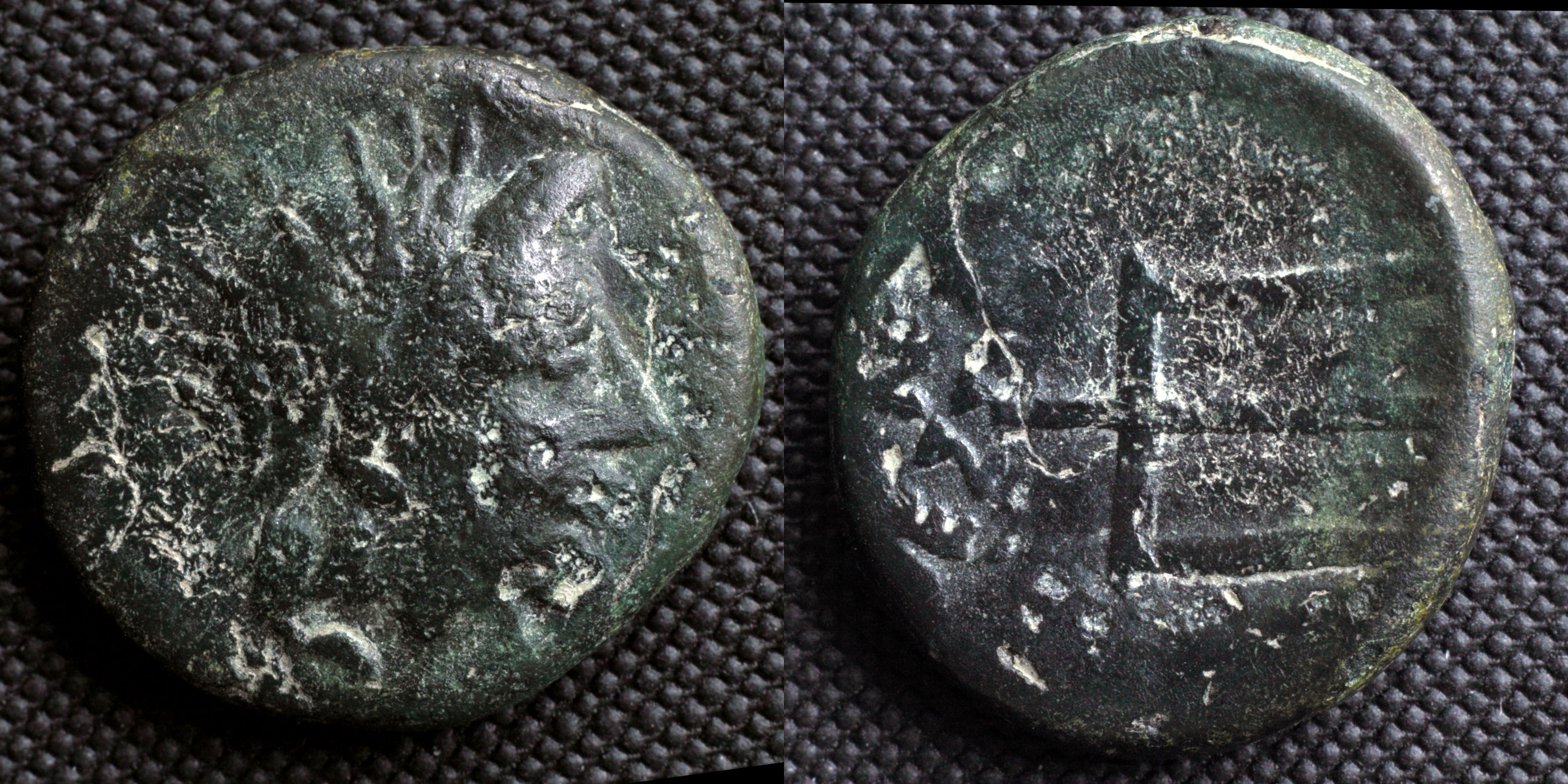
O: head of river-god Strymon R: trident This coin struck by Serdi tribe is an overstrike of the official Thessalonicean coin (187-31 BC) and imitates another Macedonian type. Imitations from Serdi region weren't used to fool Macedonian traders but as their own currency.

The Serdi were a Celtic tribe inhabiting Thrace. They settled around Serdica (modern-day Sofia, Bulgaria), in the place of the vanished Thracian tribes of the Treres and Tilataei. which reflects their ethnonym. They would have established themselves in this area during the Celtic migrations at the end of the 4th century BC, though there is no evidence of their existence before the 1st century BC. Serdi are among traditional tribal names reported into the Roman era. They were gradually Thracianized over the centuries but retained their Celtic character in material culture up to a late date, emerging as a mixed Thraco-Celtic tribe. According to other sources they may have been of Thracian origin.

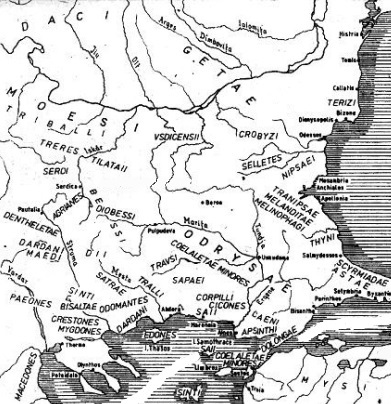
The migration of the Serdi to Thrace

== See also ==
- History of Sofia
- List of ancient tribes in Thrace and Dacia
