= Leandre le Gay =

French diplomat to Bulgaria

Leandre le Gay (in French: Léandre François René le Gay) (1833–1887) was a French diplomat (Vice Consul) in Sofia, Bulgaria during the April Uprising of 1876 and the Russo-Turkish War (1877–1878). He prevented the total burn down of the city of Sofia from the fleeing Ottoman troops.

== Early life and career ==
Born 11 September 1833 in Cuillé, he graduated in law in Rennes. He was a gifted student and learned foreign languages - English, Italian, Spanish, Turkish, Persian and others. He began his diplomatic career in Alexandria, then worked in the French missions in Tunisia and Jeddah.

== Relationship with Bulgaria ==
In October 1874 he was appointed to the Vice-Consulate in Sofia, Bulgaria, then in the Ottoman Empire. Le Gay is known for his support of the Bulgarian national cause and for his active assistance in saving Bulgarian revolutionaries.

In the first months of the Russo-Turkish War, Sofia became the main supply point of the Turkish army. Significant quantities of ammunition were stored there. After the defeat of the Turkish army in Orhaniye and the approach of the Russian army to the city, it was planned Sofia to be burned down (December 1877). Foreign diplomats were warned to evacuate, but instead Le Gay and the Italian Vice Consul Vittorio Positano organized the city's resistance and held successful talks with Turkish Force Commander Osman Nuri Pasha to keep the city from destruction. They succeeded in this endeavor and Sofia was not set on fire.

After the liberation of Bulgaria, he became one of the first honorary citizens of Sofia, by a decision of the city council from 26 May 1878.

Since 1878, one of the central streets in Sofia is named after Le Gay, with the Bulgarian pronunciation 'Lege'.

== Death ==
Le Gay died 13 February 1887 in the city of Jaffa.
