= History of the Jews in Sofia =

As per the 2021 Bulgarian census, the Jews in Sofia number around 901.

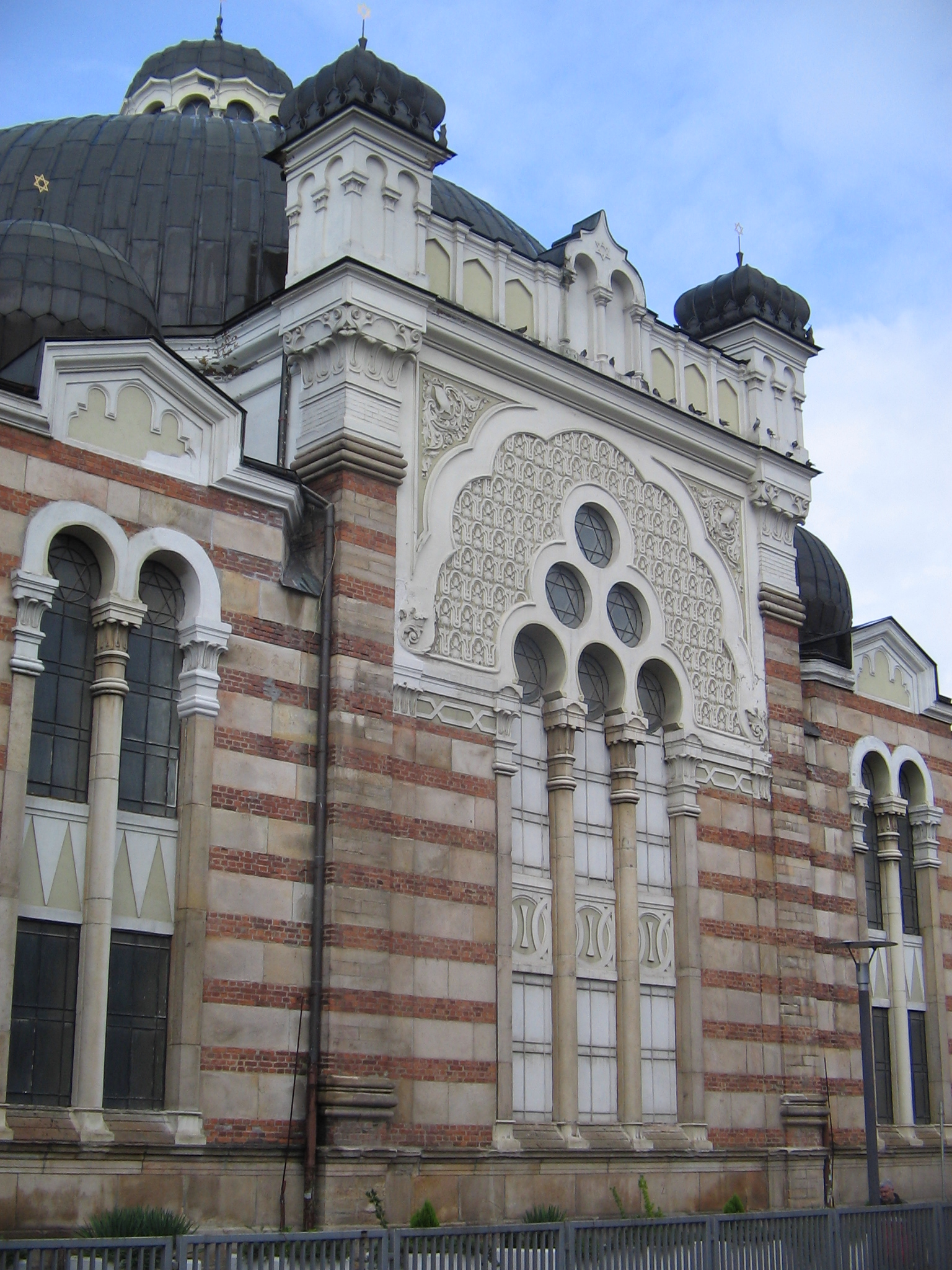
Sofia Synagogue, September 2005

Sofia had Jewish inhabitants before the ninth century; and in 811 the community was joined by coreligionists among the 30,000 prisoners whom the Bulgarian czar Krum brought with him on his return from an expedition against Thessaly, while a number of Jewish emigrants from the Byzantine Empire voluntarily settled in Sofia in 967.

In 1360 some Jews from the south of Germany established themselves in the city, and their number was augmented seven years later by Jews driven from Hungary. When Murad I. seized Sofia, about 1389, he found four synagogues, belonging respectively to the Byzantines ("ḳahal de los Gregos"), the Ashkenazim, the "Francos," or Italian Jews (especially those of Venice), and the native Jews. According to local statements, a Macedonian and a Maltese synagogue, founded at dates as yet unascertained, existed in Sofia up to the middle of the nineteenth century.

Early in the fifteenth century Joseph Satan was rabbi in Sofia, and some time before the immigration of the Spanish Jews the city had a yeshibah whose instructors included a chief rabbi, Meïr ha-Levi. In 1492 a number of Spanish Jews, chiefly from Castile and Aragon, settled at Sofia where they founded the Sephardic synagogue. In the second half of the sixteenth century Joseph Albo (1570) was chief rabbi of the city; in the seventeenth century the post was filled by several rabbis, two of whom, Ḥayyim Meborak Galipapa and Abraham Farḥi, are mentioned in letters of approbation. In 1666, during the incumbency of Abraham Farḥi, the false Messiah Sabbatai Zevi sent a letter from the prison of Abydos, inviting his "brethren of Sofia" to celebrate the Tisha B'Av, the anniversary of his birth, as a day of festivity and rejoicing. After the conversion of Shabbethai, his follower and successor, Nathan of Gaza, took refuge in Sofia, where he died, his body being interred at Uskub.

Issachar Abulafia and Reuben Behar Jacob were chief rabbis of Sofia toward the close of the eighteenth century. Issachar Abulafia (1770) was a son of the famous chief rabbi Ḥayyim Abulafia, the founder of the new community of Tiberias. Reuben Behar Jacob, called from Sofia to Safed, was succeeded by Abraham Ventura (about 1806). At the end of the eighteenth century the director of the yeshibah was Samuel Conforte, the author of the "Ḳol Shemu'el" (Salonica, 1787). In 1905, the occupant of the rabbinate was R. Ehrenpreis, who succeeded Moritz Grünwald.

Many trials befell the Sofia community in the nineteenth century. Had it not been for the intervention of the governor, the entire Jewish population would have been massacred in 1863, because three Jews who had been forcibly converted to Christianity had returned to their former religion. During the Turko-Russian war, less than fifteen years later, the city of Sofia was fired by the Turks when they evacuated the city, and was saved only by a volunteer fire-brigade formed by the Jews of both sexes. The Italian consul, Positano, publicly acknowledged the services of the Jews on this occasion.

At the time of the Treaty of Berlin, 1878, the Jews of Sofia declared their sympathy with Bulgaria, and a régime of liberty shortly began for them. In 1880, Prince Alexander of Battenberg appointed Gabriel Almosnino chief rabbi of Bulgaria, and in the following year, two Jews of Sofia, Abraham Behar David and Mordecai Behar Ḥayyim, were elected members of the municipal council. Notwithstanding this, at Easter in 1884 and again in 1885, accusations of ritual murder were brought against the Jews, although the falsity of the charges was quickly discovered. In 1890, the municipality of Sofia granted to the poor of the city some land in Outch-Bounar, one of the suburbs; three hundred Jewish families were benefited by this concession.

Sofia is the seat of the chief rabbinate of Bulgaria and of the Central Consistory.

The Alliance Israélite Universelle supported three schools — two for boys (855 pupils) and one for girls (459 pupils).

Except for an old cemetery, in which a few ancient inscriptions are still legible, Sofia has no permanent memorial of its remote Jewish past.

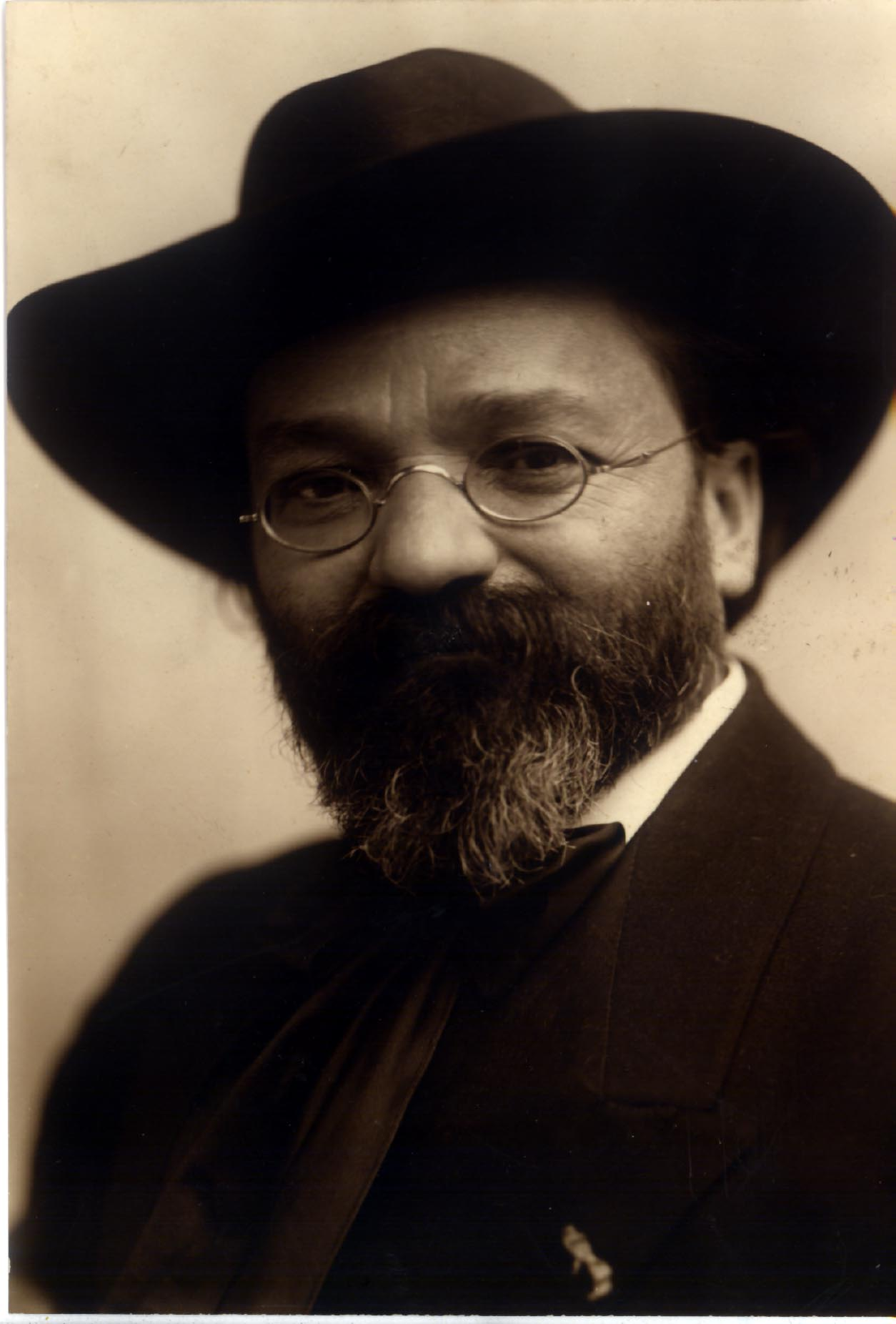
Boris Schatz

Several Jews of Sofia filled public offices: Albert Caleb was minister of foreign affairs; Albert Behar was translator for the minister of finances; and Boucos Baruk was secretary and interpreter for the French legation. Boris Schatz, a Jew of Russian extraction, won a high reputation as a sculptor; one of his works, "Mattathias Maccabeus," was in the gallery of Ferdinand of Bulgaria. Two Judaeo-Spanish journals ware published at Sofia — "La Verdad" and "El Eco Judaico," the latter being a semimonthly bulletin and the organ of the Central Consistory. There were several benevolent and educational societies there, including the Zionist Society, the Women's Society, and the students' society Ha-Shaḥar.

Since 1887, a charitable society for the purpose of aiding poor Jewish youths through apprenticeships to various trades has been in operation, under the control of the Alliance Israélite Universelle.
