= Amphitheatre of Serdica =

Ancient Roman amphitheater in Sofia, Bulgaria

- Amphitheatrum Serdicense (Latin)
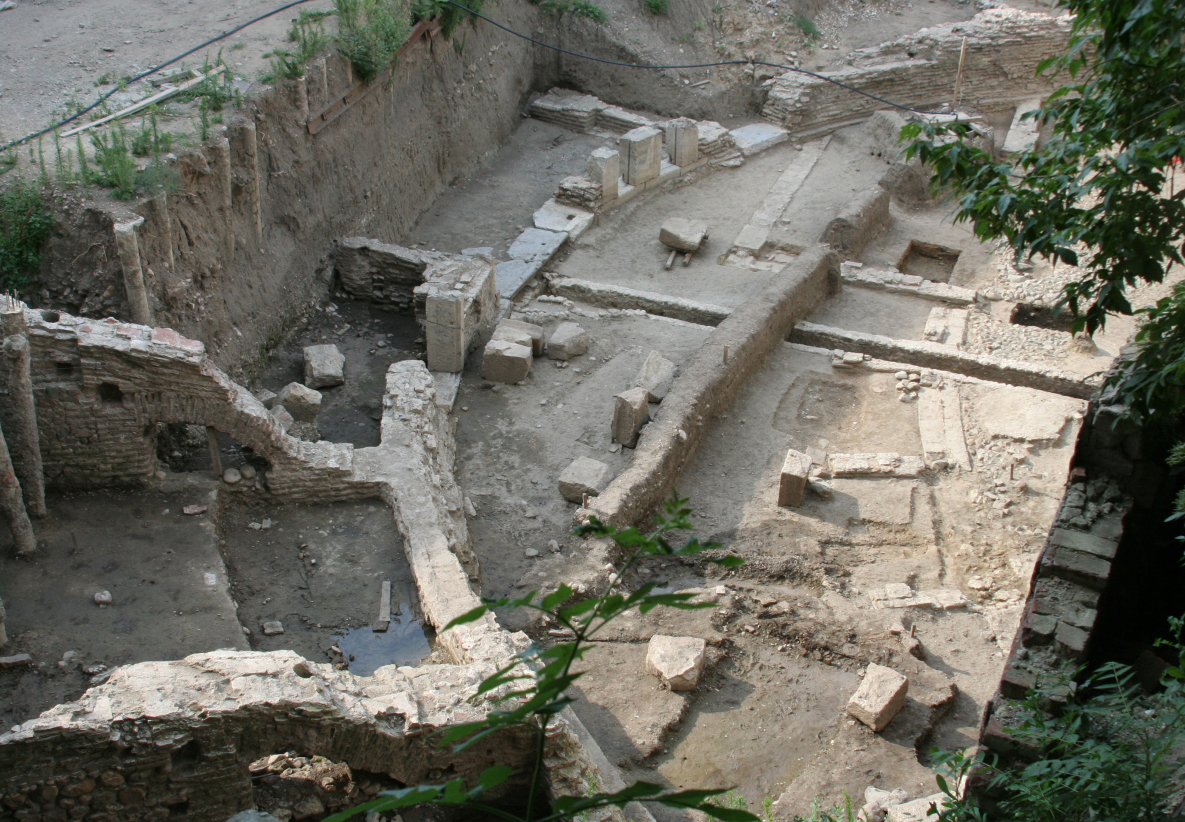
- The second section of unearthed ruins

- Location within Bulgaria
- 42°41′50″N 23°19′42″E
- Type: Roman amphitheatre
- Periods: Roman Empire
- Location: Sofia, Bulgaria.

History
- Built: 3rd–4th century AD

Site notes
- Excavation dates: 2004

The Amphitheatre of Serdica (Latin: Amphitheatrum Serdicense; Bulgarian: Амфитеатър на Сердика, romanized: Amfiteatar na Serdika) was an amphitheatre in the Ancient Roman city of Ulpia Serdica, now Sofia, the capital of Bulgaria. Discovered in 2004 and the subject of excavations in 2005 and 2006, the ruins of the amphitheatre lie on two adjacent sites in the centre of modern Sofia. The amphitheatre was built in the 3rd–4th century AD on top of a 2nd–3rd century theatre, which had been ravaged by the Goths. However, the amphitheatre remained in use for less than a century and was abandoned by the 5th century.

The Amphitheatre of Serdica was among the biggest in the eastern part of the Roman Empire and the largest in what is today Bulgaria. It lay outside the city walls of Serdica and hosted fights between gladiators and wild beasts, which were advertised at the entrance of the city.

== History ==
The Amphitheatre of Serdica was built on top of an earlier Roman theatre, which was constructed in the 2nd or 3rd century CE. Its ruins were discovered 5 metres (16 ft) under the amphitheatre ruins.

The theatre, 55 m (180 ft) wide, was perhaps built simultaneously with Serdica's defensive walls under Commodus (r. 177–192). It was active during the reigns of Septimius Severus (r. 193–211) and Caracalla (r. 198–217); the former may have visited the theatre with his family in 202 or 209. In the first half of 268, however, a Gothic raid ravaged and burned the theatre, forcing its permanent abandonment.

As evidenced by coin and ceramic findings, including a rare bronze medallion of Antinous, the amphitheatre was constructed on top of the theatre ruins in two stages during the late 3rd and early 4th century CE, under Roman emperors Diocletian (r. 284–305) and Constantine the Great (r. 306–337).

The amphitheatre itself was in use for less than a century, as it was abandoned by the 5th century, perhaps due to the anti-pagan policies of Theodosius I (r. 379–395). In the 5th and 6th centuries, barbarian invaders set up their homes within the former arena, and during the Ottoman period (late 14th–19th centuries), it was used as a source of building materials for new housing.

== Discovery ==
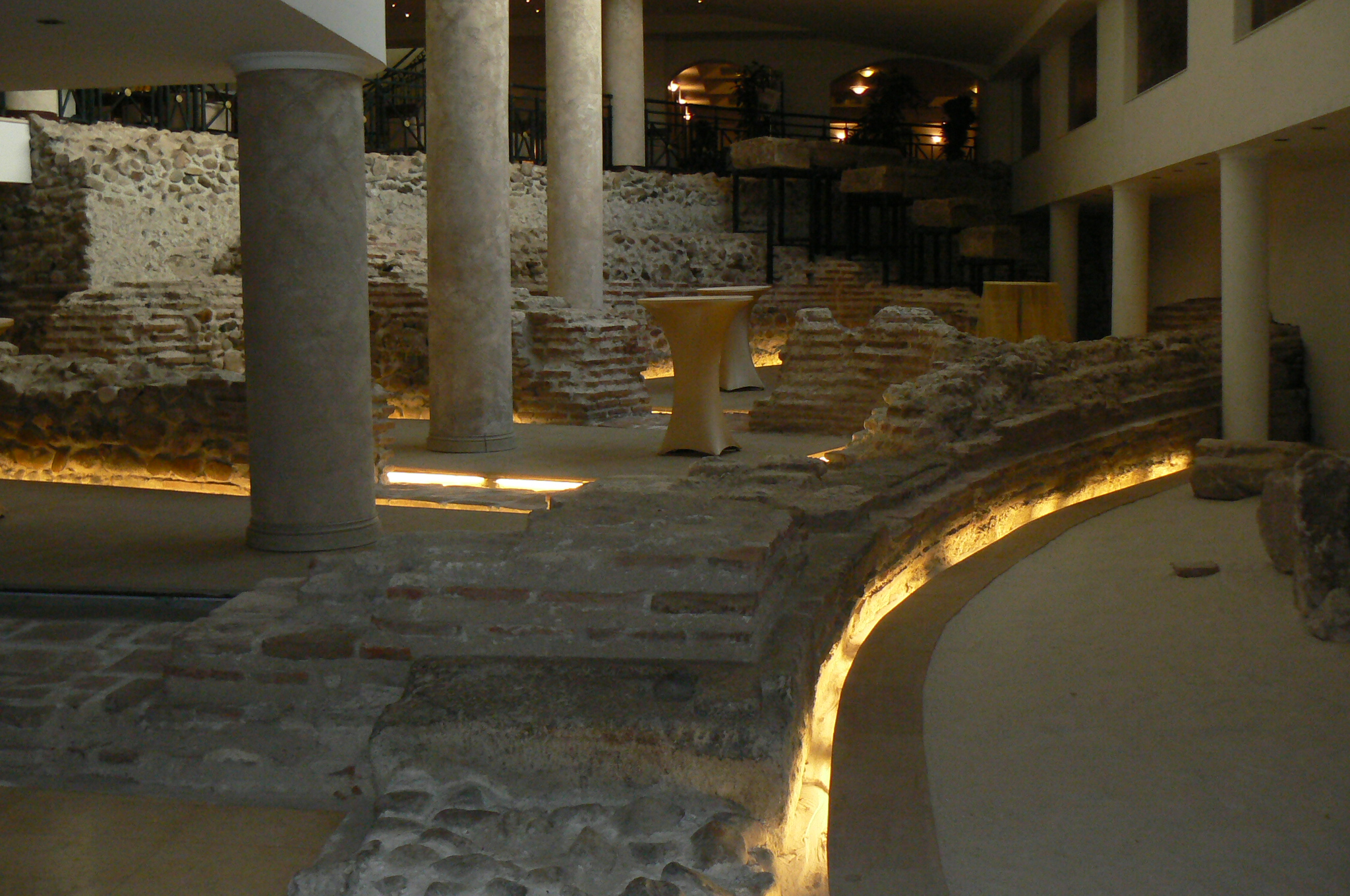
Amphitheatre remains inside the Arena di Serdica hotel, a pastiche of classicism.

The existence of a Roman amphitheatre in ancient Serdica had been conjectured ever since 1919, when a stone plate depicting an amphitheatre's façade and fights between gladiators and wild animals was unearthed near what is today the Council of Ministers of Bulgaria edifice. The plate shows crocodiles, bears, bulls, and wild cats as involved in the fights. It is thought to have stood at the entrance of Roman Serdica, so as to serve as advertisement for these events. The plate is currently displayed in the National Archaeological Institute with Museum of Bulgaria in the same city.

In 2004, the amphitheatre itself was accidentally discovered during the early construction of what came to be known as the Arena di Serdica Hotel. In the modern cityscape of Sofia, the ruins lie south of Knyaz Aleksandar Dondukov Boulevard, between the Goethe-Institut headquarters and the embassy of the United Kingdom.

In July 2006, digging of the foundations of a National Electric Company office building in the vicinity came across further parts of the arena. The eastern entrance and the section of the amphitheatre within the hotel lot, which is about a sixth of the entire building, was preserved and incorporated into the hotel's ground floor. It is freely accessible for tourists during the day, except on Mondays, and includes a small expositions of coins and ceramics unearthed on the site.

In 2007, the western entrance and the adjacent part of the amphitheatre was excavated at the National Electric Company lot. A campaign began to prevent the construction of the planned building on the site.

== Physical description ==
With its original dimensions of 60.5 m × 43 m (198 ft × 141 ft), the central arena of the Amphitheatre of Serdica is commonly cited as having been some 10 m (33 ft) smaller than the Colosseum in the imperial capital Rome. This is false, however, since the Colosseum measures 87 by 55 metres (285 ft × 180 ft), and many other amphitheatres are larger than Serdica's. Furthermore, the Colosseum's exterior dimensions were far larger (see List of Roman amphitheatres).

The Amphitheatre was much larger than two other Roman amphitheatres in modern Bulgaria, at Diocletianopolis (Hisarya) and Marcianopolis (Devnya). In terms of architecture, the amphitheatre was comparable to the Arènes de Lutèce in modern Paris, France, and was designed for a maximum attendance of more than 20,000 up to around 25,000. Like arenas in the Mediterranean region, the Amphitheatre of Serdica has an east–west orientation. It lay outside the city walls of Serdica.

The stand for high-ranking Roman officials lay in the southern section of the amphitheatre, near what is today the National Art Gallery. The amphitheatre featured two main gates, from the west and the east, linked by an underground water canal. The west gate, which reaches 3.5 m (11 ft) in width, is estimated to have been topped by an arch 5 m (16 ft) in height. Among the excavated and preserved ruins are the main entrance, the underground level, part of the main section with at least seven spectator seats, and gates with sliding doors to let animals into the arena. The opus mixtum construction technique was employed in the construction of at least a part of the amphitheatre. Items discovered during the amphitheatre excavations include bear and boar bones, hundreds of bronze coins and clay stones imprinted with the footprints of goats, dogs, and cats.

== See also ==
- History of Sofia
- Hagia Sophia Church (Sofia)
- Dacia Aureliana
- List of Roman amphitheatres
