= Vito Positano =

Italian diplomat

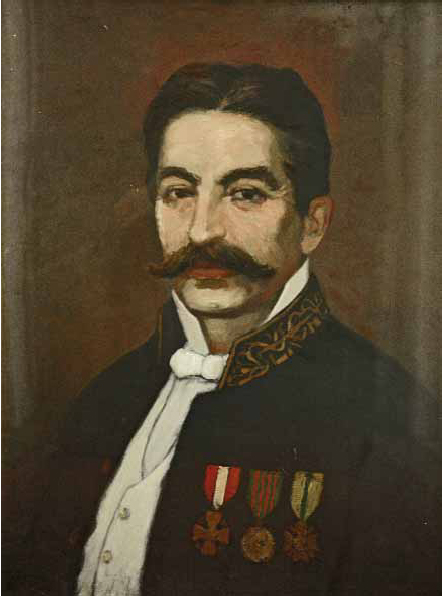
- Portrait of Vito Positano exhibited in the Italian Embassy in Sofia

Personal details
- Education: University of Bari
- Occupation: Diplomat

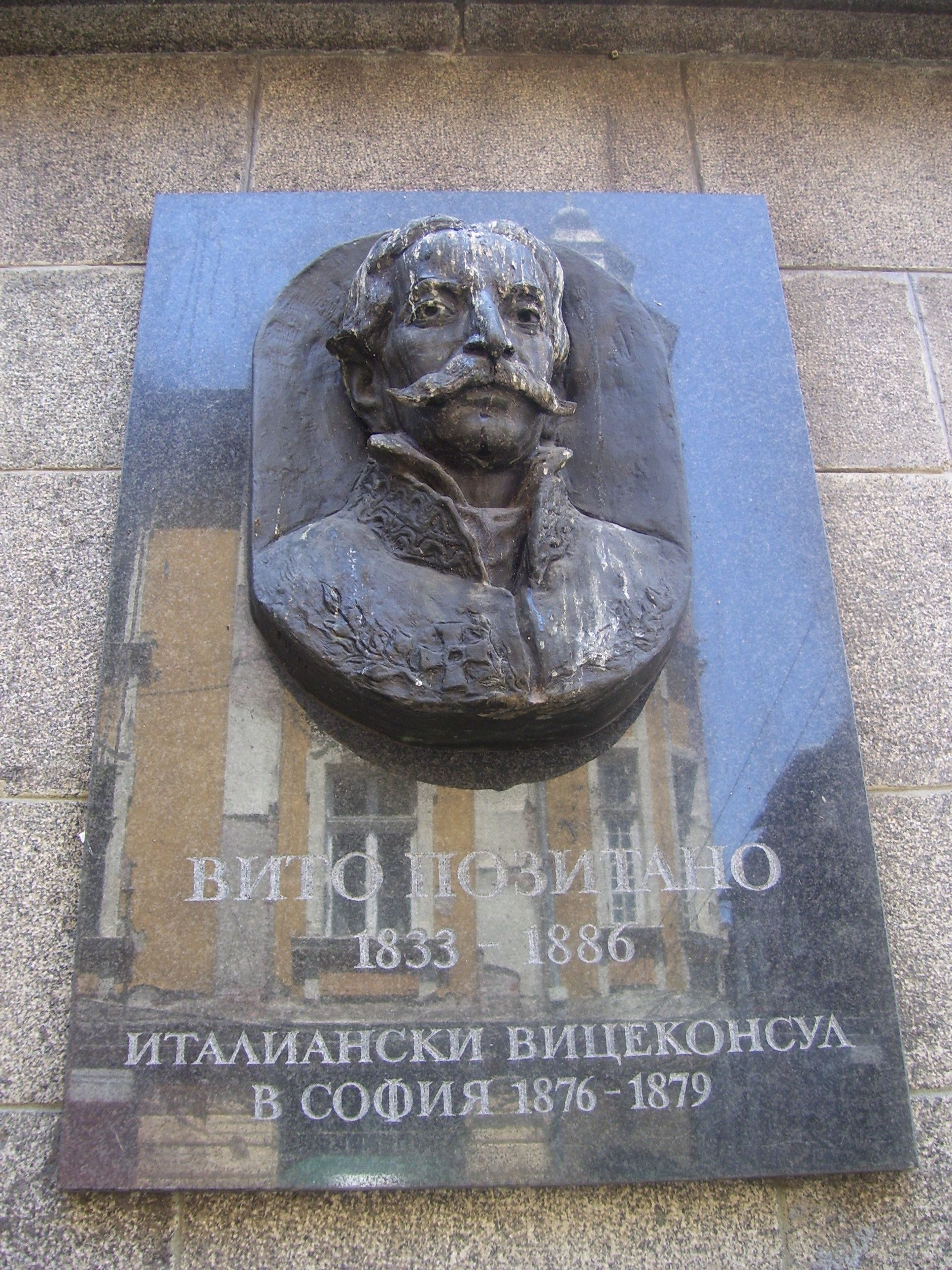
Commemorative plaque to Vito Positano on Positano Street in Sofia

Vittorio "Vito" Positano, (2 October 1833 – 26 November 1886) was an Italian diplomat known for saving the Bulgarian capital city of Sofia from burning during the Russo-Turkish War (1877–1878).

== Biography ==
Positano was born in the Southern Italian city of Noicattaro, formerly Noja, Province of Bari, then part of the Kingdom of the Two Sicilies. He held a law degree from University of Bari. He enlisted in the kingdom's army and was promoted to the rank of Captain for his participation in the crushing of local brigandage. After his service in the army, he joined the Bari fire brigade. According to some accounts, Positano was a follower of Giuseppe Garibaldi and participated in the Italian unification (Risorgimento).

After the establishment of the Kingdom of Italy in 1861, Positano joined the diplomatic branch of the Ministry of Foreign Affairs in Rome in 1863. He was at first a diplomatic agent in Trieste in the Austrian Empire; he later held various posts in Italian consulates, mainly in the Ottoman Empire. He served in Corfu, Malta, Algeria and Constantinople. In 1876, he was appointed Vice Consul in Sofia.

As Joseph Gurko's forces approached the Ottoman-controlled city during the Russo-Turkish War, Positano, together with the French Vice Consul Leandre le Gay and the Austro–Hungarian Vice Consul, refused to leave Sofia, thus saving it from the planned burning by the Ottoman defending forces. After the Ottoman retreat, Positano organized armed detachments to protect the population from marauders (regular Ottoman Army deserters, bashi-bazouks and Circassians) and a fire brigade to put out individual fires; this was the first fire brigade in Sofia's history. For his deeds during the war, Positano received an order from the Russian Empire and was made honorary citizen of Sofia, the capital of the newly established autonomous Principality of Bulgaria. He remained Italian Vice Consul in Sofia until 1879.

In 1881, Positano was sent to Damascus to serve as Consul; in a few years he was dispatched to Yokohama, Japan, where he died in 1886.

Streets in his native town and the Bulgarian capital Sofia have been named after Positano. The one in Sofia is particularly known for the address, 20 Positano Street, headquarters of the Bulgarian Socialist Party.

== See also ==
- Ministry of Foreign Affairs (Italy)
- Foreign relations of Italy
