= Tilataei =

Thracian tribe

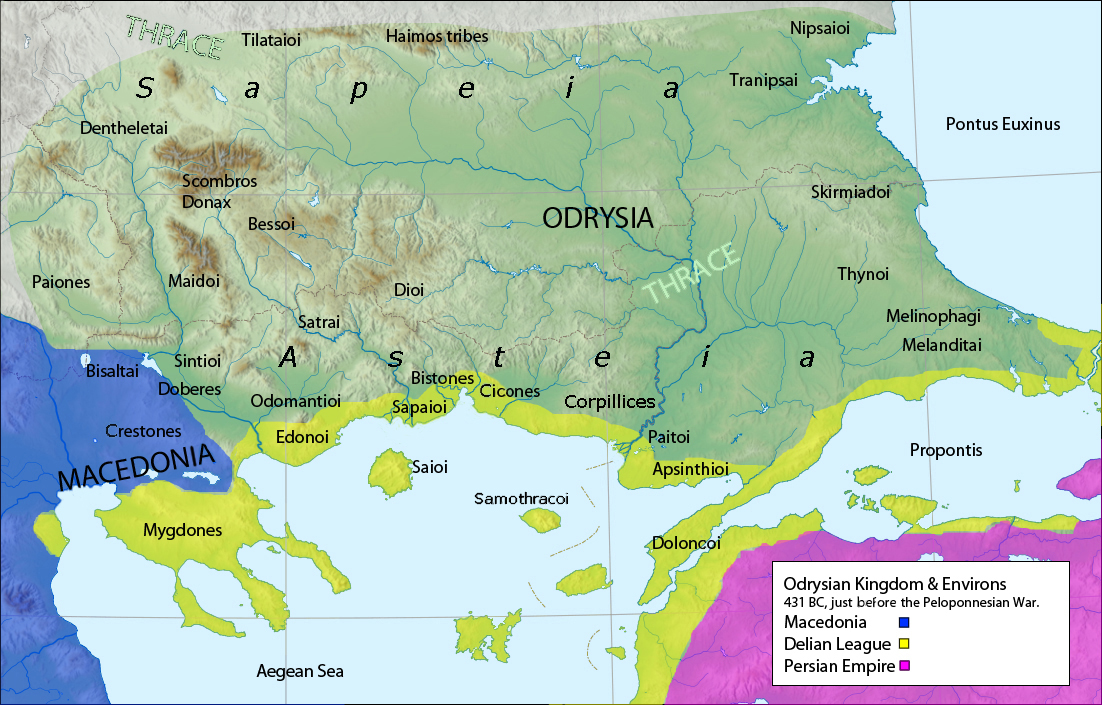
Approximate location of the Tilataioi

Tilataei (Greek: "Τιλαταίοι") is the name of a Thracian tribe that was located in Serdica. They are mentioned by Thucydides.

== See also ==
- List of Thracian tribes
