= Edict of Serdica =

Edict ending the Diocletianic persecution of Christianity in the East of the Roman Empire

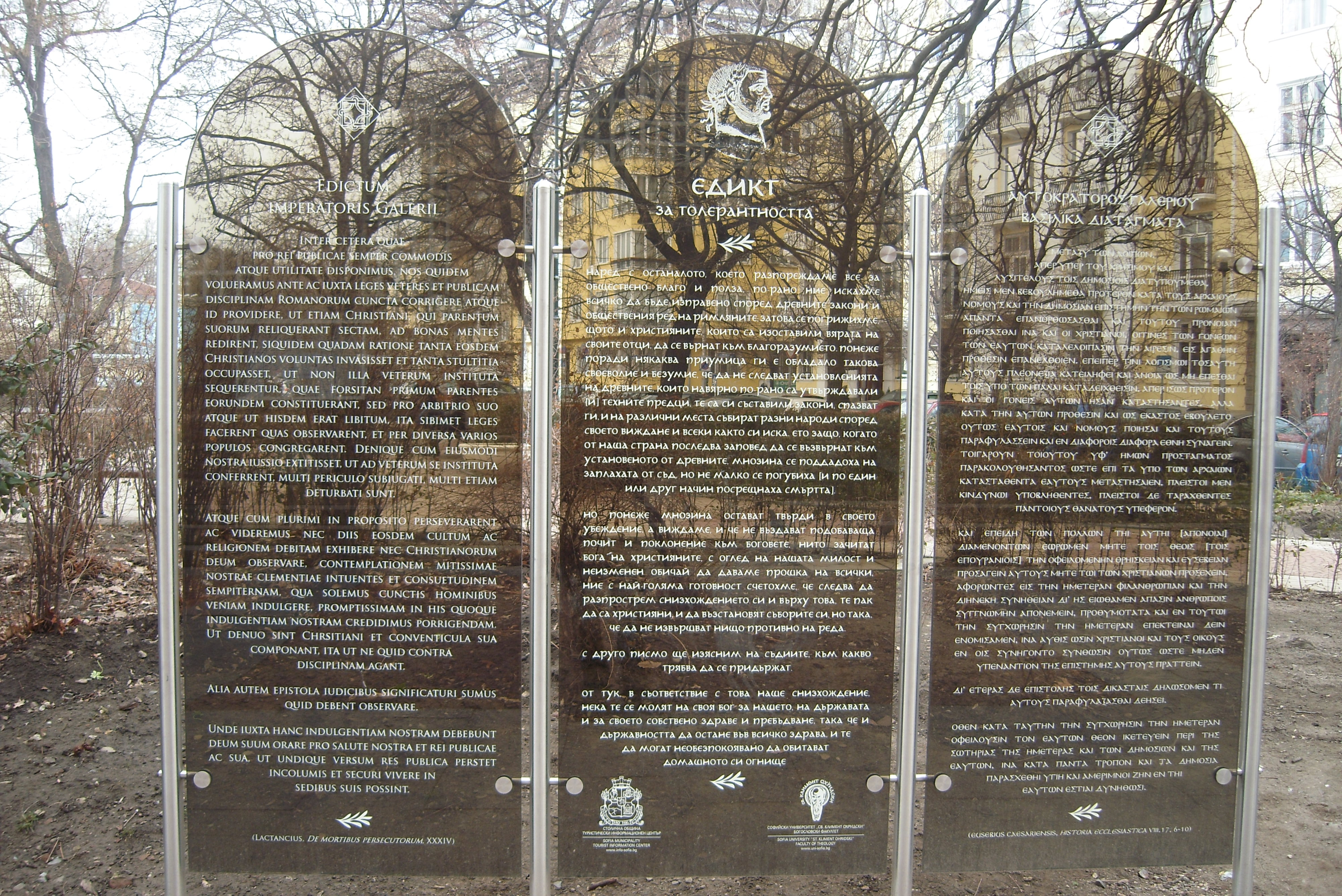
Trilingual (Latin, Bulgarian, Greek) plaque with the Edict in front of the St. Sofia Church, Sofia, Bulgaria.

The Edict of Serdica, also called Edict of Toleration by Galerius, was issued in 311 in Serdica (now Sofia, Bulgaria) by Roman Emperor Galerius. It officially ended the Diocletianic Persecution of Christianity in the Eastern Roman Empire.

The Edict implicitly granted Christianity the status of religio licita, a worship that was recognized and accepted by the Roman Empire. It was the first edict legalizing Christianity and preceded the Edict of Milan by two years.

== History ==
On 23 February 303, on the Terminalia feast, Emperor Diocletian, on the proposal of Galerius, issued a persecutory edict. The edict prescribed:

- Destroying churches and burning their Holy Scriptures
- Confiscation of church property
- Banning Christians from undertaking collective legal action
- Loss of privileges for Christians of high rank who refused to recant
- Arresting some state officials.

In 305, Diocletian abdicated and was replaced by Galerius, his successor, who continued persecution in the East until 311, when he granted Christians forgiveness, freedom of worship and (implicitly) the status of religio licita.

== Full text ==
Promulgated in the name of the other official members of the Tetrarchy, the edict marked the end of persecutions against the Christians.

Among other arrangements which we are always accustomed to make for the prosperity and welfare of the republic, we had desired formerly to bring all things into harmony with the ancient laws and public order of the Romans, and to provide that even the Christians who had left the religion of their fathers should come back to reason; since, indeed, the Christians themselves, for some reason, had followed such a caprice and had fallen into such a folly that they would not obey the institutes of antiquity, which perchance their own ancestors had first established; but at their own will and pleasure, they would thus make laws unto themselves which they should observe and would collect various peoples in diverse places in congregations. Finally when our law had been promulgated to the effect that they should conform to the institutes of antiquity, many were subdued by the fear of danger, many even suffered death. And yet since most of them persevered in their determination, and we saw that they neither paid the reverence and awe due to the gods, nor yet worship their own God, therefore we, in view of our most mild clemency and the constant habit by which we are accustomed to grant indulgence to all, we thought that we ought to grant our most prompt indulgence also to these, so that they may again be Christians and may hold their conventicles, provided they do nothing contrary to good order. But we shall tell the magistrates in another letter what they ought to do.

Wherefore, for this our indulgence, they ought to pray to their God for our safety, for that of the republic, and for their own, that the republic may continue uninjured on every side, and that they may be able to live securely in their homes.

This edict is published at Nicomedia on the day before the Kalends of May, in our eighth consulship and the second of Maximinus.

— Lactantius, De Mort. Pers. ch. 34, 35. Opera, ed. O. F. Fritzsche, II, P. 273. (Bibl. Patt. Ecc. Lat. XI, Leipzig, 1844.), https://people.ucalgary.ca/~vandersp/Courses/texts/lactant/lactperf.html
