= Vitosha, Sofia =

District in Sofia, Bulgaria

- Interactive map of Vitosha, Sofia
- Coordinates: 42°39′14″N 23°15′5″E

Vitosha (Bulgarian: Витоша [ˈvitoʃɐ]) is one of the 24 districts of Sofia, situated in the southern parts of the City on the foot of the Vitosha mountain. As of 2006 it has 42,953 inhabitants. The district includes 7 neighbourhoods: Boyana, Simeonovo, Dragalevtsi, Pavlovo, Buxton, Manastirski Livadi, and Knyazhevo as well as two villages Vladaya and Marchaevo. It is among the richest and greenest districts in Sofia and Bulgaria with many beautiful residences, houses, villas and residential complexes.

== Landmarks ==
- National Historical Museum which is among the most important European museums with rich collection dating from prehistorical ages to modern day. Among the most precious items are several splendid Thracian treasures, fine church plates, ancient manuscripts and many others. It is part of the 100 Tourist Sites of Bulgaria.
- Boyana Church dating back to the 9-10th century with magnificent 13th-century frescoes. It is a UNESCO World Heritage Site and part of the 100 Tourist Sites of Bulgaria.
- Boyana Waterfall, a 15 m high waterfall.
- Dragalevtsi Monastery, built under Ivan Alexander.
- Knyazhevo mineral springs, with a temperature of 31 °C

== Education ==
There are 8 schools and 7 chitalishta (something like a library) with 102,000 volumes.

The Lycée Français Victor Hugo, a French international school, is in the Maxi Complex in Vitosha.

== Gallery ==
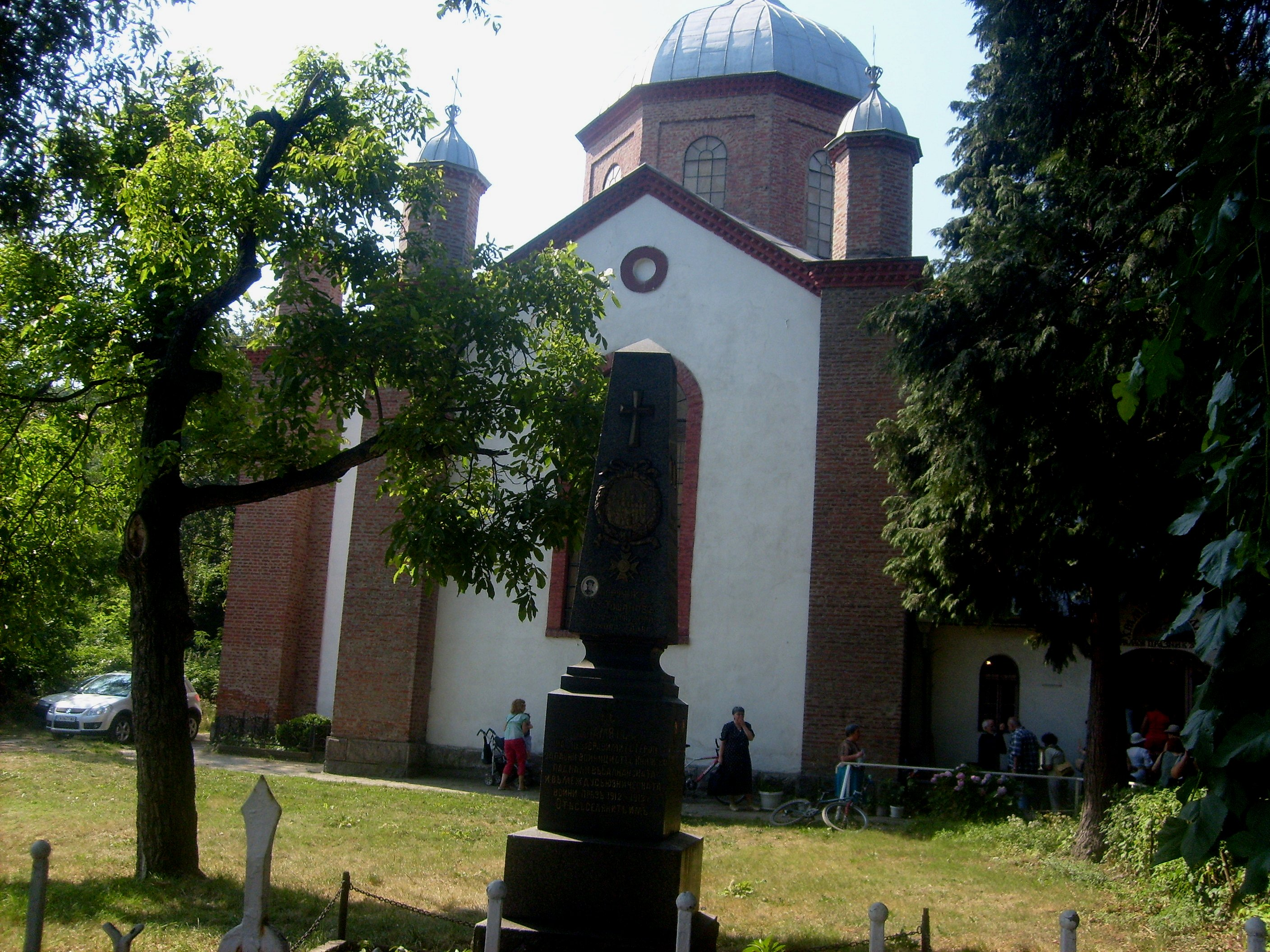
Church in Knyazhevo

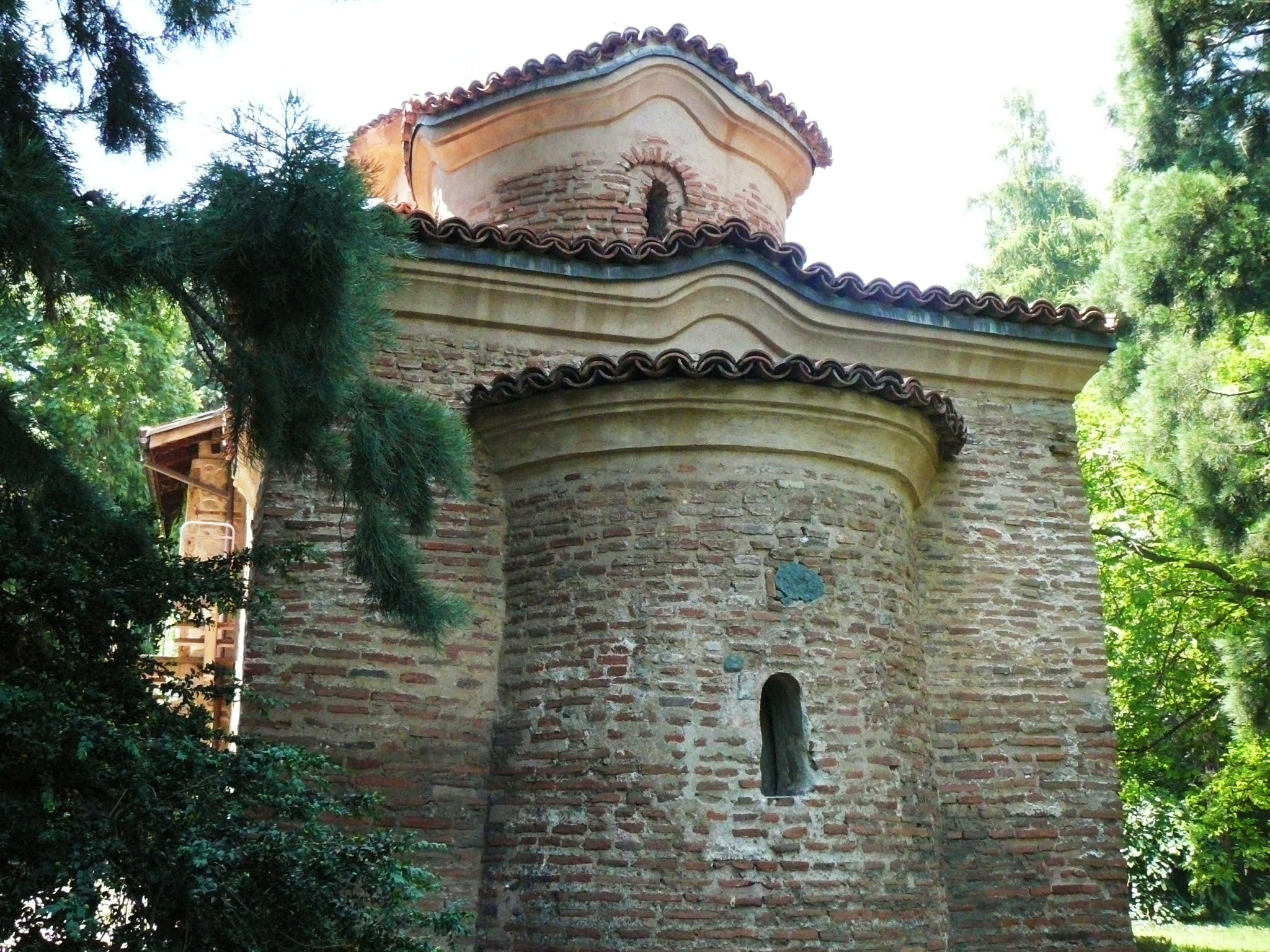
Boyana Church
