= Pavlovo, Sofia =

Southern neighbourhood of Sofia, Bulgaria

Coordinates: 42°39′46″N 23°16′6″E

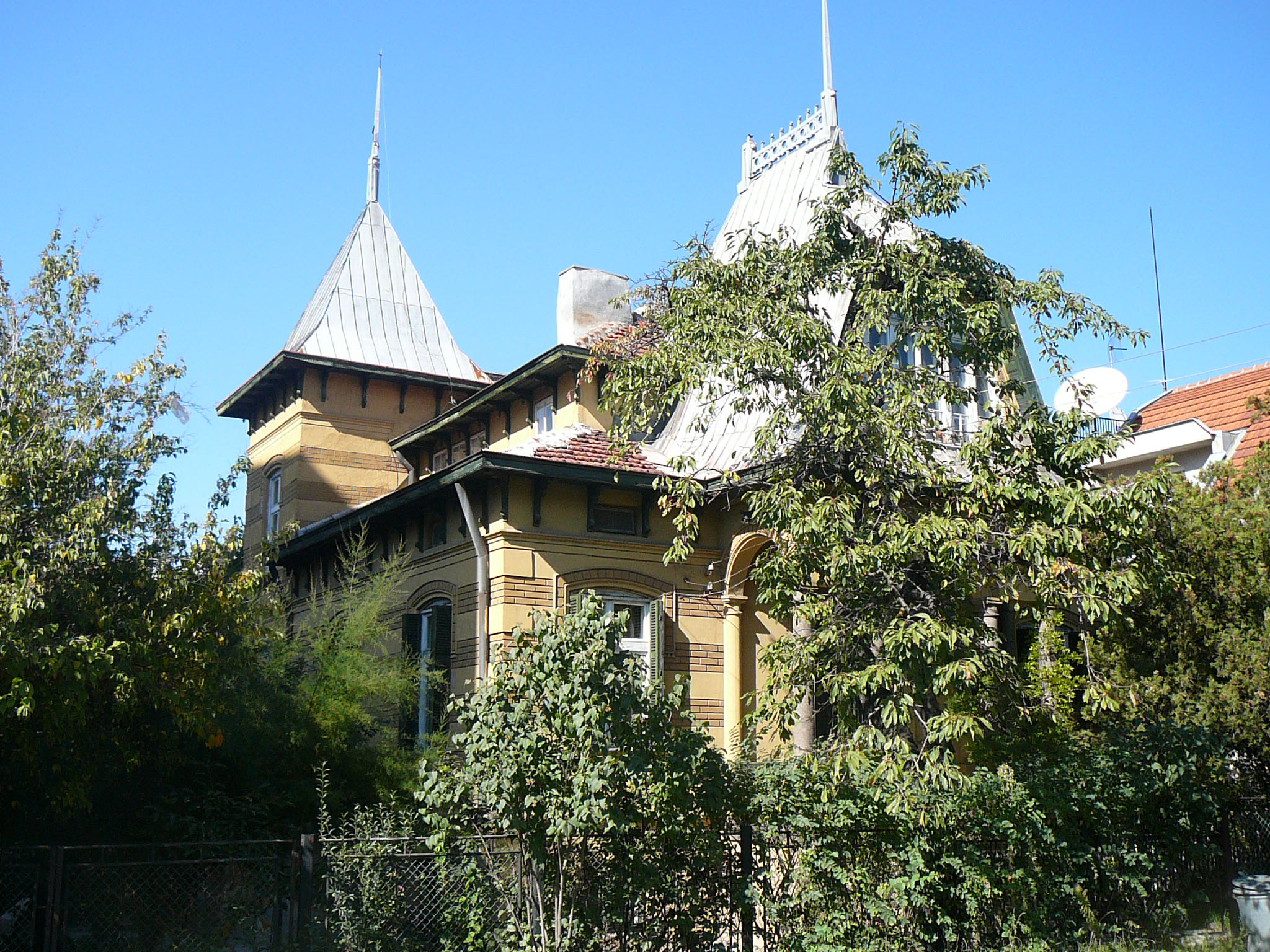
Old house in Pavlovo

Pavlovo (Bulgarian: Павлово) is a southern neighbourhood of Sofia, the capital of Bulgaria. Part of the Vitosha municipality, it borders Buxton Neighbourhood to the northeast and Boyana to the south. Its area is roughly triangular, encompassed by three large avenues: Tsar Boris III Boulevard to the northwest, the Sofia ringroad (in this section known as the Nikola Petkov Boulevard) to the south, and the Buxton Boulevard to the east.

Pavlovo started developing at the end of the 19th c. when a brewery was built at what became its north-western end. Today Pavlovo still features mostly low – to mid-rise residential architecture, with houses and small blocks of flats dominating the skyline but a part of it was covered by a sprawling block building complex during the seventies. The local school was founded in 1921 and it is still active. The home of the historian Ivan Duichev (1907–1986) has become a Centre for Slavo-Byzantine Studies “Prof. Ivan Dujčev” .

== Gallery ==
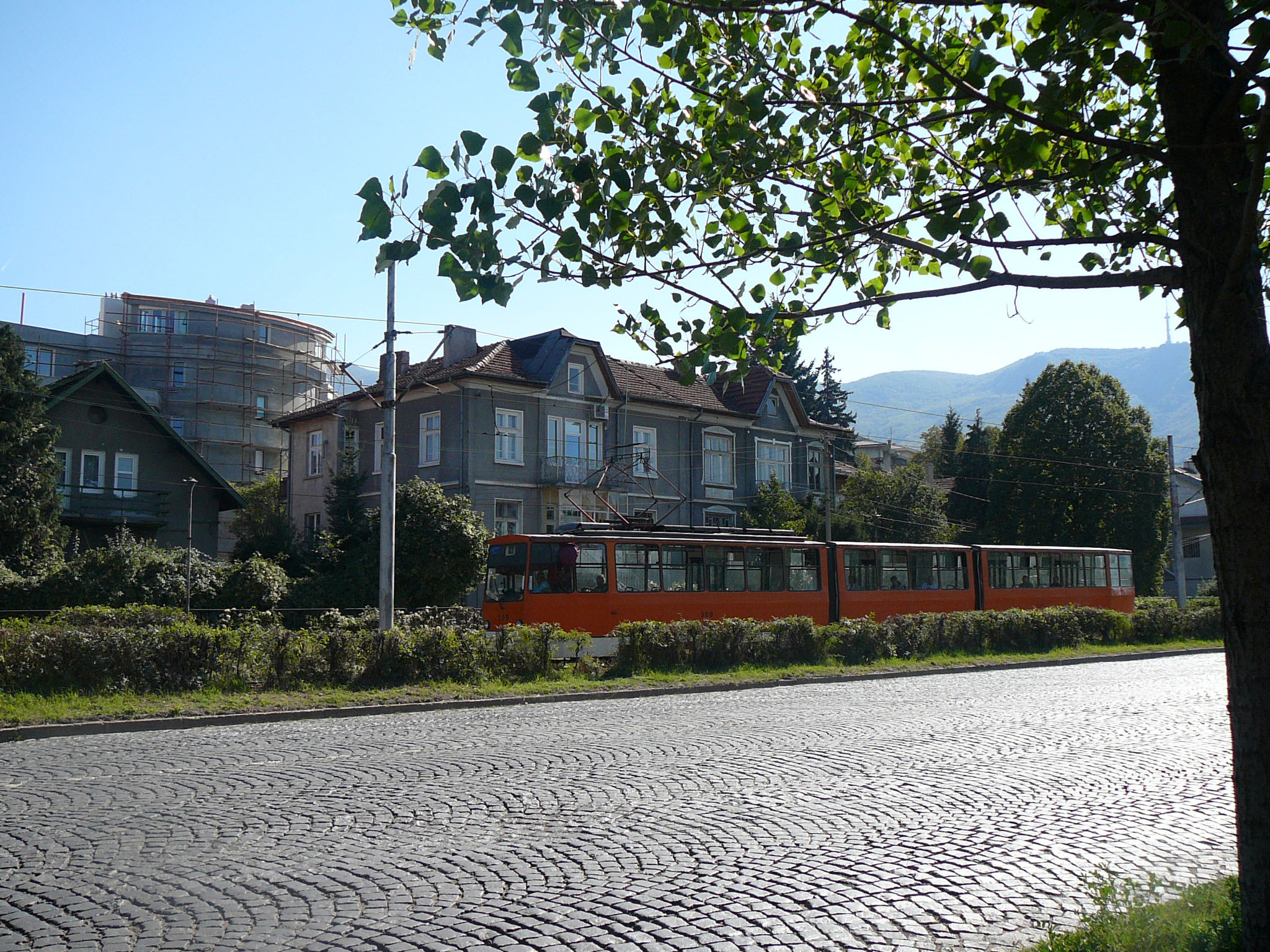
Pavlovo along Tsar Boris III Boulevard

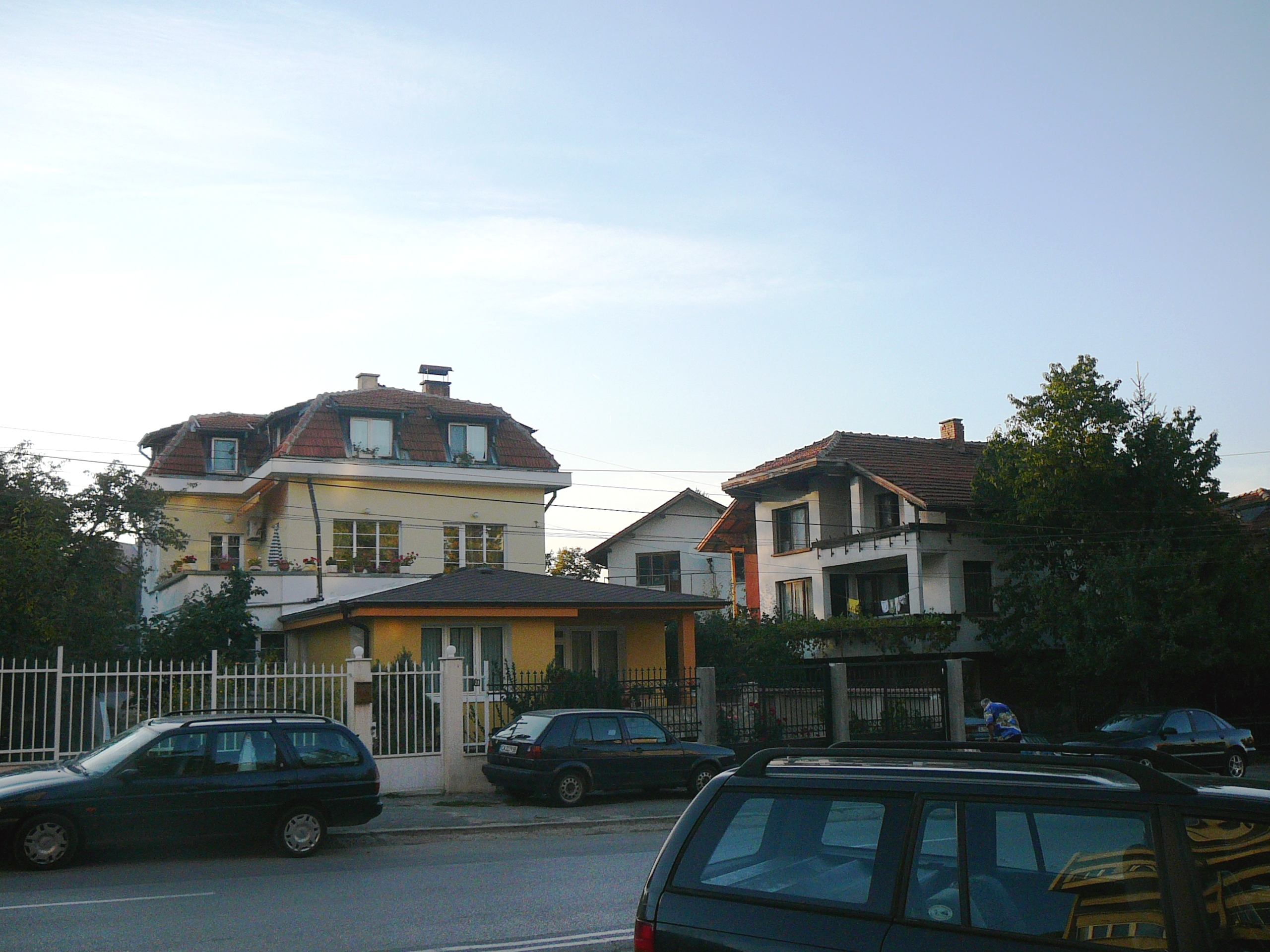
Pavlovo

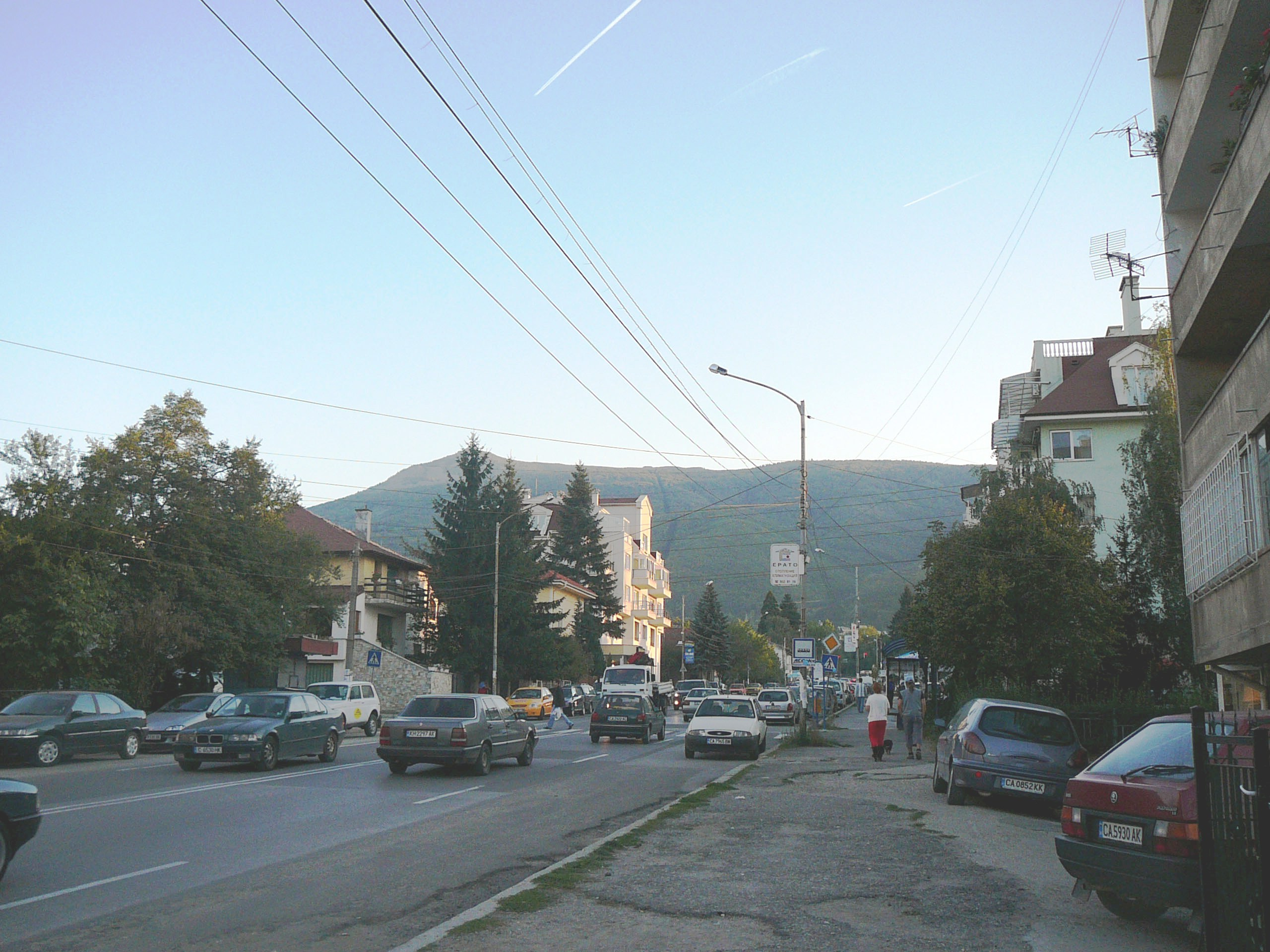
View of Vitosha from Pavlovo along the Alexander Pushkin Boulevard
