= Boyana Lake =

Lake in Bulgaria

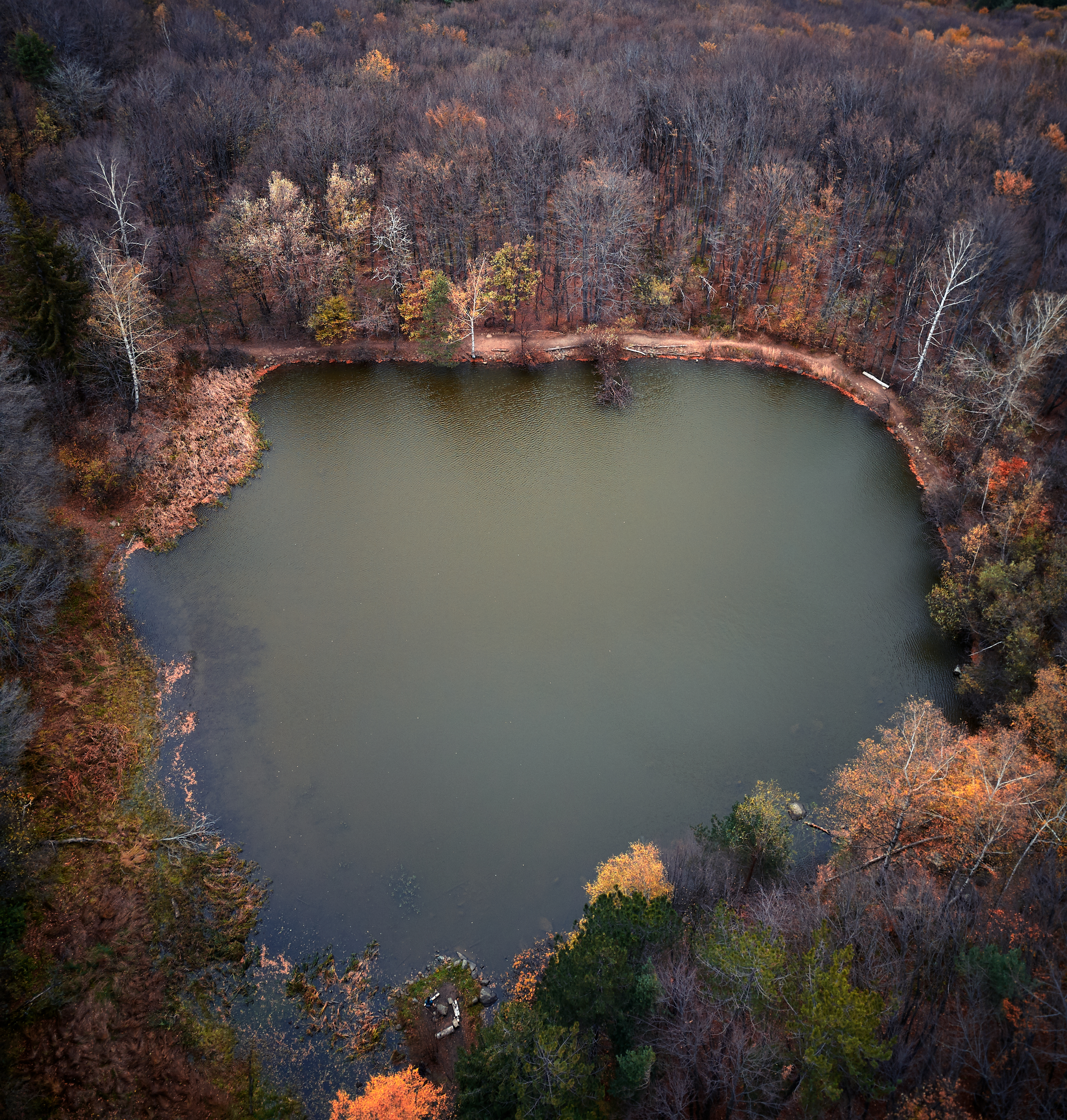
- Boyana Lake aerial view

- Location within Bulgaria
- Coordinates: 42.635556°N 23.269167°E
- Settlements: Sofia

Boyana Lake is an artificial lake in Vitosha mountain near the capital of Bulgaria - Sofia. It is located 1.5 km Southeast from Sofia's Boyana neighborhood.

Initially the boyana lake was a pond. It was later transformed into a lake with the establishment of the Vitosha aqueduct over Sofia in 1906. In the Vitosha lake you can find true toads from the family Bufonidae, true frogs from the family Ranidae, and Northern crested newts, a type of Salamandridae. The lake has an area of approximately 2000 square meters, and is located at 1027 meters altitude above sea level.

== Location ==
The Boyana lake can be reached within 40 minutes of hiking with average speed from the Boyana district of Sofia. There are two trails from the lake, leading to Boyana waterfall and Boyana church. There is another trail leading to Suhi Vrah, a peak in Vitosha mountain at an altitude of 1700 meters. The Boyana Lake is situated in the beginning of Vitosha Natural Park, a protected area in Vitosha mountain.

The Lake has been announced as part of the European Natural Heritage in Bulgaria.
