= Kaloyan and Desislava =

- Sebastocrators of Sredets (Sofia)
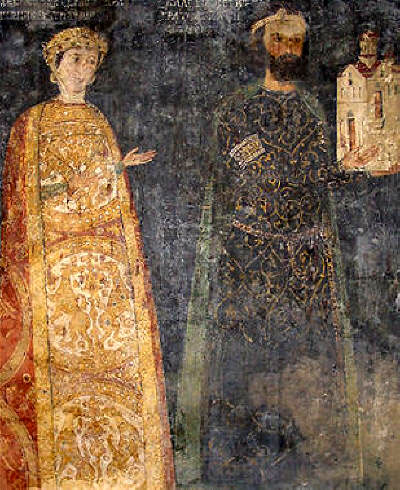
- Reign: 13th century
- Issue: see below
- House: Asen

Kaloyan (Bulgarian: Калоян; Old Bulgarian: КАЛѠѢНЪ, Kalōjěnŭ) and Desislava (Bulgarian: Десислава; Old Bulgarian: ДЕСИСЛАВА, Desislava) were 13th-century Bulgarian nobles, sebastocrators of Sredets (Sofia) and the surrounding region during the Asen dynasty of the Second Bulgarian Empire. They are credited as main donors and patrons of the Boyana Church. Their portraits, created in 1259 by the painters of Tarnovo Artistic School in Boyana Church, are considered by many leading experts as the first Renaissance images in European art Many art historians defined these frescoes as one of the most remarkable works of the Palaeologan Renaissance.

== Life ==
Kaloyan may have been the grandson of Tsar Ivan Asen I (1189–1196) from his younger son sebastocrator Alexander, as he is mentioned as a cousin of Tsar Constantine Tih (1257–1277); however, his relation to the royal family may have been merely titular. Kaloyan was an opponent of Tsar Michael Asen I's (1246–1256) pro-Byzantine policy and took part in the plot against him.

Desislava is also a noble of Asen dynasty.

Kaloyan and Desislava are mainly known as the main donors of the Boyana Church, a medieval Eastern Orthodox church in Boyana, Sofia. An inscription from 1259 in the church describes Kaloyan's role in its construction; he is also referred to as a grandson of the Serbian king Saint Stephen.

It has been theorized that Kaloyan reconstructed Roman Emperor Constantine I's palace in Sofia and used it as his city residence. Two other small churches in Sofia, St. Petka the Old and St. Nicholas, have also been attributed to his donorship.

== Boyana frescoes ==
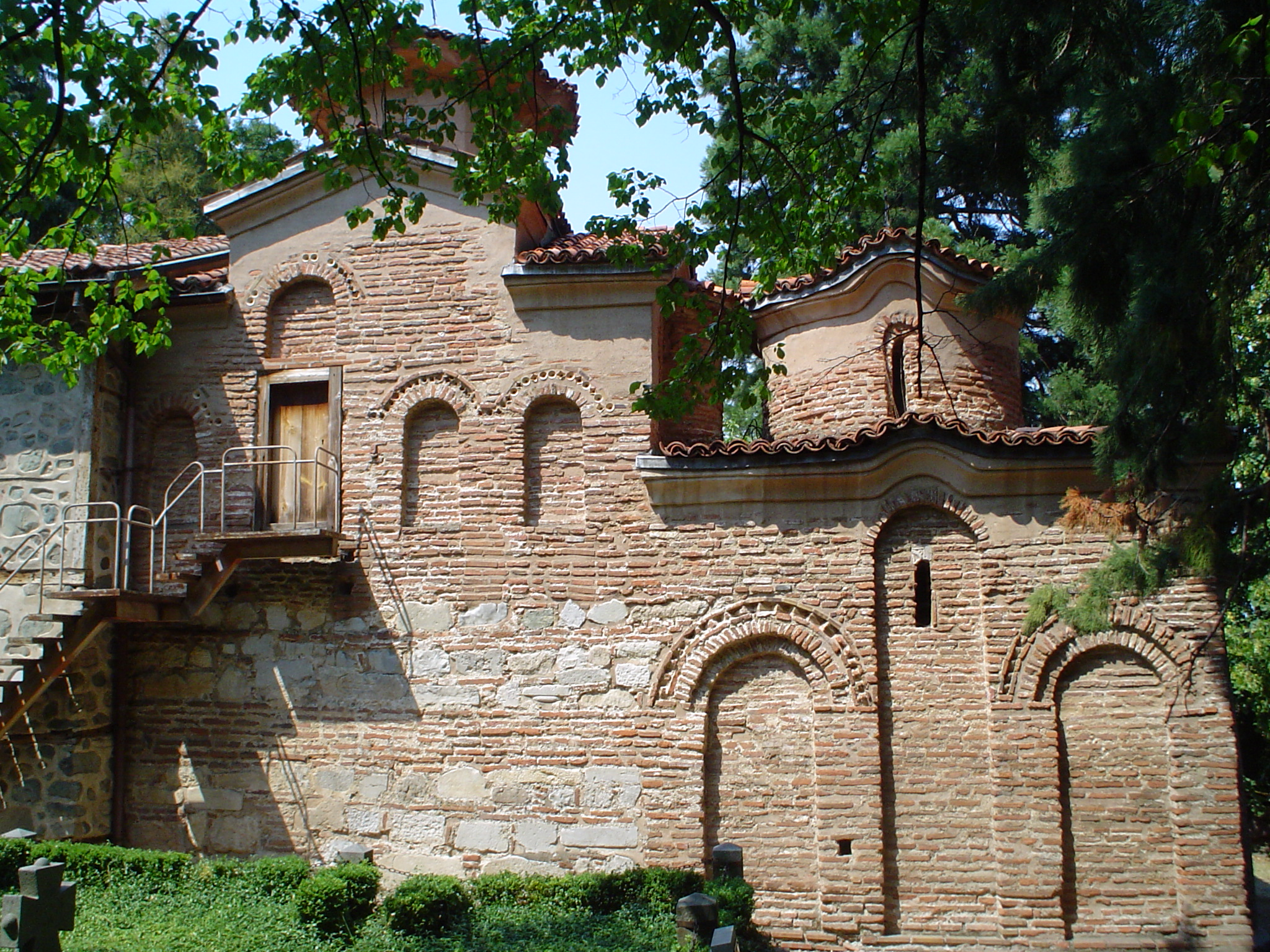
A view of Boyana church

The Boyana church is well known worldwide for the high artistic value of its frescoes dated from 1259. Kaloyan and Desislava are donors to the painters of Tarnovo Artistic School, the creators of these frescoes. The murals form a second layer over the paintings from earlier centuries and are one of the most complete and well-preserved monuments of Bulgarian medieval art.

The Boyana painters went beyond the limitations of the medieval thinking by presenting the man, the saints, the rulers, and the entire world in a more modern light. They created a rich gallery of secular, spiritual, and warrior portraits, where the skillfully depicted psychological characteristics were combined with individual physical beauty. According to many leading experts, the world-famous frescoes in the Boyana Church played an important role in the development of medieval European painting.

== Significance ==
Desislava is one of the most popular medieval Bulgarian women, and she became a muse of many writers, poets, and artists later. Desislava is considered the epitome of Bulgarian women in literature and art, portrayed as a beautiful, free, and independent woman. According to the historian Georgi Konstantinov, she is evidence for the special place of women in the Bulgarian Middle Ages.

== Honours ==
Desislava Cove on Nordenskjöld Coast in Graham Land, Antarctica is named after Desislava.
