= Buxton Brothers Boulevard =

Boulevard in Sofia, Bulgaria

Coordinates: 42°39′55″N 23°16′31″E

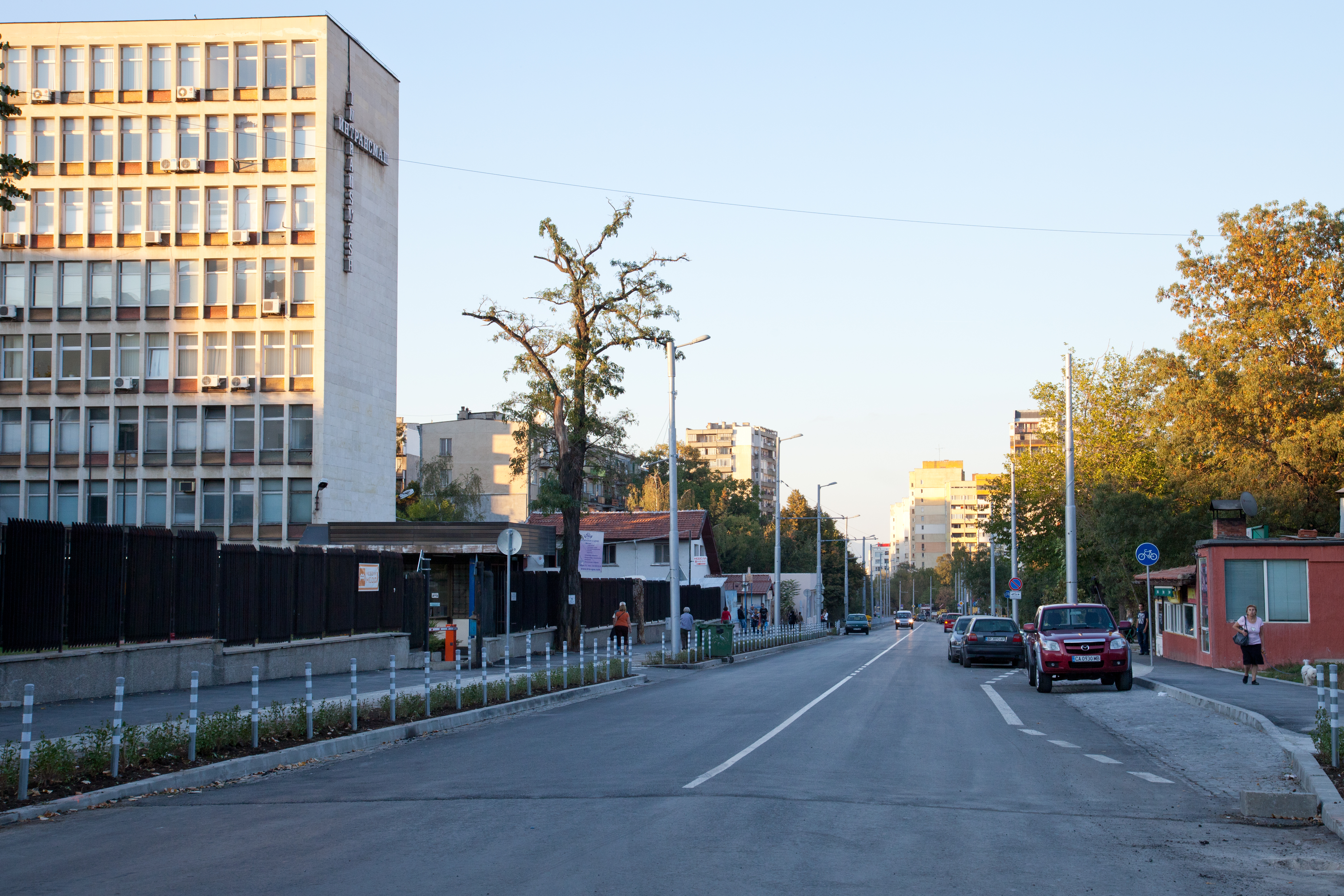

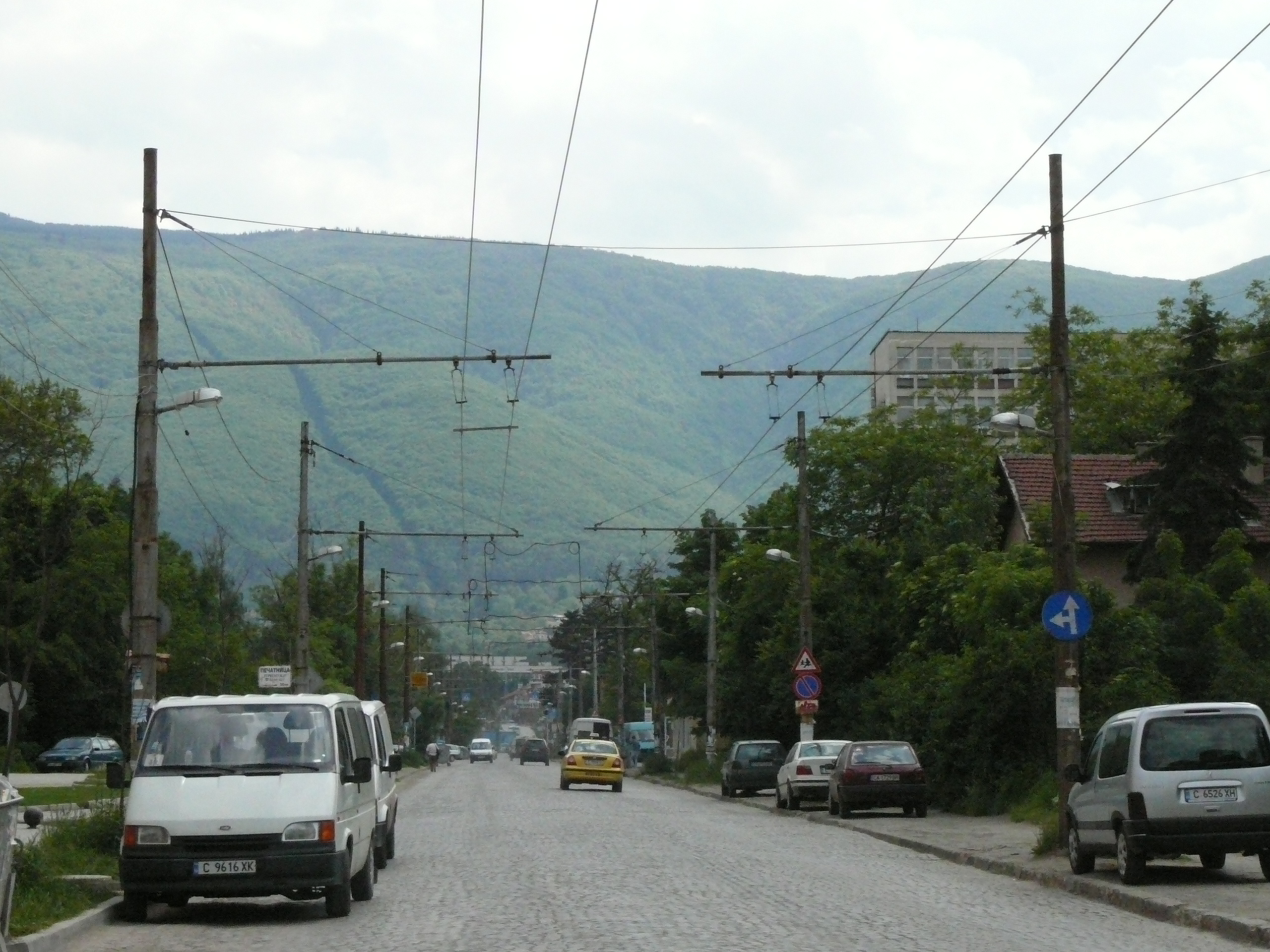

Buxton Brothers Boulevard (Bulgarian: Булевард Братя Бъкстон, Bulevard Bratya Bakston) is a boulevard in south-western Sofia, Bulgaria. It connects Tsar Boris III Boulevard with the ring road. It is still paved with setts.

The neighbourhoods located along Buxton Boulevard, listed in a north to south order, include Buxton, Pavlovo on the western side of the boulevard, and Manastirski Livadi West on the eastern side.

The boulevard is named after Charles and Noel Buxton brothers.
