= Painting of the Tarnovo Artistic School =

13th- to 14th-century Bulgarian painting

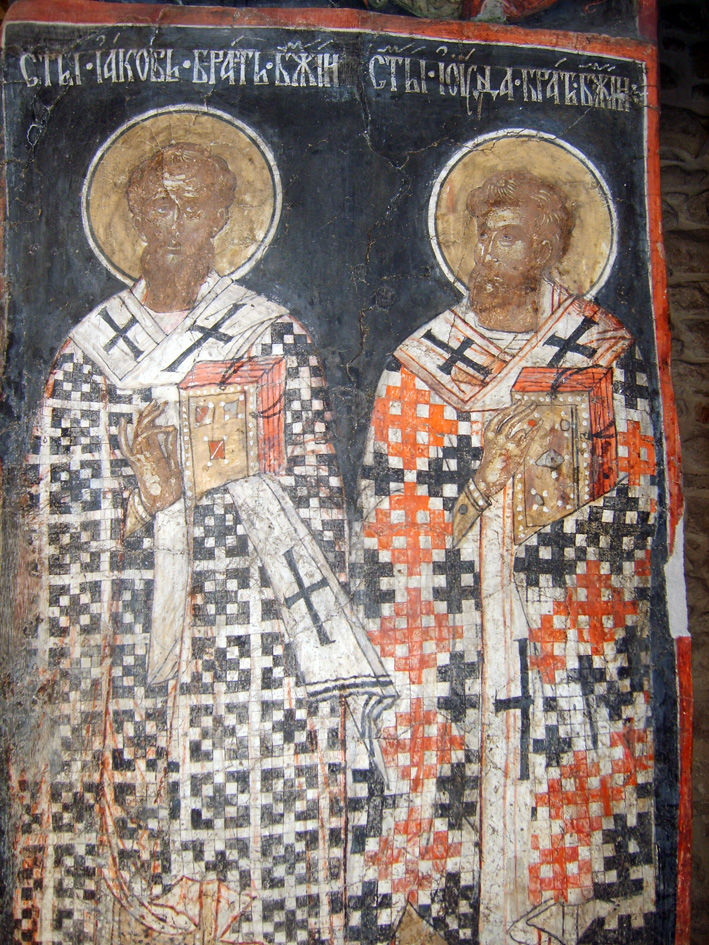
St Jacob /James/ and St Judas from SS Peter and Pavel Church, Tarnovo

The painting of the Tarnovo Artistic School was the mainstream of the Bulgarian fine arts between 13th and 14th centuries named after the capital and the main cultural center of the Second Bulgarian Empire, Tarnovo.

Although it was influenced by some tendencies of the Palaeogan Renaissance in the Byzantine Empire, the Tarnovo painting had its own unique features which makes it a separate artistic school. It includes mural decoration of churches, easel painting icons, and illuminated manuscripts. A few remains of mosaics have been found during archaeological excavation which shows that this technique was only rarely used in the Bulgarian Empire. The works of that school have some degree of realism, individualised portraits and psychological insight.

== Illuminated manuscripts ==
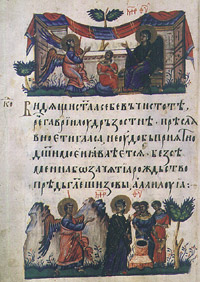
Page from the Tomić Psalter (1360)

The most famous manuscripts are the Sofia Psalter, 1337, Tomić Psalter, c 1360, and the Gospels of Tsar Ivan Alexander, 1355–1356, now in Sofia, Moscow and London respectively. All are heavily illuminated.

== Mural painting ==
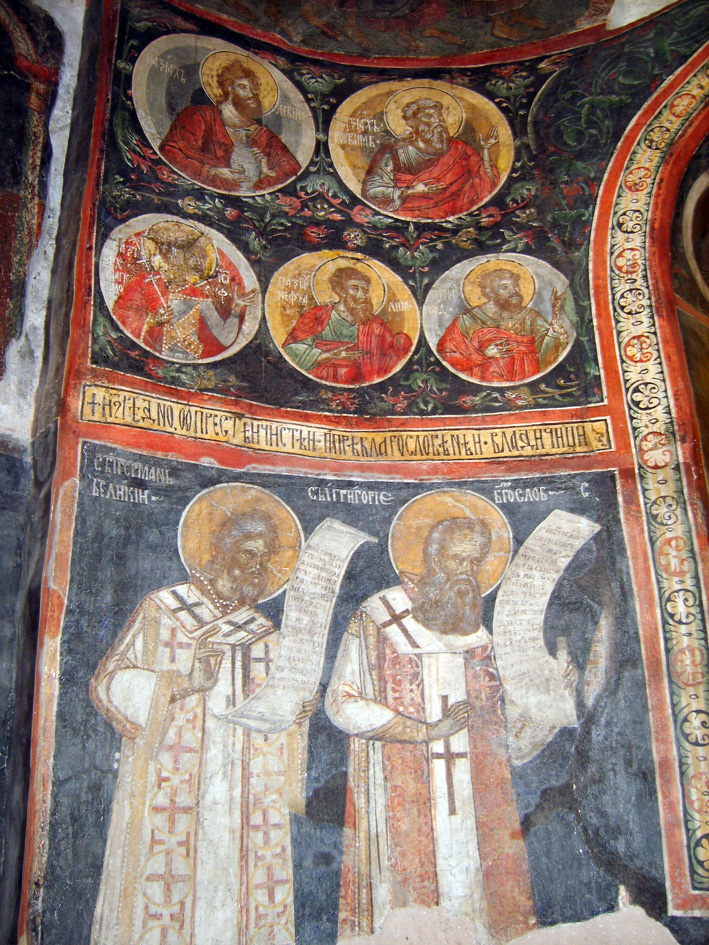
The interior of SS Peter and Pavel

For the first time in Eastern Europe the tempera method became widespread in the murals of the Tarnovo School of Art. That technique allowed the work to proceed slower than the fresco method as well brighter and more saturated colouring and had potential for more additional colours. The fresco technique continued to be used, for instance in the beautiful frescoes of the Rock-hewn Churches of Ivanovo and the chapel of the Hrelyo Tower in the Rila Monastery.

During the Second Empire the murals on the church walls closely encompassed every part of the surface: walls, vaults, columns, wall piers, arches, apses. Their positioning was in horizontal layers according to the church canon.

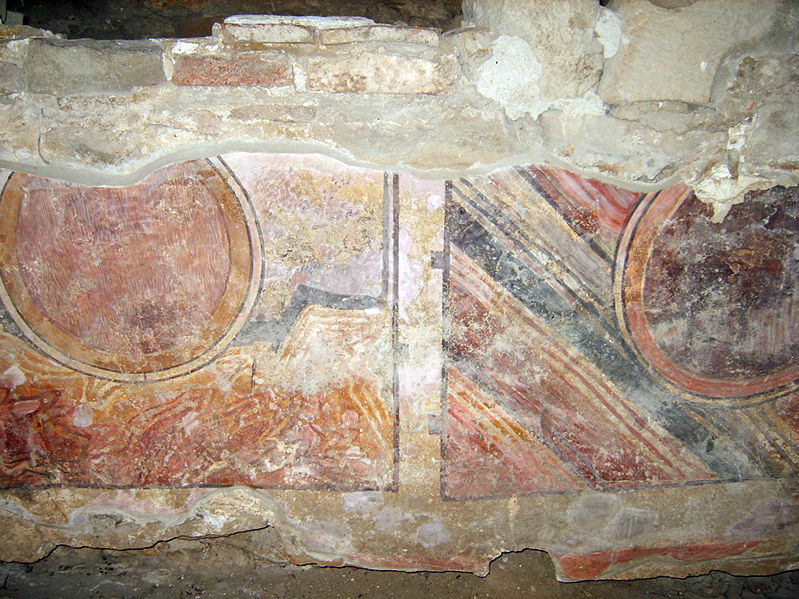
Plinth from SS Forty Martyrs Church in Tarnovo

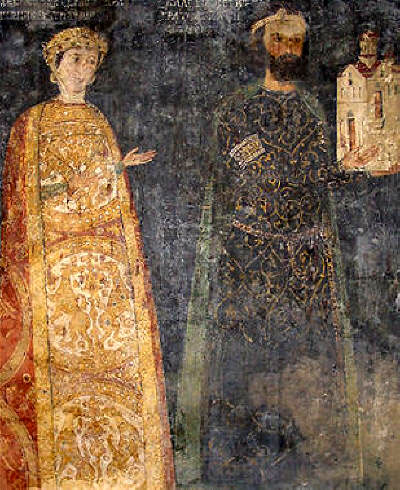
The ktitors of the Boyana Church sevastokrator Kaloyan and his wife Desislava.

On the first layer were depicted saints who were usually stepped on a high painted plinth, which is one of the characteristic features of the School. Its lines imitated the panel plates of coloured marble. The selection of saints depended on the preferences of the ktitors or on the general theme of the frescoes. Typical feature of the Tarnovo Artistic School are the numerous depictions of warrior-saints. For instance, in the Boyana Church there are ten warrior-saints. Widely spread was the image St Demetrius of Salonica, the patron saint of the Asen dynasty, who was particularly popular in Bulgaria in 13th and 14th centuries. The ktitors were depicted in the narthex of the churches. Portraits of many noble Bulgarians from the Middle Ages have survived throughout the centuries due to that practice. In the Boyana Church are preserved the images of Emperor Constantine Tikh Asen, his wife Irina, sebastokrator Kaloyan and his wife Desislava. There is a beautiful fresco of Emperor Ivan Alexander in the ossuary of the Bachkovo Monastery and in the church of Dolna Kamenitsa there are eleven images: despot Michael (son of Michael Shishman) his wife an unknown noble holding a model of the church; his wife and children and two clerics. Images of warrior saints and ktitors were common in the preserved detailed mural paintings on the foundations of the churches in Trapezitsa. These paintings are featured with mild tones and a sense of realism in the rendered portraits and cloths. One of the churches in Trapeztisa was covered with mosaics. The palace church also had some mosaic decoration.

The unique and realistic portraits in the Boyana Church are considered to be forerunners of the Renaissance. The wall piers and the arches were often decorated with medallion-shaped bust images of saints. Magnificent examples of those can be observed in SS Peter and Paul Church in Tarnovo. Along with the traditional scenes such as "Christ's passions" and "Feast cycle" in the second layer; "Christ Pantokrator" in the dome and the Madonna with the infant Christ in the apse, there were also specific images and scenes. In the narthex of the SS. Forty Martyrs Church in Tarnovo there were frescoes of St Anna nursing the infant Mary and St Elisabeth nursing the infant John the Baptist, unfortunately the last one did not survive. The iconographic type Galaktotrophousa was a predecessor of the widely-spread images of Madonna with the infant Christ in Western Europe. Although it was canonical, that scene was rarely used in the Byzantine Iconography. In the 35 calendar scenes from the same church some of the characters were painted with contemporary garments. The large number of images of Jesus Christ in the Boyana Church makes an impression: Pantokrator (All-powerful); Emmanuel (Young man); Evergetes (Blessing); Mandilion; Keramidion and the unique image Christ Ancient of Days in which He is depicted as a white-bearded Old man.

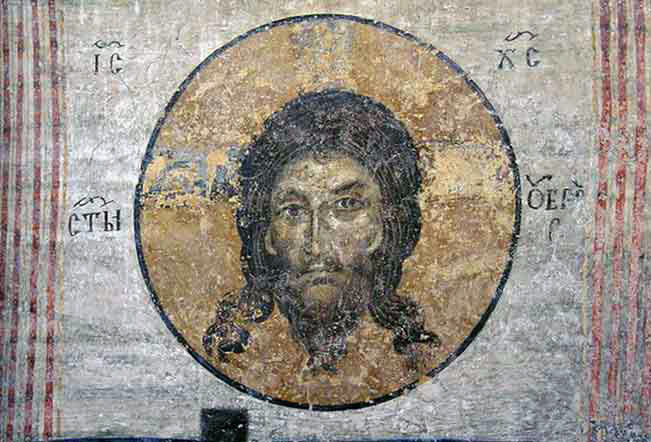
Christ Urbus, Boyana Church near Sofia.

Thеre are original themes in the Transfiguration of God Chapel in the Hrelyo Tower situated in the Rila Monastery. In the dome is depicted the composition Sophia-Great Wisdom of God and in the narthex Psalms of David. The scenes Musicians and Horo are especially interesting because they represent the cloths and the way of living of the Bulgarians during the 14th century. There are scenes of Saint Ivan of Rila life. Although there are relatively few preserved monuments of the Tarnovo School of Painting, they refute the popular opinion that the religious murals are inveterate and that they are inappropriate for artistic imagination.

The archaeological research shows that some public edifices and the palaces were also richly decorated with mural paintings but unfortunately the few remaining fragments are not enough for the themes to be determined. The fragments of richly dressed men were discovered in the throne hall which suggests that probably the hall was decorated with the depictions of the Bulgarian Emperors and Empresses.

== Icons ==
The Tarnovo school continued and enriched the traditions and icon design of the First Bulgarian Empire. Some notable icons include St Eleusa (13th century) from Nessebar which is currently kept in the Alexander Nevski Cathedral in Sofia and St John of Rila (14th century) kept in the Rila Monastery. Like the Boyana Church frescoes in the second one there is realism and non-canonical design. Another feature of the school's iconography were the large icons which were made to fascinate the viewer. An example of such icon is the Poganovo icon in the cathedral of Sofia depicting St Mary with John the Baptist which was produced in 1395. It is double-sided and with a size of 93x61 cm.

The icons were produced with varied material. The famous ceramics icon from the Preslav School during the First Empire remained relatively popular during 13th century. Icons for domestic use were usually 30x35 cm while those in the church altar could reach very large sizes. Bulgarian icon painting declined after the Ottoman conquest of the country but those traditions were continued during the Bulgarian National Revival.

== See also ==
- Architecture of the Tarnovo Artistic School
- Art School of Tarnovo
- Golden Age of medieval Bulgarian culture
- Pliska-Preslav culture
- Tarnovo Literary School
