= Lycée Français Victor Hugo (Bulgaria) =

French international school in Sofia, Bulgaria

Lycée Français de Sofia Victor Hugo (LVH; "The French High School Victor Hugo", Bulgarian: Френско Училище "Виктор Юго") is a French international school in the Maxi Complex (Комплекс Макси) in Vitosha, Sofia, Bulgaria.

LVH is the largest foreign school in Bulgaria, hosting over 800 students from many nationalities. It follows the French National Curriculum of study and has students from nursery school (maternelle) up to twelfth grade (terminale). The student to teacher ratio is approximately 7:1.

LVH was established in 1966. The Embassy of France in Sofia supervises the school.

== The School ==
LVH was created in 1966 and was called "petite école" because it initially welcomed only children in primary school. In 2009, it moved from Lozenetz to its current location in Maxi Complex on Simeonovsko Shossee.

LVH is contracted (conventionné) by the AEFE. The school is run by an association of parents (APE) who gives power to board members (Conseil d’administration).

== French national curriculum ==
From the age of 3, French-speaking and non French-speaking students follow the curriculum as defined by the French national education system and are taught by teachers from France.

The teachers are trained in France, and most of them are natives. Lifelong learning is provided to the pedagogic and administrative teams.

The Primary School (école primaire) from pre school through 5th grade is divided into cycles: cycle 1 (petite section, moyenne section and grande section), cycle 2 (CP, CE1) and cycle 3 (CE2, CM1, CM2).

The Middle School (collège) lasts four years (from sixième to troisième). Instruction is structured according to subjects: French, English, mathematics, history, geography, civics, biology, chemistry, physics, technology, art, music, and physical education.

The High School (lycée) is composed of three years. During the lycée years, students choose a track with emphasis on different courses: track L (literature), ES (economics and social sciences), or S (sciences). Those three years also prepare the students for the French general Baccalaureate examination, the main diploma required to pursue studies in higher education.

For several years now, a 100% of the students have successfully passed the baccalaureate and have been accepted not only in the French higher education institutions (via the Admission Post Bac system) but also in European and Anglo-Saxon universities. LVH offers information and events to help the students choose the studies they will do. A PRIO (Personne Ressource en Information et Orientation) or guidance counsellor is also in charge of helping them.

== Pedagogy and values ==
The CDI (Centre de Documentation et d'Information) is the school library, which has more than 10000 documents.

Yearly projects are also part of the education, mainly in the fields of languages (e.g. literary rally), cinema and audiovisual media (e.g. Cinesofia Festival), mathematics, sciences, etc. Civic and prevention projects are also implemented by the School administration office.

LVH also offers educational projects, green schools, trips and field trips, shows .

== Extra curriculum activities ==
Languages certifications are offered to the students in five languages: French, English, German, Spanish and Bulgarian. The level of the diplomas corresponds to the Common European Framework of Reference for Languages. These examinations are made possible through partnerships with language institutes. LVH is an official exam centre for the DELF certifications.

More than 50 activities via clubs are offered to the students every year. Extracurricular activities include sports (tennis, swimming, ice skating, aikido, etc.), pottery, French language games, Bulgarian classes, science, arts etc. for Primary School students. Every day after class, the students who need to can also join the "aide aux devoirs" where teachers help them with their homework.

LVH has also a full-time nurse, a school restaurant and a child-care centre opened before and after school hours. A bus company ensures the bussing. Wardens on the school premises and at the school's front door provide security.

== Student body ==
As of 2019 the school has 801 students from over 25 countries, making it the largest international school in Bulgaria.
