= Buxton, Sofia =

Coordinates: 42°39′54″N 23°16′31″E

Buxton (Bulgarian: Бъкстон, romanized: Bakston, pronounced [ˈbɤkstɔn]) is a south-western neighbourhood of Sofia, the capital of Bulgaria. Part of Vitosha municipality, it lies between the Buxton Brothers (Bratya Buxton) Boulevard, the Tsar Boris III Boulevard, and the Sofia ringroad adjacent to Boyana.

The neighbourhood was named after the brothers Charles and Noel Buxton, British public figures and prominent advocates of the Bulgarian position on the Macedonian Question in the Balkan Wars and World War I. The central boulevard of the neighbourhood is also named after the brothers.

Buxton features mostly single-family houses and mid- to high-rise residential architecture from the 60s–80s. It is serviced by Secondary School #2 Academician Emiliyan Stanev, Primary School #5 Ivan Vazov and Secondary Specialized School and Kindergarten for Hearing-impaired Children #2. The Vitosha municipality building is also located in the neighbourhood, and there is a Fantastico supermarket in Buxton.

== Gallery ==
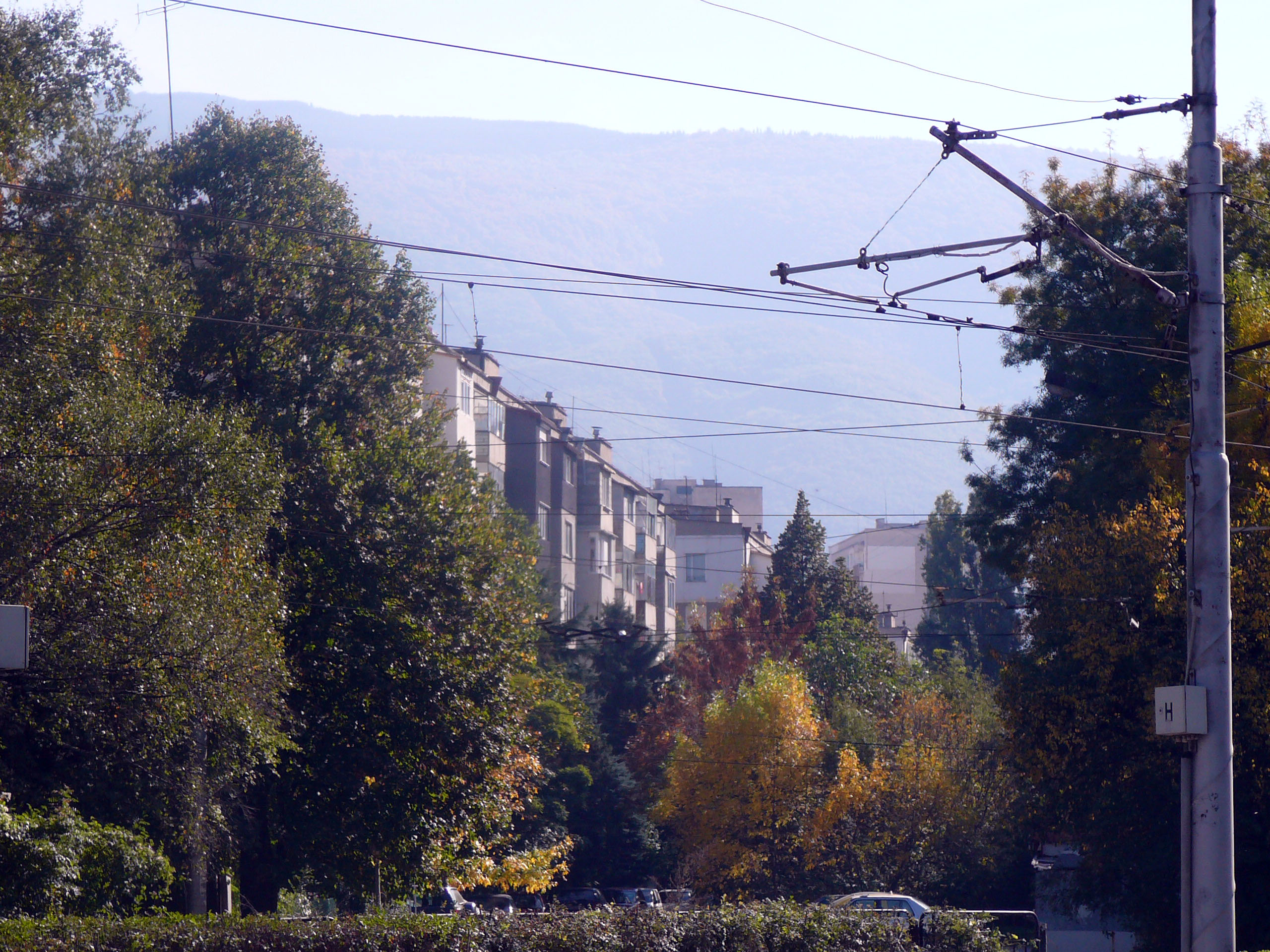
Buxton

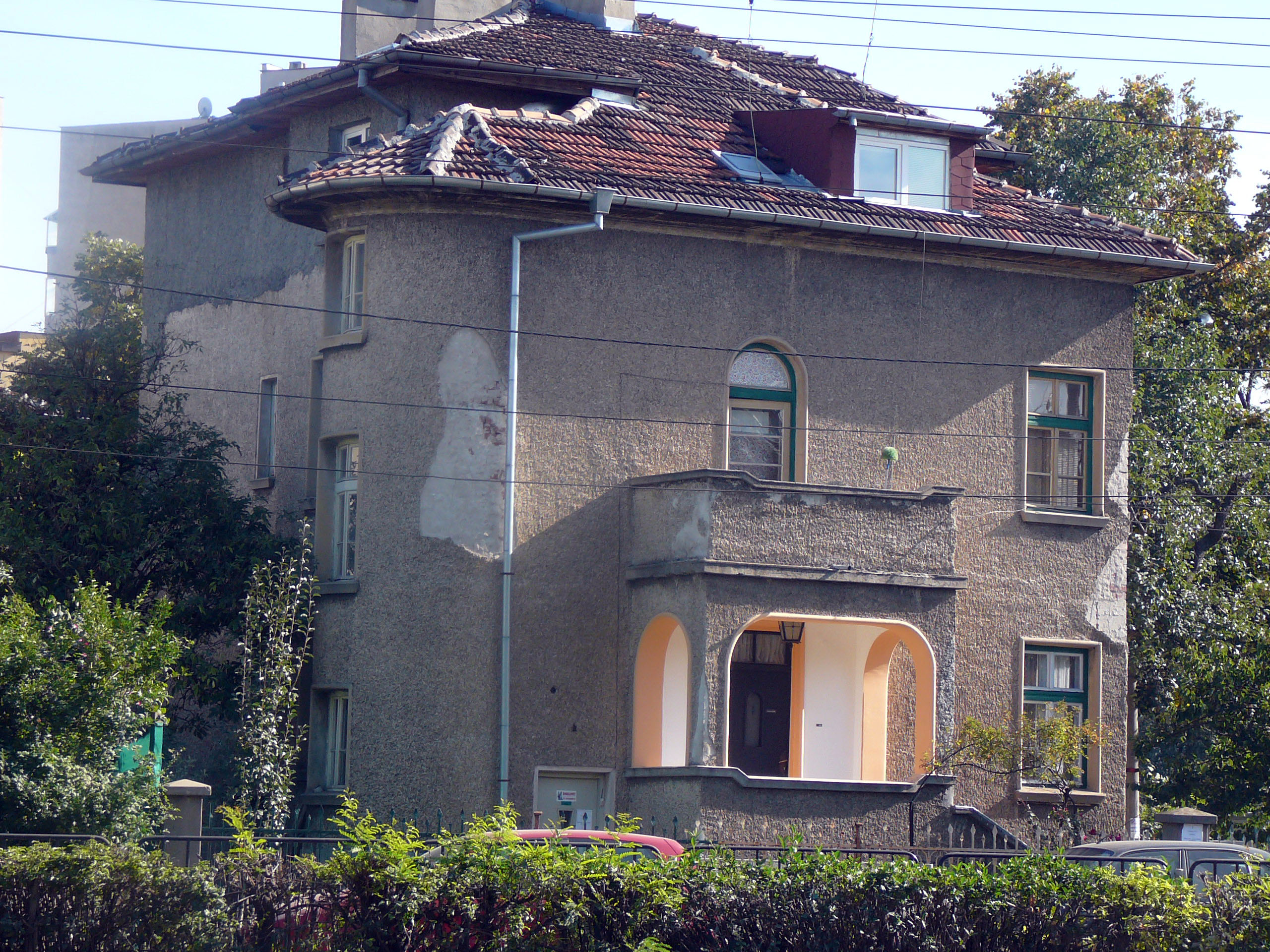
Old house in Buxton
