= Boyana Waterfall =

Waterfall in Bulgaria

Coordinates: 42.629444°N 23.254361°E

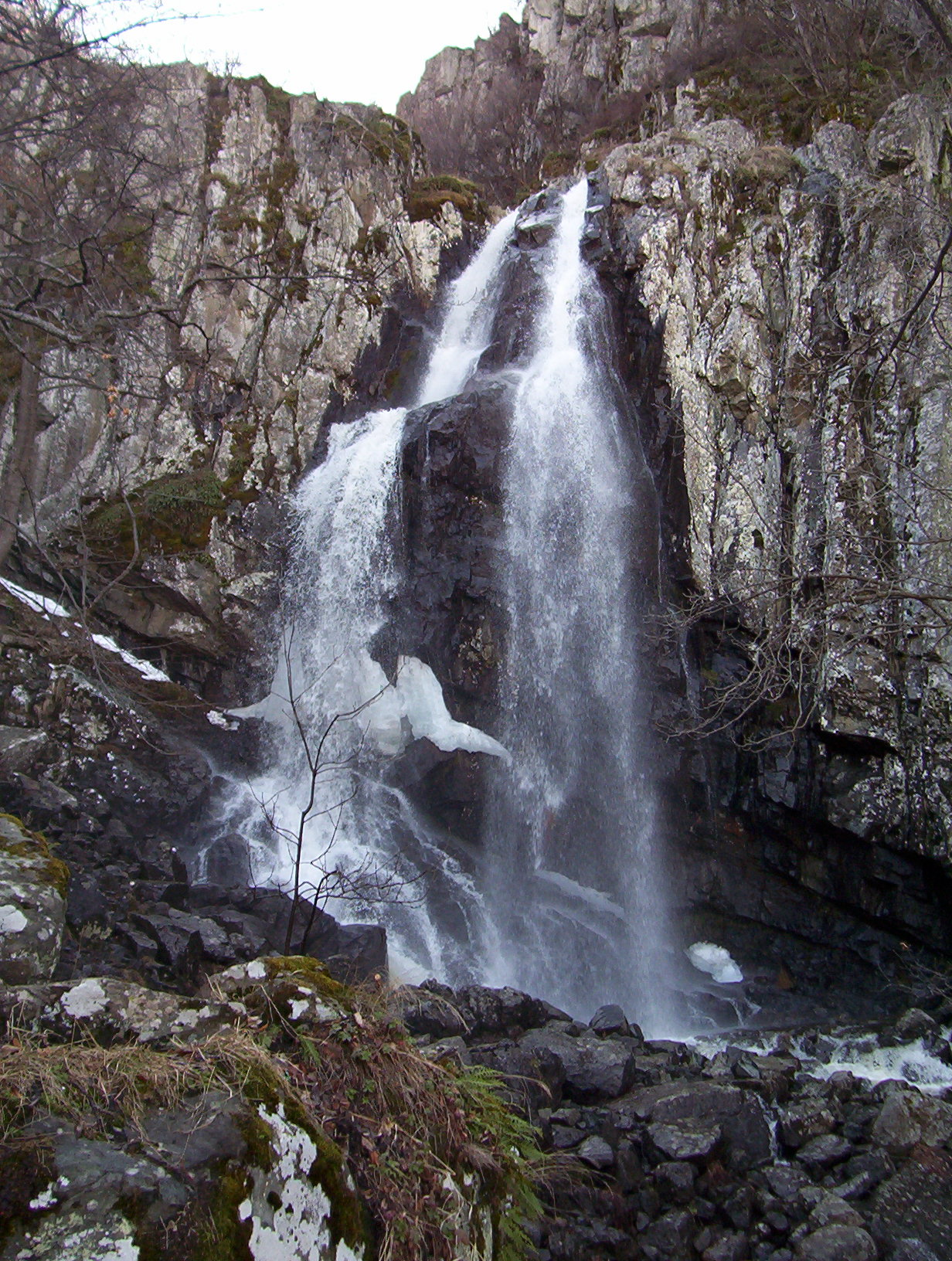
- Boyana Waterfall at spring

- Location within Bulgaria
- Type: Horsetail
- Total height: 25 m (82 ft)

Boyana Waterfall is the largest waterfall in the Vitosha mountain massif in western Bulgaria, with a height of 25 meters.

== Location ==
Boyana Waterfall is formed under the waters of the Boyana River, which streams down the northern hills of Vitosha mountain. The base of the waterfall is located at 1260 meters altitude. The area has a well preserved and uncontaminated nature. In sunny days, the waterfall can sometimes be seen from the capital of Bulgaria, Sofia.

During the cold days of winter, the Boyana Waterfall freezes due to the shadowy valley of its location. The waterfall is easily accessible by foot but not by car. It is one of the important natural landmarks near Sofia. The quickest route to the Boyana waterfall is through the Kopitoto hotel and takes about one hour of walking.

== Hiking routes and tourism ==
There are two hiking routes that you can take from different locations to reach the waterfall. The first one is the Boyana neighborhood in Sofia, which is located in the upper part of the Bulgarian capital. The hiking trails start from there upward and left toward the Boyana Lake, and upward right toward the Boyana Waterfall. Taking the route through the lake is longer but less steep. The route situated on the right is shorter but steeper and sometimes gets frozen during winter. The second point you can start a hike from is Kopitoto which is an area situated on 1345 meters altitude in Vitosha mountain, which can be reached by car. Many expeditions toward Cherni Vrah pass through the Boyana Waterfall.

The waterfall is used for alpine climbing during the winter season when it freezes.

== See also ==
- List of waterfalls
