= Boyana =

Neighbourhood in Bulgaria

Coordinates: 42°38′41″N 23°15′58″E

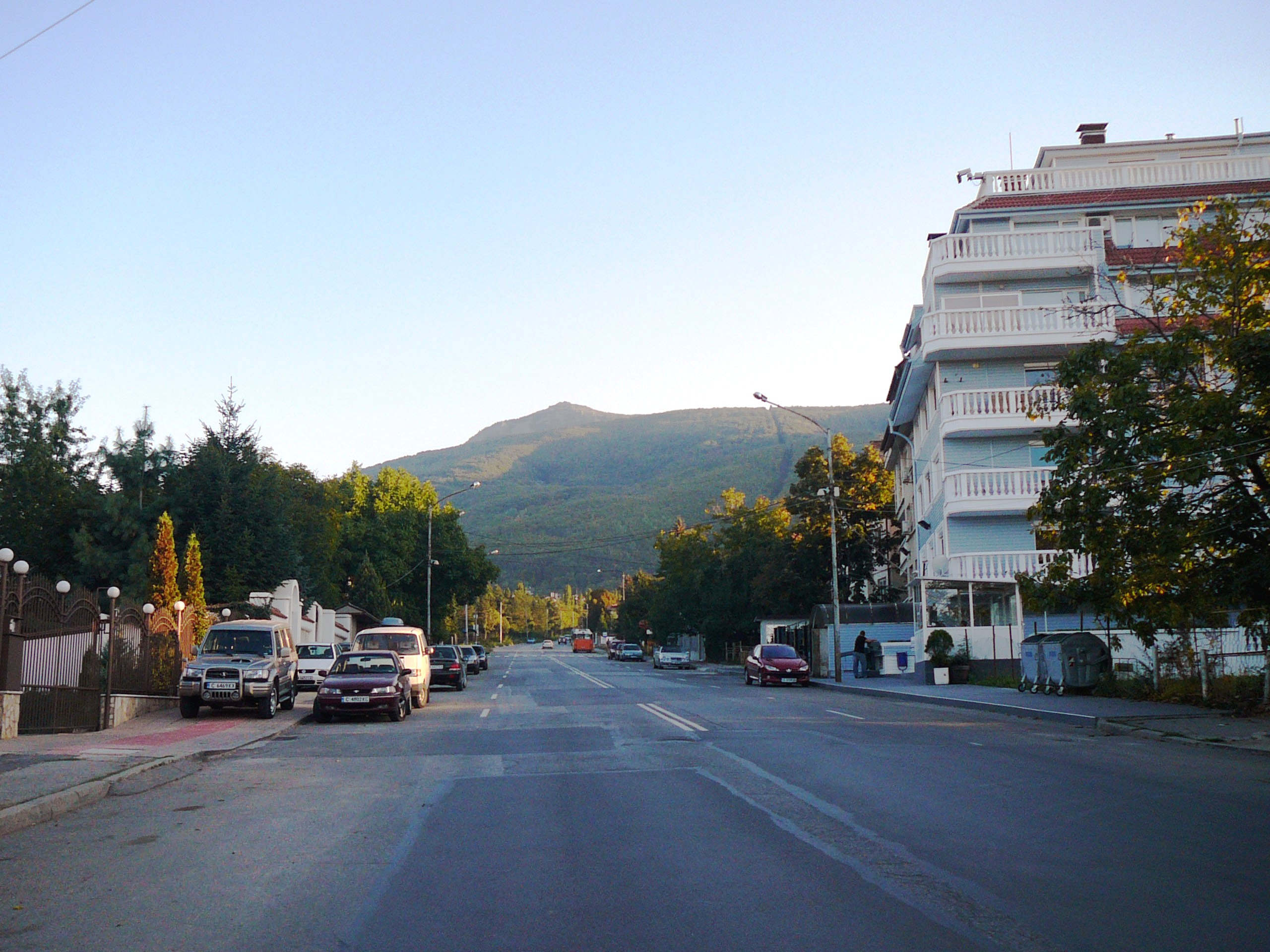
A street in Boyana

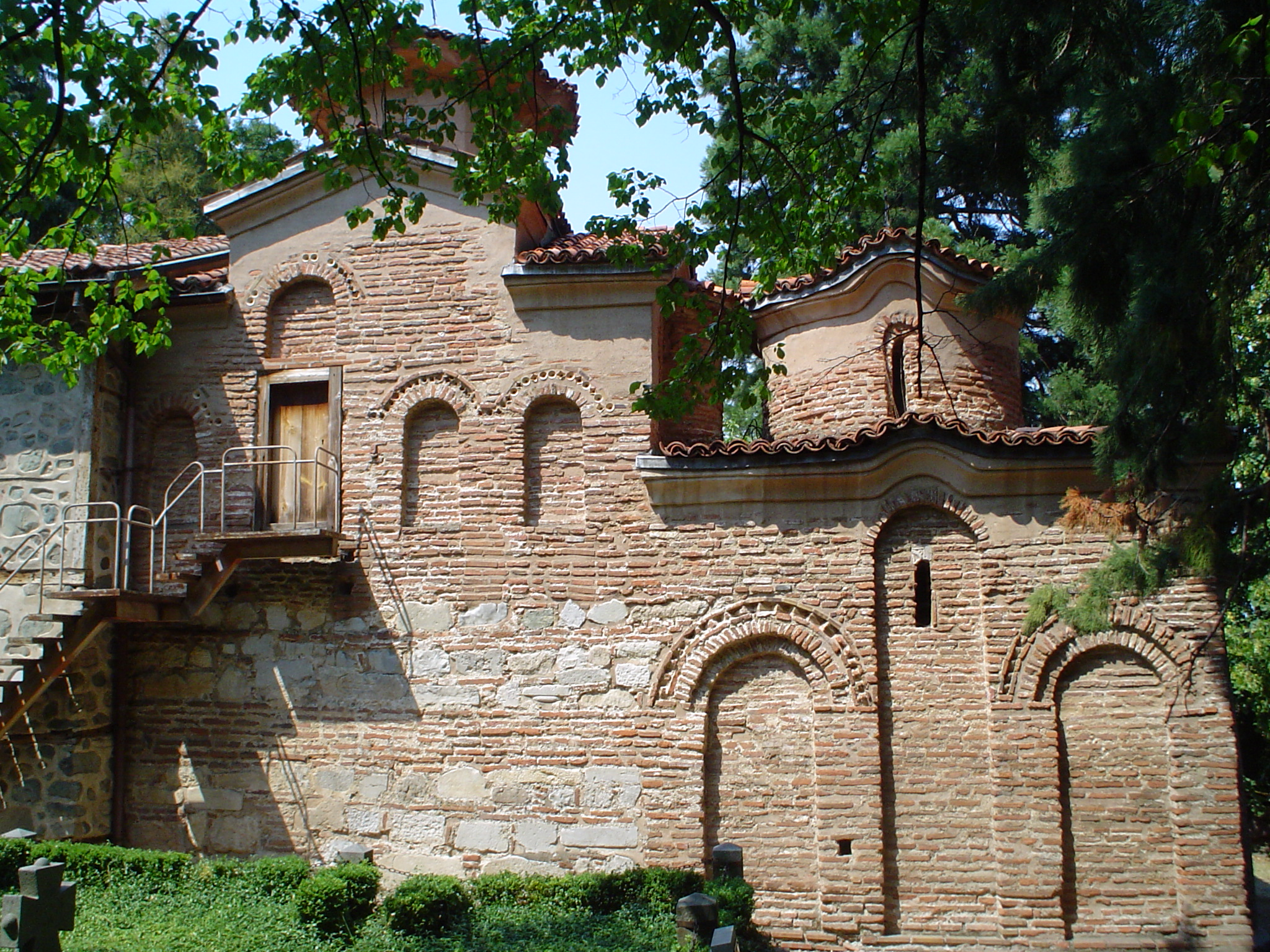
The Boyana Church

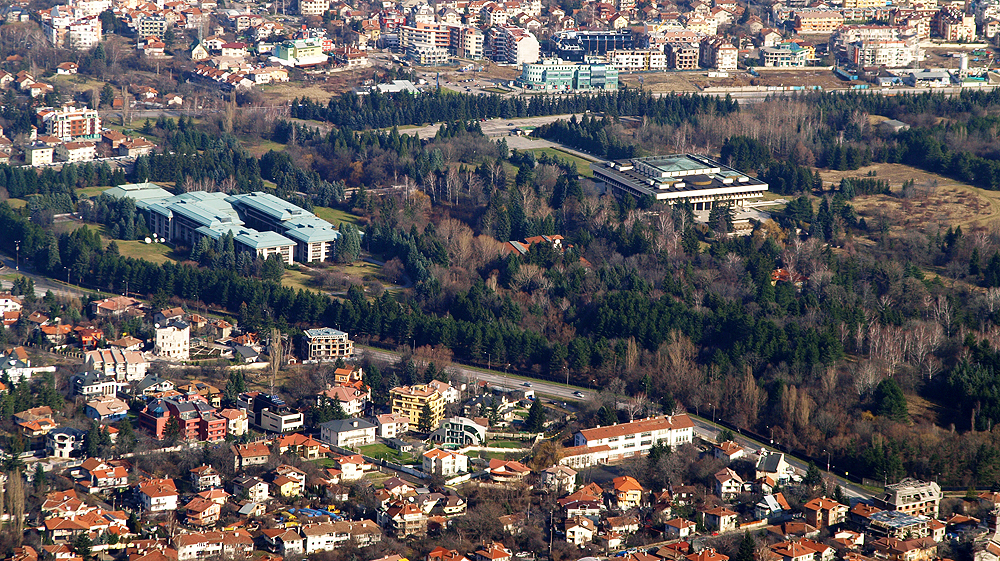
Boyana residence and National Historical Museum (Bulgaria)- view from Vitosha, Kopitoto

Boyana (Bulgarian: Бояна [boˈjanɐ]) is a neighbourhood of the Bulgarian capital of Sofia, part of Vitosha municipality and situated 8 km south of the city centre, in the outskirts of Vitosha. Boyana is one of the most expensive parts of Sofia to live in. The residents are primarily wealthy business people, government officials, and other prominent members of Bulgarian society. Formerly an outlying village, it was incorporated into Sofia in 1961.

== History ==
Boyana's name was first mentioned in the 11th-century Vision of Daniel in the excerpt РЄЧЄТЬ ОУ БОІАНѢ ѠСТАВИТЄ ТОУ ПЛѢНЬ. The name is most likely derived from the personal name Boyan. An alternative suggested etymology from Vulgar Latin or Balkan Latin *boiana ("herdsman's [river]), from Latin boviana ("herdsman's") is considered less likely.

In connection with the 1040 uprising of Peter Delyan and the Pecheneg invasion of 1048, an important stronghold under the name of Boyan (Боян, Βοιάνος) is mentioned in the area, where a garrison led by a voivod called Botko was stationed.

== Architecture ==
The famous Boyana Church, part of the UNESCO World Heritage List, is located in the neighbourhood. Other landmarks include the Boyana Waterfall, the Kopitoto area and the National Historical Museum in the palatial former Boyana Residence, designed by Alexander Georgiev Barov. The Nu Boyana Film studios and the Big Brother Bulgaria house are also located in Boyana.

== See also ==
- Boyana Glacier on Livingston Island in the South Shetland Islands, Antarctica, which is named for Boyana.
- Boyan (given name)
- Boyanska reka
- Boyana Waterfall
- Boyana Lake
