= Byzantine architecture =

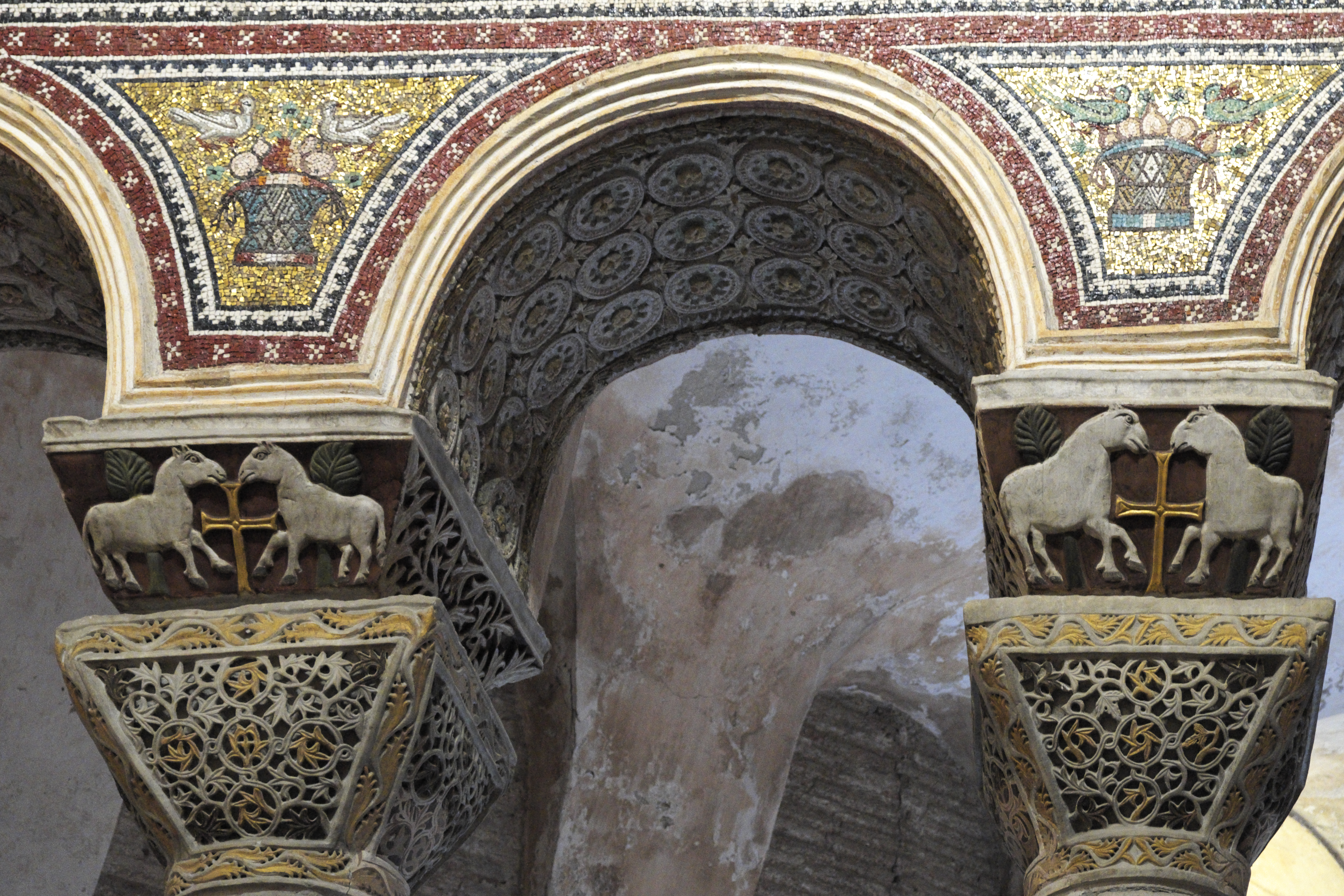
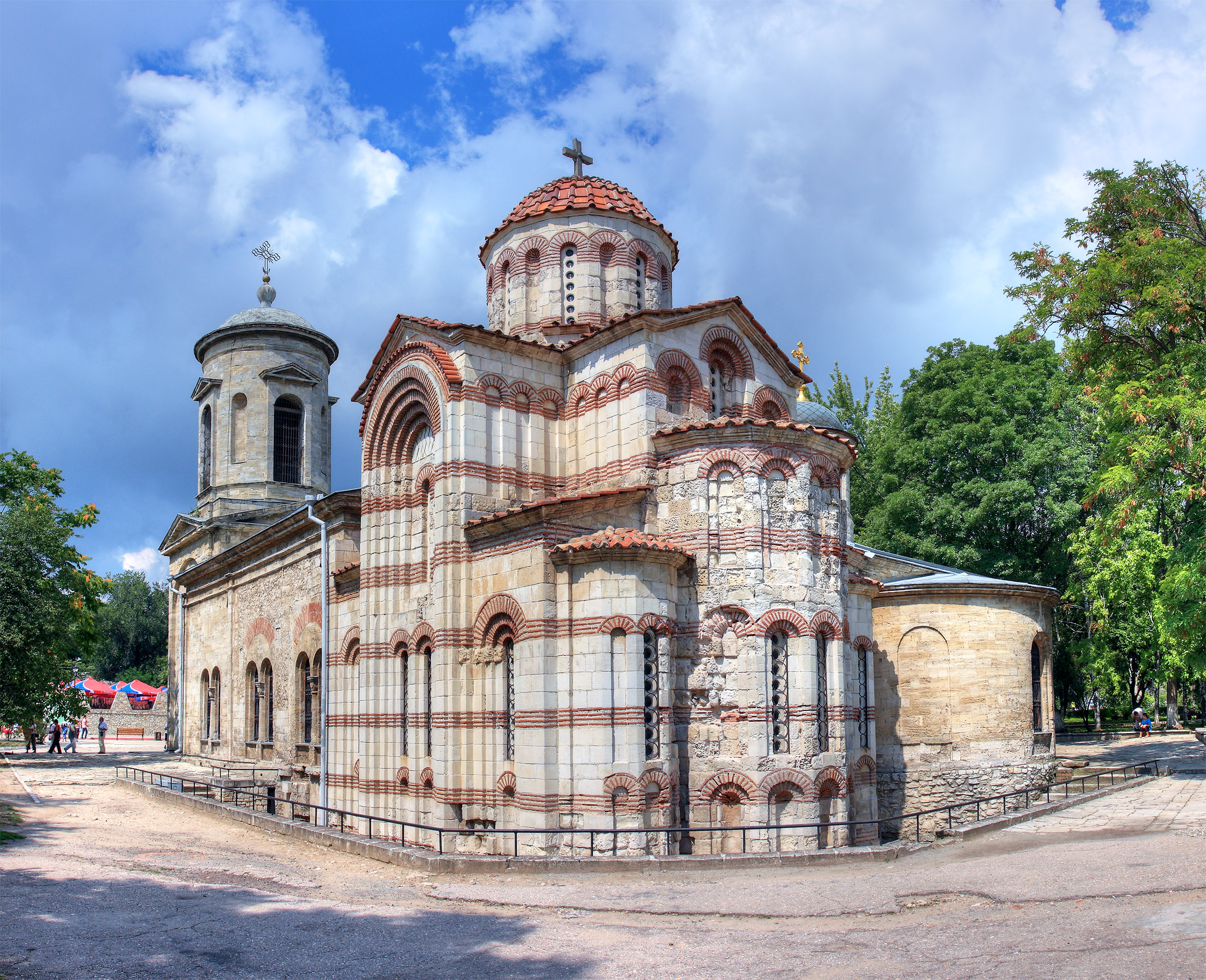
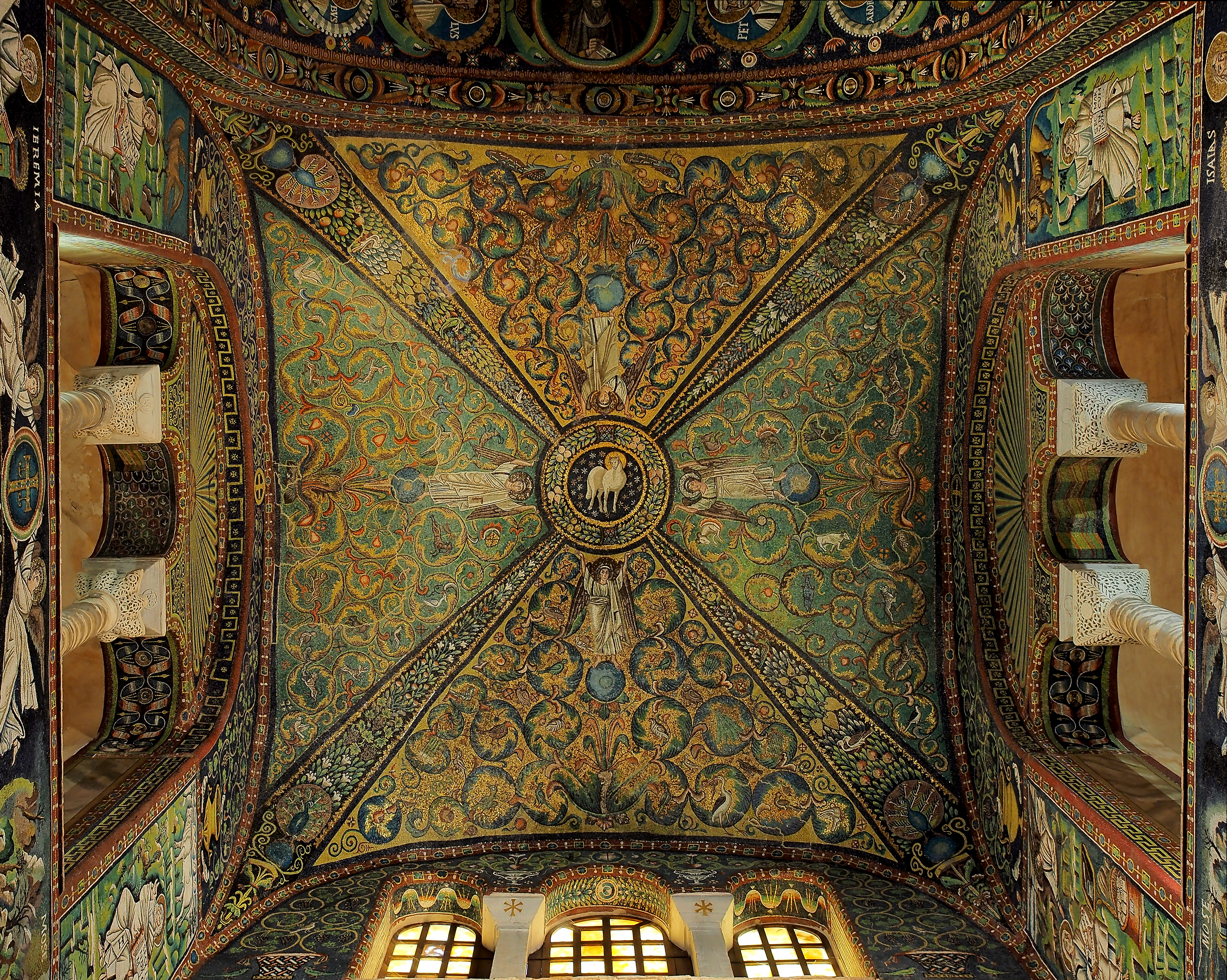
- From left to right: Hagia Sophia in Turkey, Basilica of San Vitale in Italy, Church of St John the Baptist in Crimea, Basilica of San Vitale
- Years active: 4th century – 1453
- Location: Byzantine Empire and Eastern Orthodox countries

The architecture of the Byzantine (Eastern Roman) Empire is usually dated from AD 330, when Constantine the Great established a new Roman capital in Byzantium, which became Constantinople, until the fall of the Byzantine Empire in 1453. There was initially no hard line between the Byzantine and Roman Empires, and early Byzantine architecture is stylistically and structurally indistinguishable from late Roman architecture. The style continued to be based on arches, vaults and domes, often on a large scale. Wall mosaics with gold background became standard for the grandest buildings, with frescos a cheaper alternative.

The richest interiors were finished with thin plates of marble or coloured and patterned stone. Some of the columns were also made of marble. Other widely used materials were bricks and stone. Mosaics made of stone or glass tesserae were also elements of interior architecture. Precious wood furniture, like beds, chairs, stools, tables, bookshelves and silver or golden cups with beautiful reliefs, decorated Byzantine interiors.

Early Byzantine architecture drew upon earlier elements of Roman and Greek architecture. Stylistic drift, technological advancement, and political and territorial changes meant that a distinct style gradually resulted in the Greek cross plan in church architecture. Civil architecture continued Greco-Roman trends; the Byzantines built impressive fortifications and bridges, but generally not aqueducts on the same scale as the Romans.

This terminology was introduced by modern historians to designate the medieval Roman Empire as it evolved as a distinct artistic and cultural entity centered on the new capital of Constantinople (modern-day Istanbul) rather than the city of Rome and its environs. Its architecture dramatically influenced the later medieval architecture throughout Europe and the Near East.

== Characteristics ==
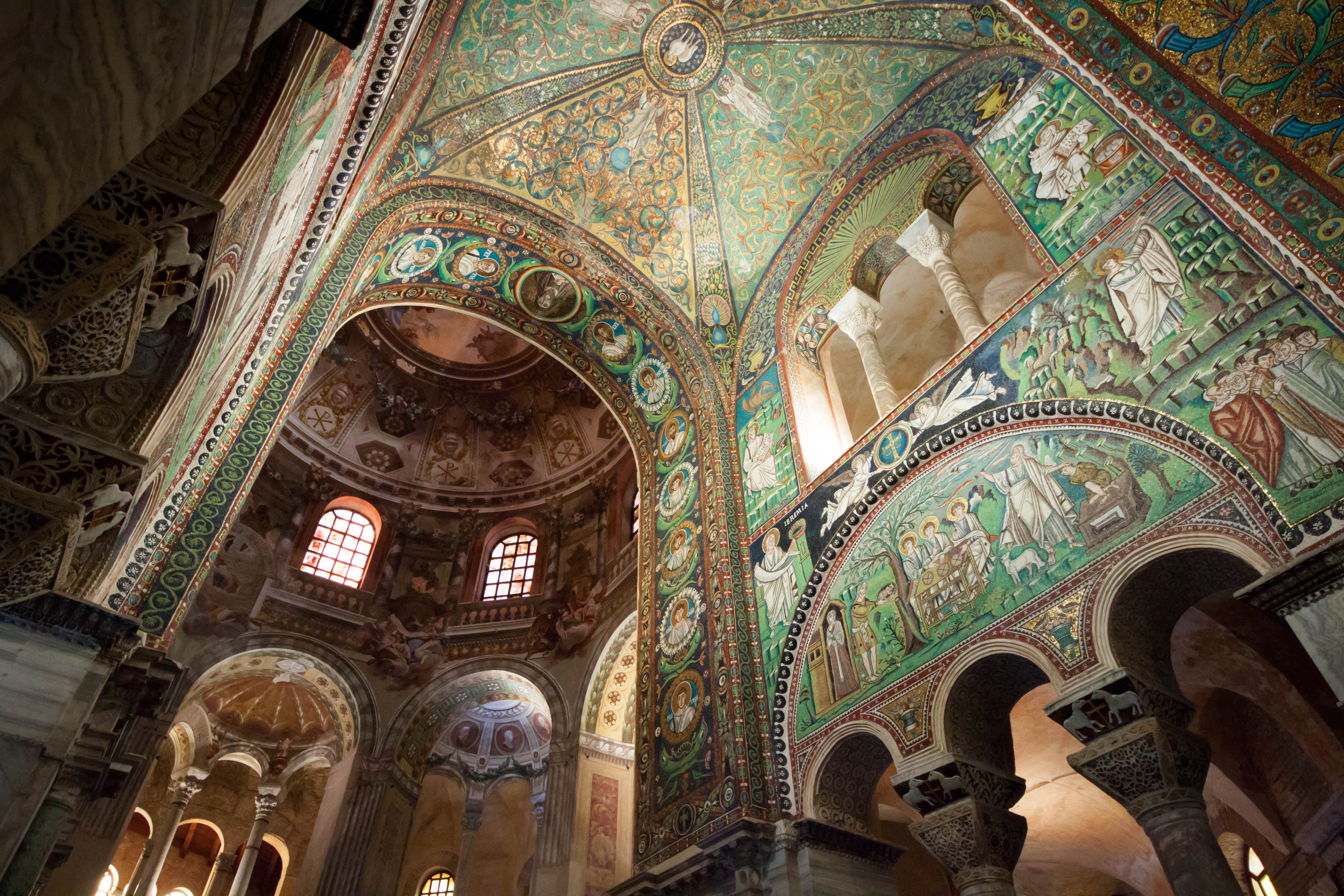
Interior of the Basilica of San Vitale from Ravenna (Italy), decorated with elaborate and glamorous mosaics

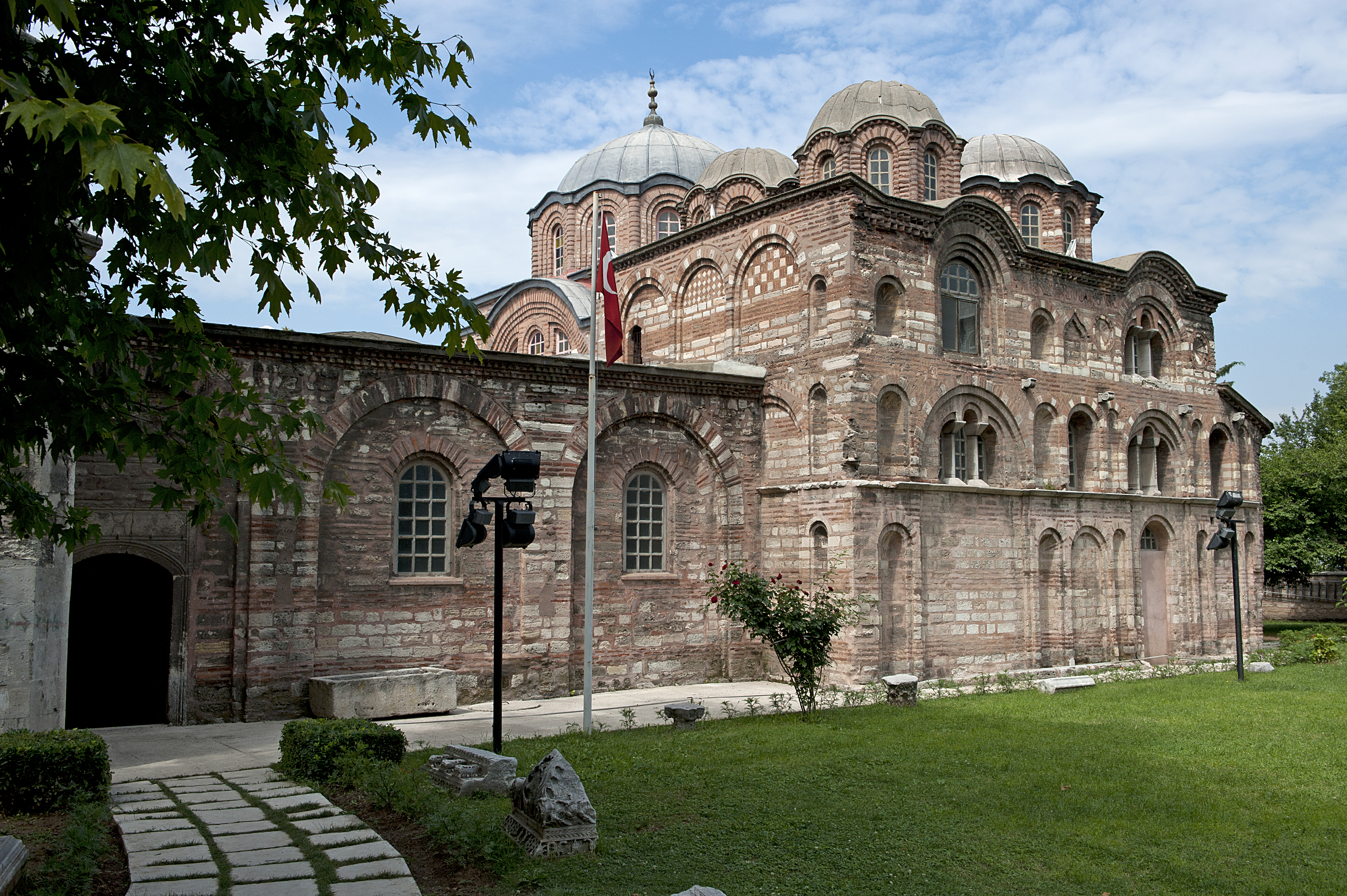
Pammakaristos Church, also known as the Church of Theotokos Pammakaristos (Greek: Θεοτόκος ἡ Παμμακάριστος, "All-Blessed Mother of God"), is a Greek Orthodox Byzantine church in Istanbul

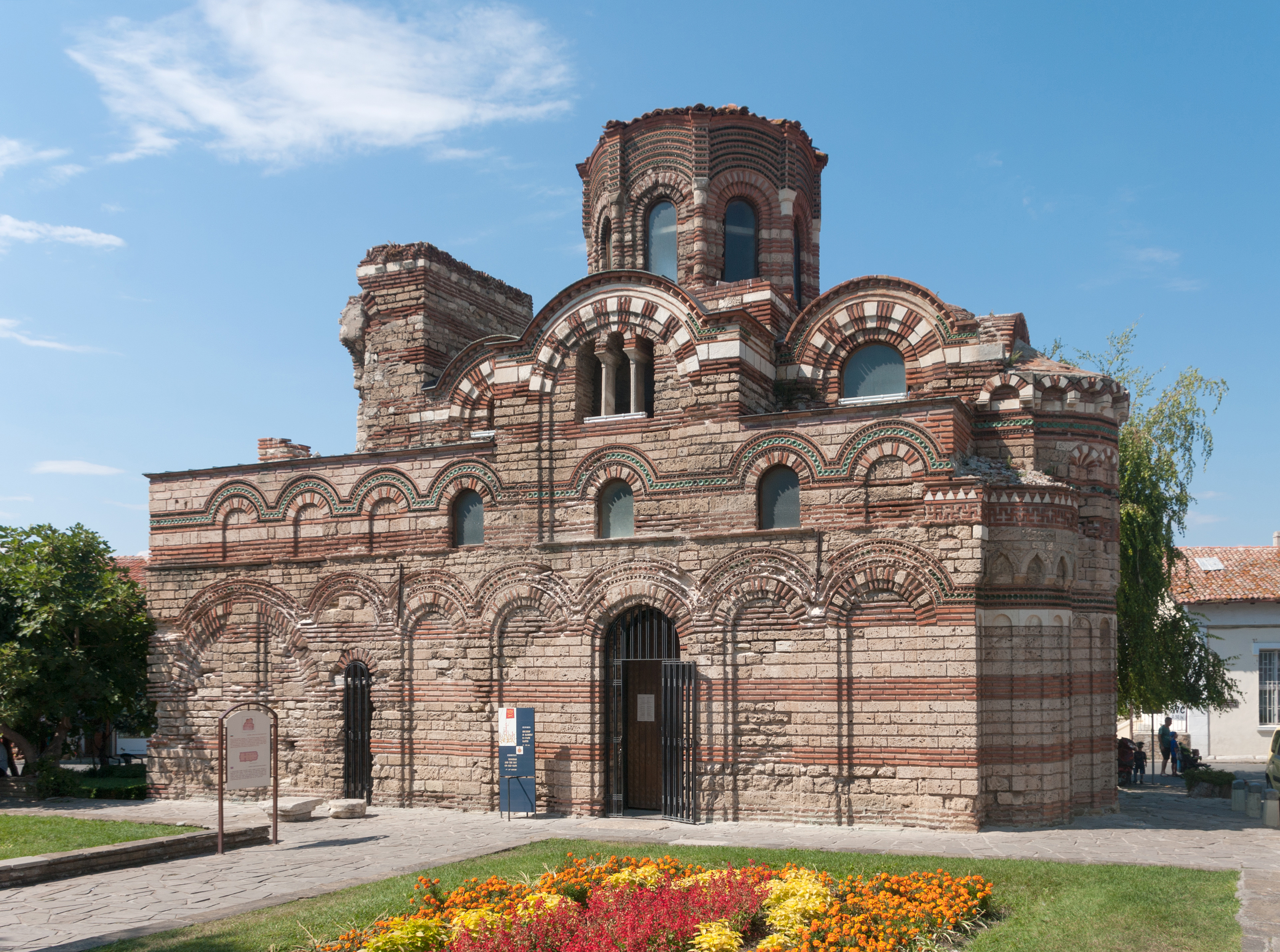
Church of Christ Pantocrator (13th-14th century), Nesebar, Bulgaria, late Byzantine cross-in-square style, UNESCO World Heritage Site

When the Roman Empire became Christian (after having extended eastwards) with its new capital at Constantinople, its architecture became more sensuous and ambitious. This new style with exotic domes and richer mosaics would come to be known as "Byzantine" before it traveled west to Ravenna and Venice and as far north as Moscow. Most of the churches and basilicas have high-riding domes, which created vast open spaces at the centers of churches, thereby heightening the light. The round arch is a fundamental of Byzantine style. Magnificent golden mosaics with their graphic simplicity brought light and warmth into the heart of churches. Byzantine capitals break away from the Classical conventions of ancient Greece and Rome with sinuous lines and naturalistic forms, which are precursors to the Gothic style.

In the same way the Parthenon is the most impressive monument for Classical religion, Hagia Sophia remained the iconic church for Christianity. The temples of these two religions differ substantially from the point of view of their interiors and exteriors. For Classical temples, only the exterior was important, because only the priests entered the interior, where the statue of the deity to whom the temple was dedicated was kept. The ceremonies were held outside, in front of the temple. Instead, Christian liturgies were held inside the churches.

Broadly speaking, according to Patricios, sacred Byzantine architecture falls into one of seven types:

1. basilican – dominant from the fourth to the seventh centuries;
2. domed basilica – where all parts of the church were covered by masonry vaults and the dome was placed at the centre point of the length of the church;
3. cruciform – typically tripartite—the Bema or sanctuary faces east, the naos or nave space in the middle, and the narthex or entrance vestibule to the west;
4. centralized – designed initially as martyria (tomb-shrines of martyrs) and baptisteries, often where the longitudinal axis of the basilica was replaced by a vertical axis, that served as the focal point;
5. converted temple – taking various forms based on the conversion of ancient Egyptian temples;
6. cross-in-square – prominent during the ninth century, and then took over as the dominant form, with a square central mass and four arms of equal length, typically, with a distinctive domed-roof; and
7. Athonite – created in the tenth century, based on the cross-in-square form with two major modifications: two side apses and two narthexes

== Columns ==
Byzantine columns are quite varied, mostly developing from the classical Corinthian, with the ornamentation undercut with drills, and fluted shafts almost entirely abandoned. The block of stone was left rough as it came from the quarry, and the sculptor evolved new designs to his own fancy, so that one rarely meets with many repetitions of the same design. One of the most remarkable designs features leaves carved as if blown by the wind; the finest example being at the 7th-century Hagia Sophia (Thessaloniki). Those in the Cathedral of Saint Mark, Venice (1071) specially attracted John Ruskin's fancy. Others appear in Sant'Apollinare in Classe, Ravenna (549).

The column in San Vitale, Ravenna (547) shows above it the dosseret required to carry the arch, the springing of which was much wider than the abacus of the column. On eastern columns the eagle, the lion and the lamb are occasionally carved, but treated conventionally.

There are two types of columns used at Hagia Sophia: Composite and Ionic. The Composite column that emerged during the Late Byzantine Empire, mainly in Rome, combines the Corinthian with the Ionic. Composite columns line the principal space of the nave. Ionic columns are used behind them in the side spaces, in a mirror position relative to the Corinthian or Composite orders (as was their fate well into the 19th century, when buildings were designed for the first time with a monumental Ionic order). At Hagia Sophia, though, these are not the standard imperial statements. The columns are filled with foliage in all sorts of variations. In some, the small, lush leaves appear to be caught up in the spinning of the scrolls – clearly, a different, nonclassical sensibility has taken over the design.

The columns at Basilica of San Vitale show wavy and delicate floral patterns similar to decorations found on belt buckles and dagger blades. Their inverted pyramidal form has the look of a basket.

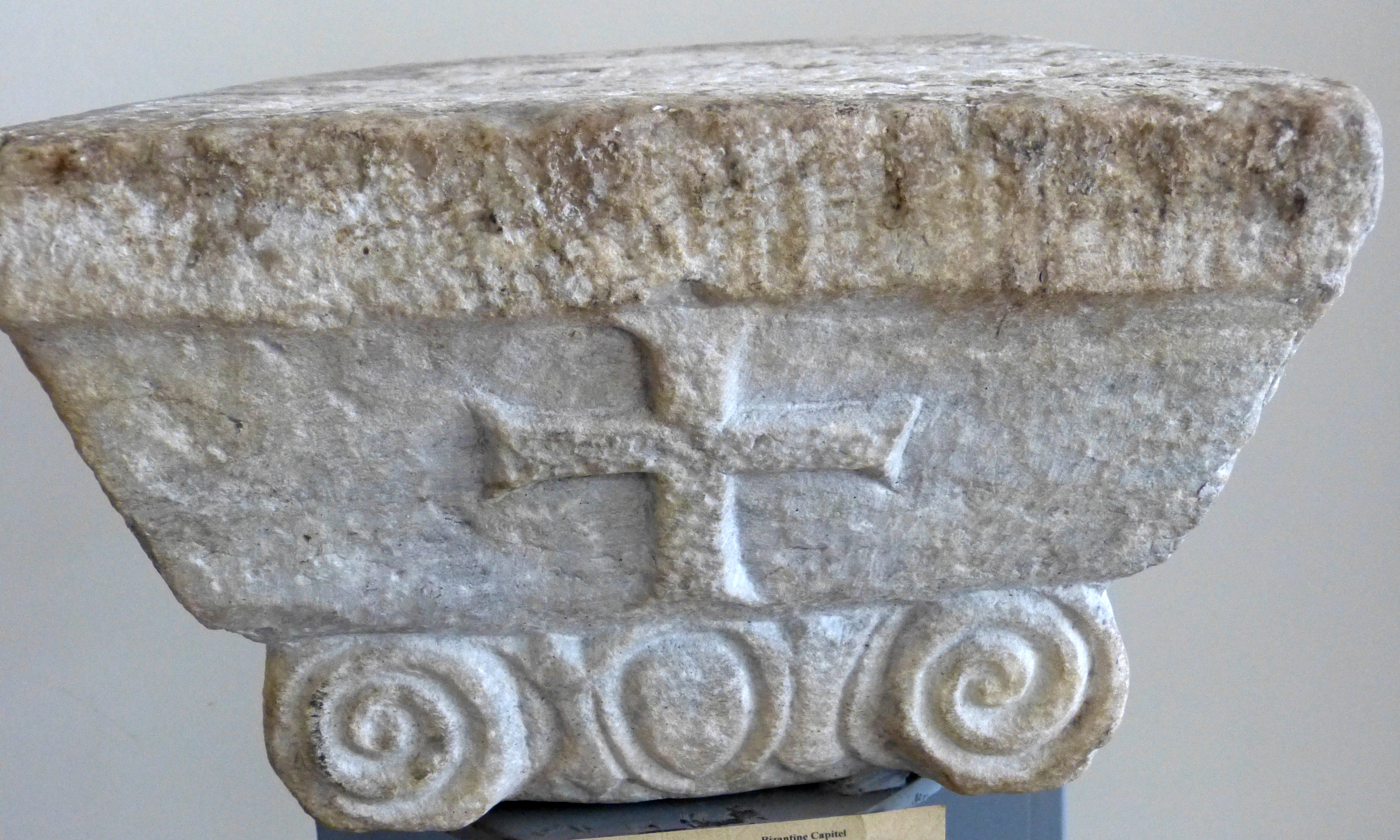
Byzantine Ionic column from National Museum of Medieval Art (Korçë, Albania)

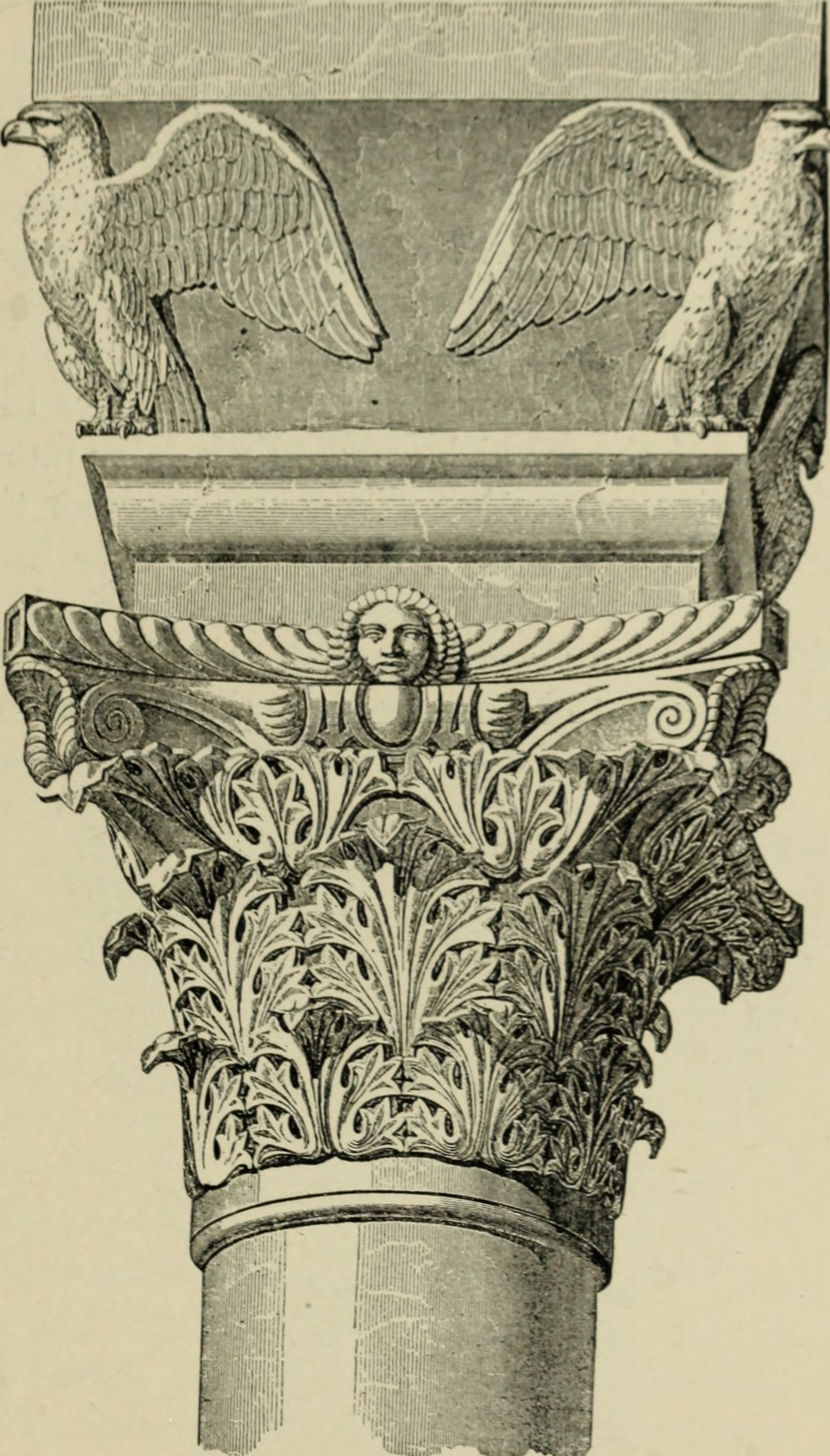
Illustration of a Byzantine Corinthian column

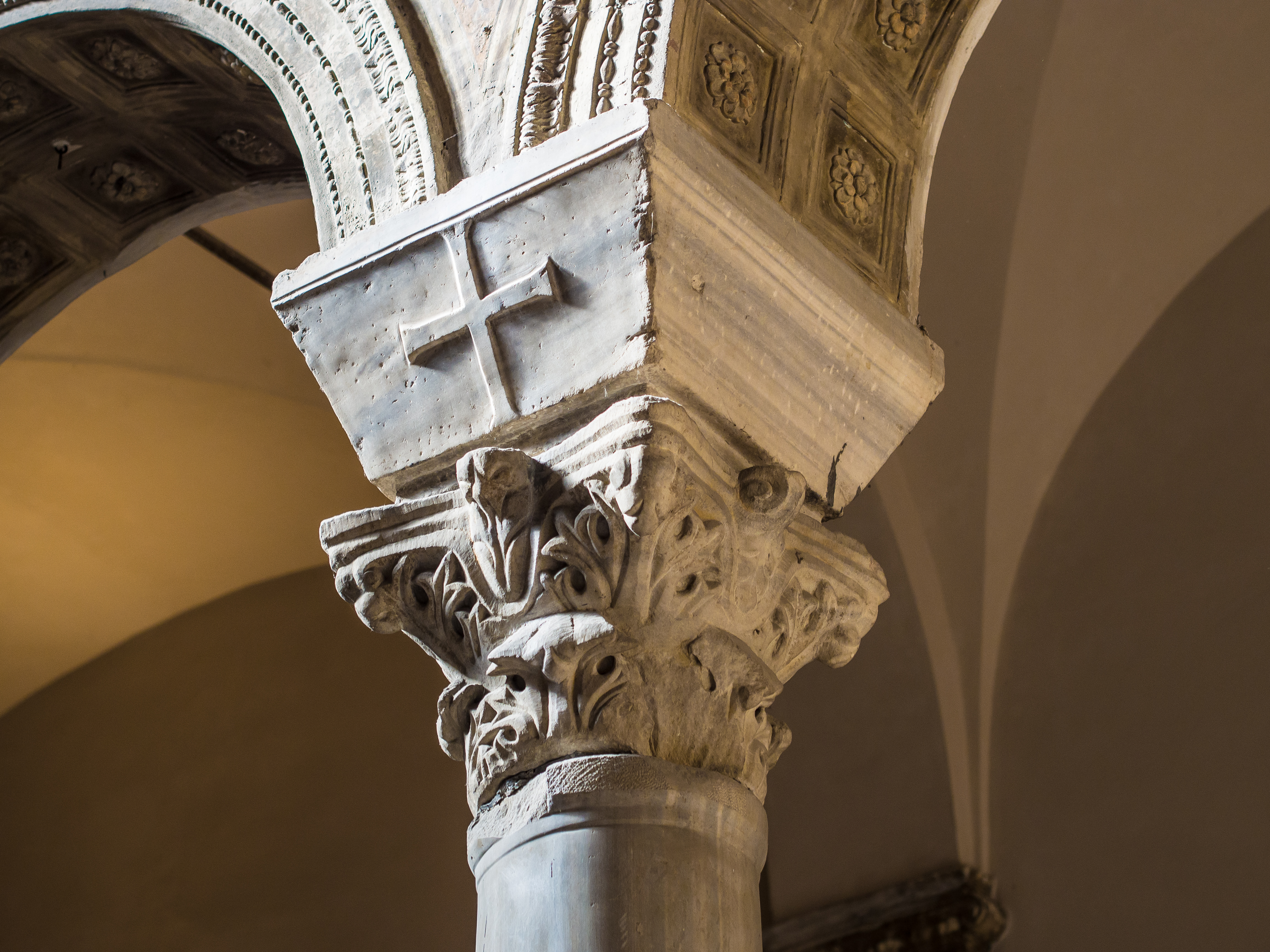
Byzantine composite column from Basilica of Sant'Apollinare Nuovo (Ravenna, Italy)

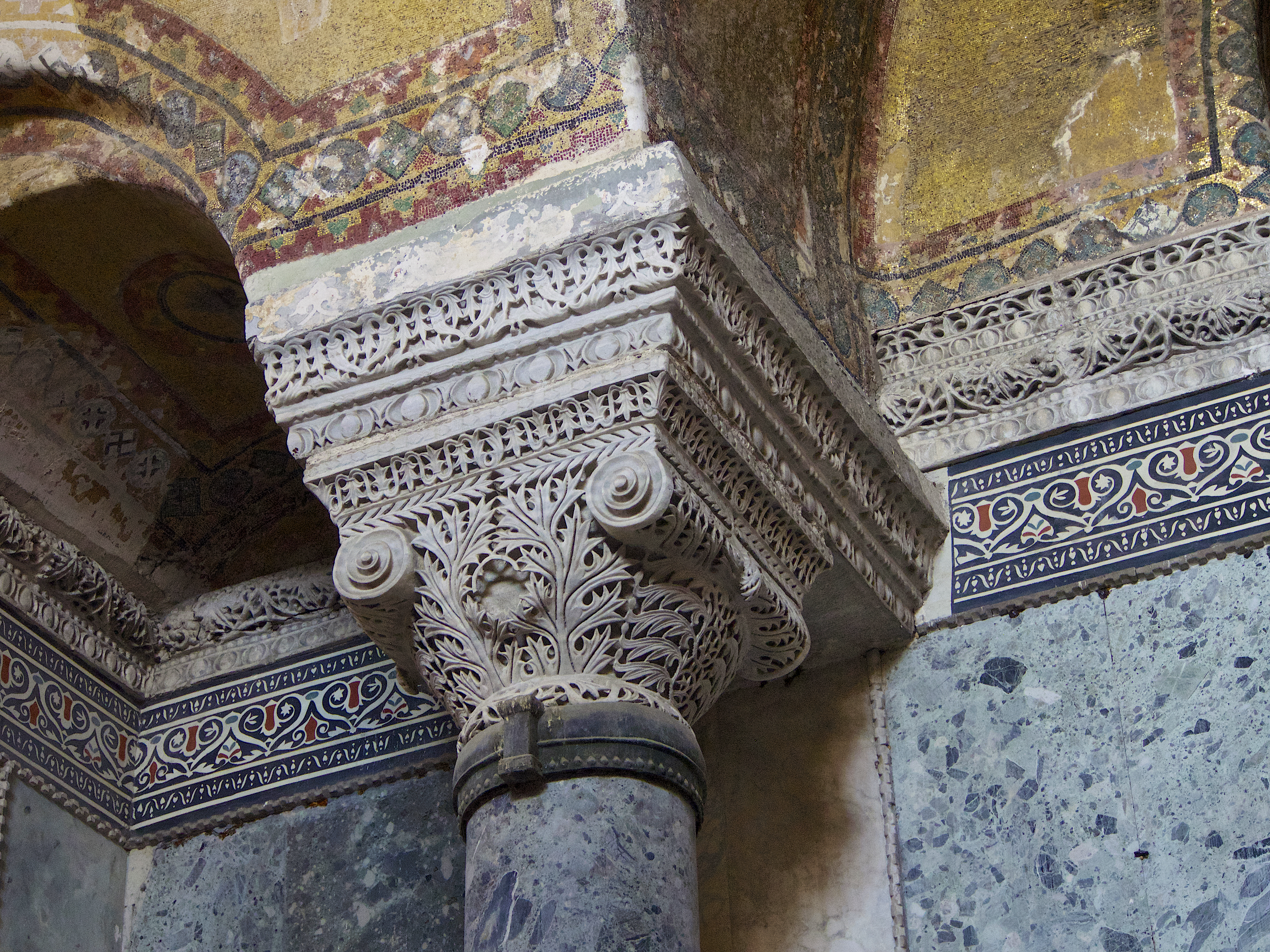
Byzantine basket column from Hagia Sophia (Istanbul, Turkey)

== Overview of extant monuments ==
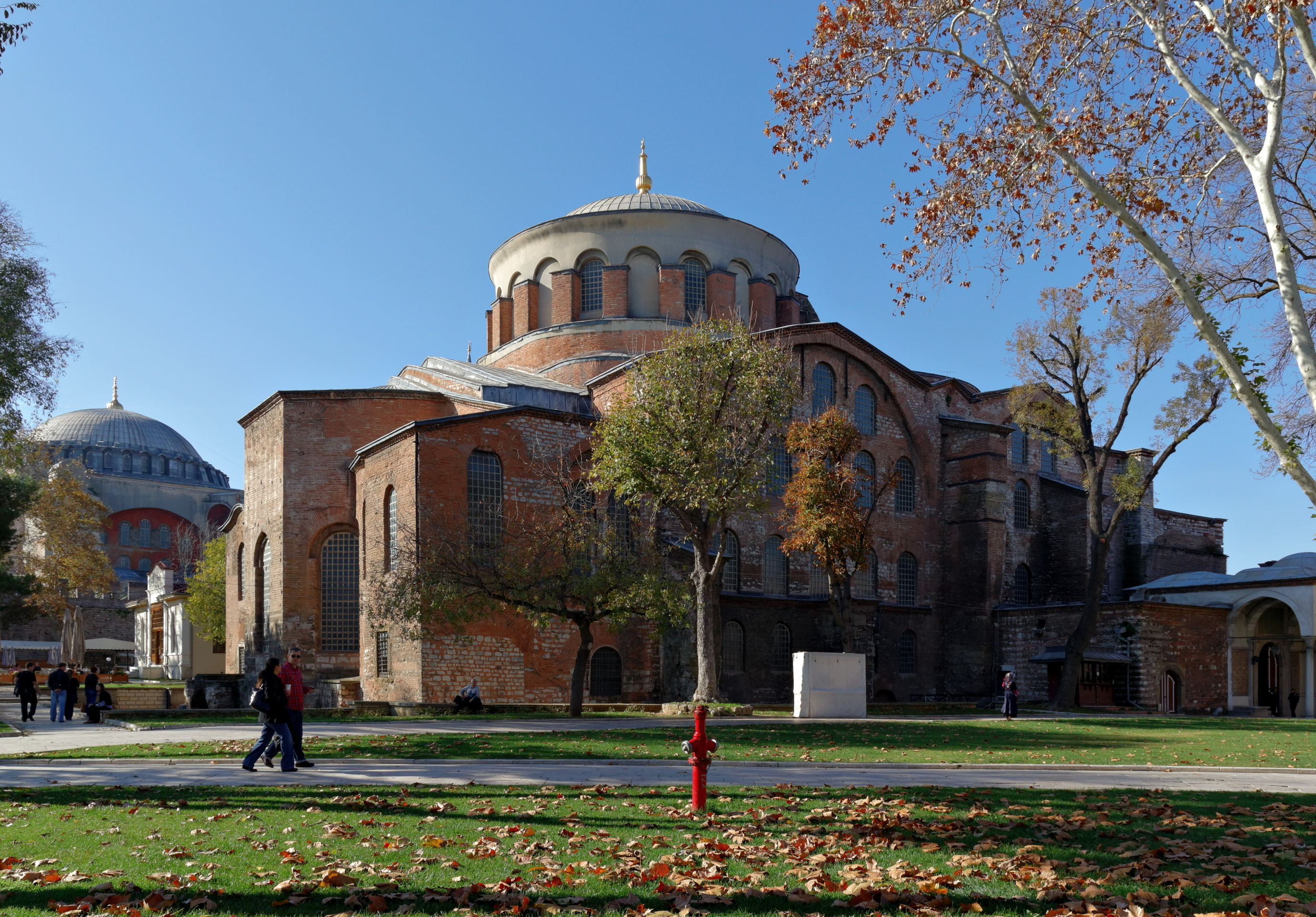
Hagia Irene is a former Greek Eastern Orthodox Church located in the outer courtyard of Topkapı Palace in Istanbul. It is one of only two Byzantine churches still standing in the city today which were never converted into mosques, as it was used as an arsenal until the 19th century. Today it operates as a museum and concert hall.

Buildings increased in geometric complexity, brick and plaster were used in addition to stone in the decoration of important public structures, classical orders were used more freely, mosaics replaced carved decoration, complex domes rested upon massive piers, and windows filtered light through thin sheets of alabaster to softly illuminate interiors. Most of the surviving structures are sacred, with secular buildings having been destroyed.

=== Early architecture ===
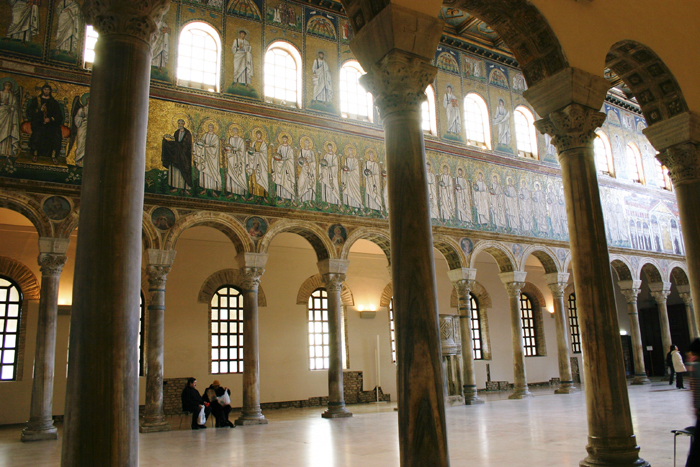
The basilica of Sant'Apollinare Nuovo in Ravenna (6th century)

Prime examples of early Byzantine architecture date from the Emperor Justinian I's reign and survive in Ravenna and Istanbul, as well as in Sofia (the Church of St Sophia).

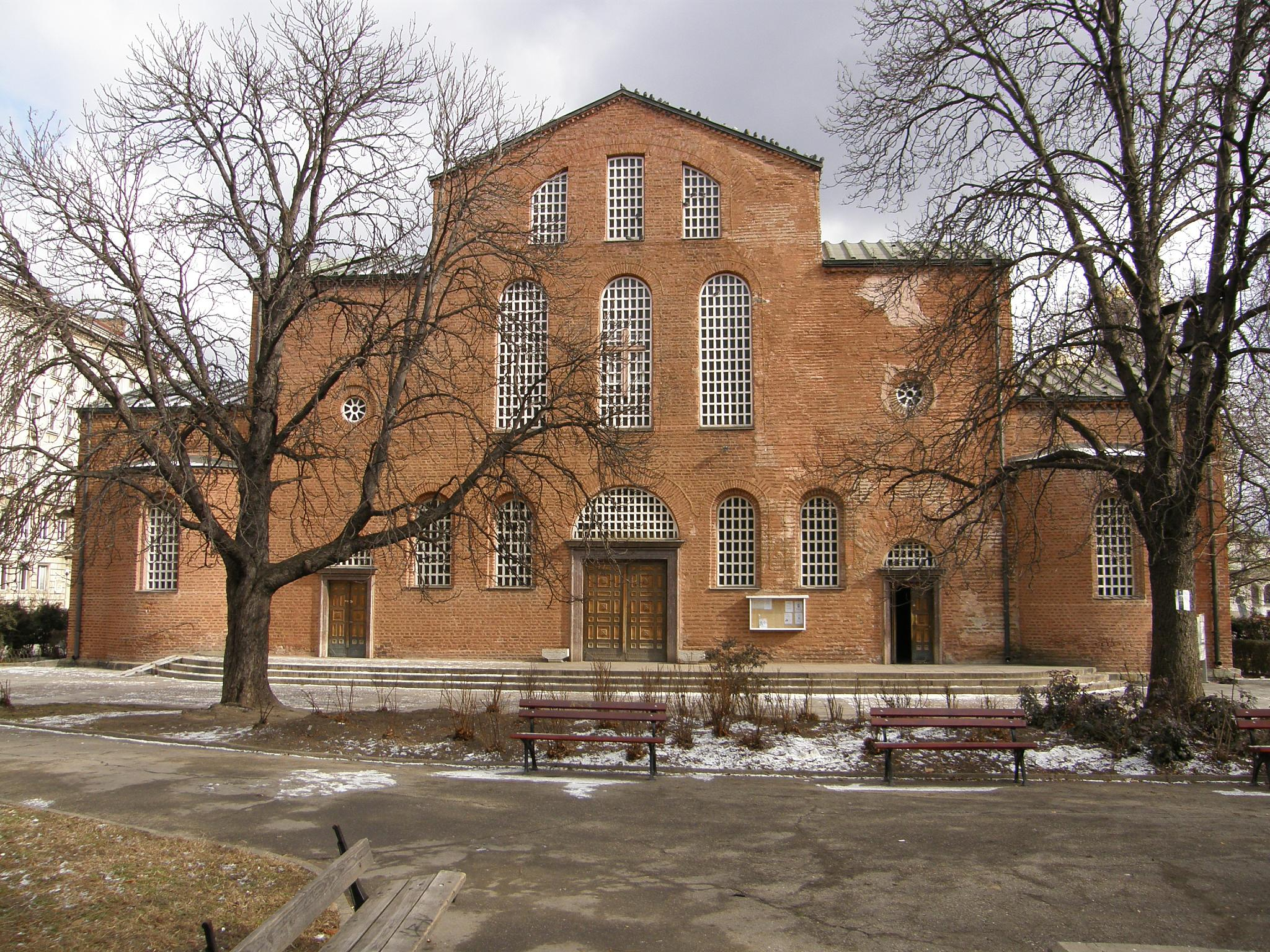
Saint Sofia Church, Bulgaria, 6th century AD

One of the great breakthroughs in the history of Western architecture occurred when Justinian's architects invented a complex system providing for a smooth transition from a square plan of the church to a circular dome (or domes) by means of pendentives.

In Ravenna, the longitudinal basilica of Sant'Apollinare Nuovo, and the octagonal, centralized structure of the church of San Vitale, commissioned by Emperor Justinian but never seen by him, was built. Justinian's monuments in Istanbul include the domed churches of Hagia Sophia and Hagia Irene (both discussed in more detail below), but there is also an earlier, smaller church of Saints Sergius and Bacchus (locally referred to as "Little Hagia Sophia"), which might have served as a model for both in that it combined the elements of a longitudinal basilica with those of a centralized building.

The 6th-century church of Hagia Irene in Istanbul was substantially rebuilt after an earthquake in the 8th century.

Other structures include the ruins of the Great Palace of Constantinople, the innovative walls of Constantinople (with 192 towers) and Basilica Cistern (with hundreds of recycled classical columns). A mosaic in the church begun by the Ostrogoths, San Apollinare in Nuovo in Ravenna, depicts an early Byzantine palace.

Hagios Demetrios in Thessaloniki, Saint Catherine's Monastery on Mount Sinai, Jvari Monastery in present-day Georgia, and three Armenian churches of Echmiadzin all date primarily from the 7th century and provide a glimpse on architectural developments in the Byzantine provinces following the age of Justinian.

Remarkable engineering feats include the 430 m long Sangarius Bridge, the pointed arch of Karamagara Bridge, as well as the dome of the Church of Hagia Sophia.

=== Middle Byzantine architecture ===
In the Macedonian dynasty, it is presumed that Basil I's votive church of the Theotokos of the Pharos and the Nea Ekklesia (both no longer existent) served as a model for most cross-in-square sanctuaries of the period, including the Cattolica di Stilo in southern Italy (9th century), the monastery church of Hosios Lukas in Greece (c. 1000), Nea Moni of Chios (a pet project of Constantine IX), and the Daphni Monastery near Athens (c. 1050). All three of the later churches display the important shifts in architectural design that occurred following the end of Iconoclasm, when architectural design and decoration became more standardized.

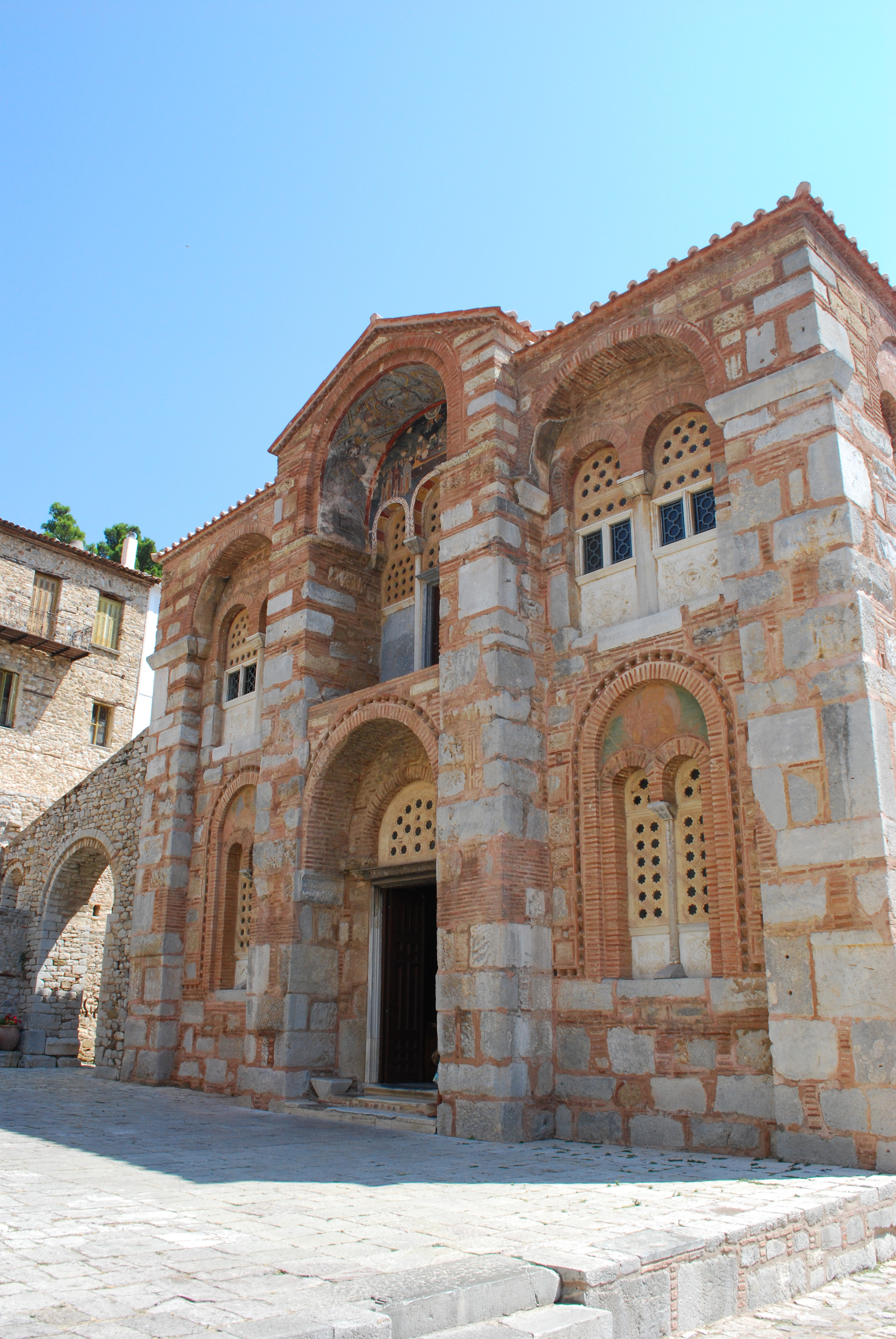
External view of the 11th-century monastery of Hosios Loukas in Greece. It is representative of the Byzantine art during the rule of the Macedonian dynasty (Macedonian art)

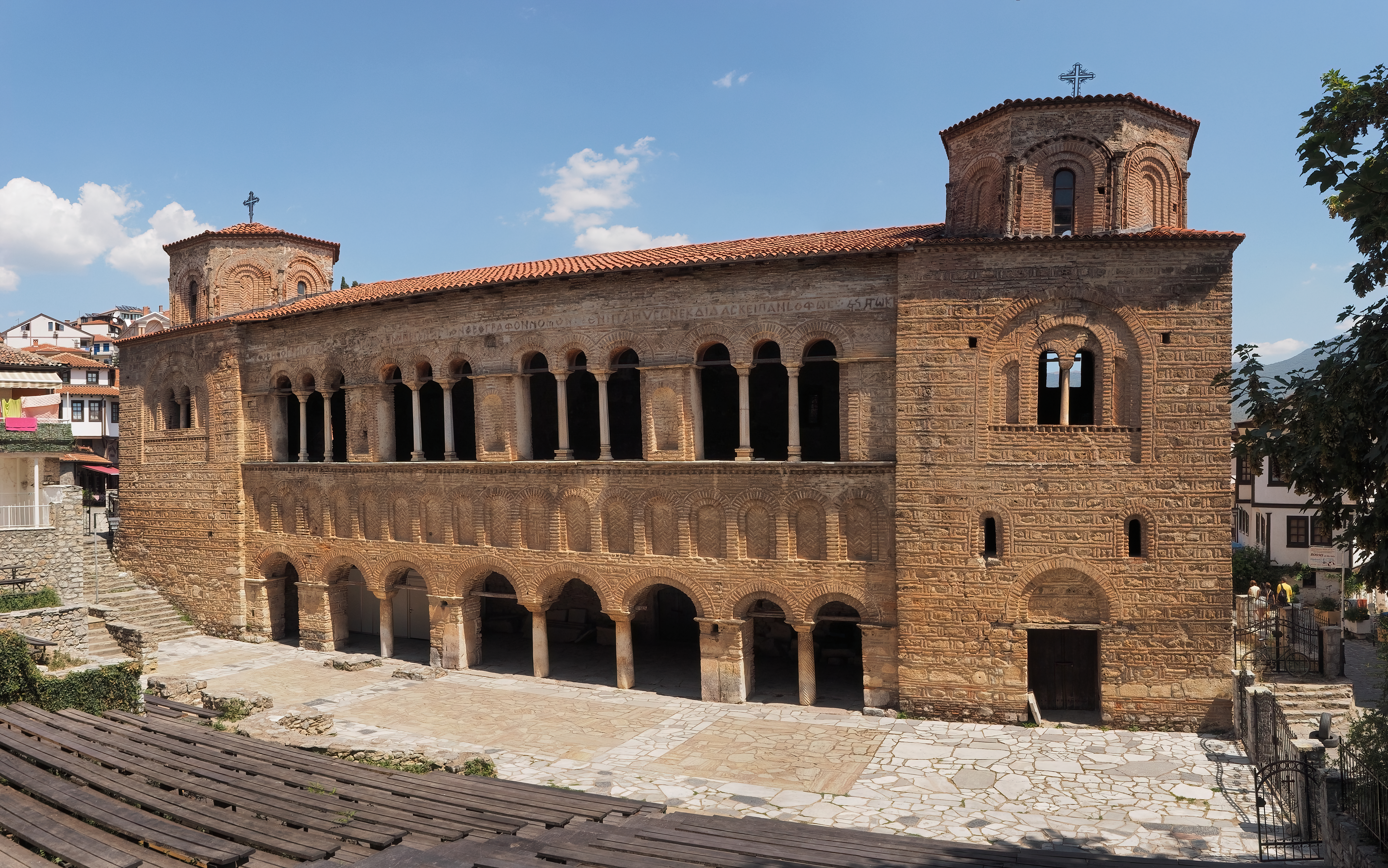
Rear courtyard of Church of St. Sophia, Ohrid, 9th century, First Bulgarian Empire, now North Macedonia

The Hagia Sophia church in Ochrid (present-day North Macedonia), built in the First Bulgarian Empire in the time of Boris I of Bulgaria, and eponymous cathedral in Kiev (present-day Ukraine) testify to a vogue for multiple subsidiary domes set on drums, which would gain in height and narrowness with the progress of time.

==== Comnenian and Paleologan periods ====
In Istanbul and Asia Minor the architecture of the Komnenian period is almost non-existent, with the notable exceptions of the Elmali Kilise and other rock sanctuaries of Cappadocia, and of the Churches of the Pantokrator and of the Theotokos Kyriotissa in Istanbul. Most examples of this architectural style and many of the other older Byzantine styles only survive on the outskirts of the Byzantine world, as most significant and ancient churches and buildings were in Asia Minor. During World War I, almost all churches that ended up within the Turkish borders were destroyed or converted into mosques. Some were abandoned as a result of the Greek and Christian genocides from 1915 to 1923. Similar styles can be found in countries such as Bulgaria, Croatia, North Macedonia, Russia, Serbia and other Slavic lands, as well as in Sicily (Cappella Palatina) and Veneto (St Mark's Basilica, Torcello Cathedral).

In Middle Byzantine architecture "cloisonné masonry" refers to walls built with a regular mix of stone and brick, often with more of the latter. The exterior of the 11th- or 12th-century Pammakaristos Church in Istanbul is an example, though it is even more renowned for Late Byzantine additions discussed below.

=== Late Byzantine architecture ===
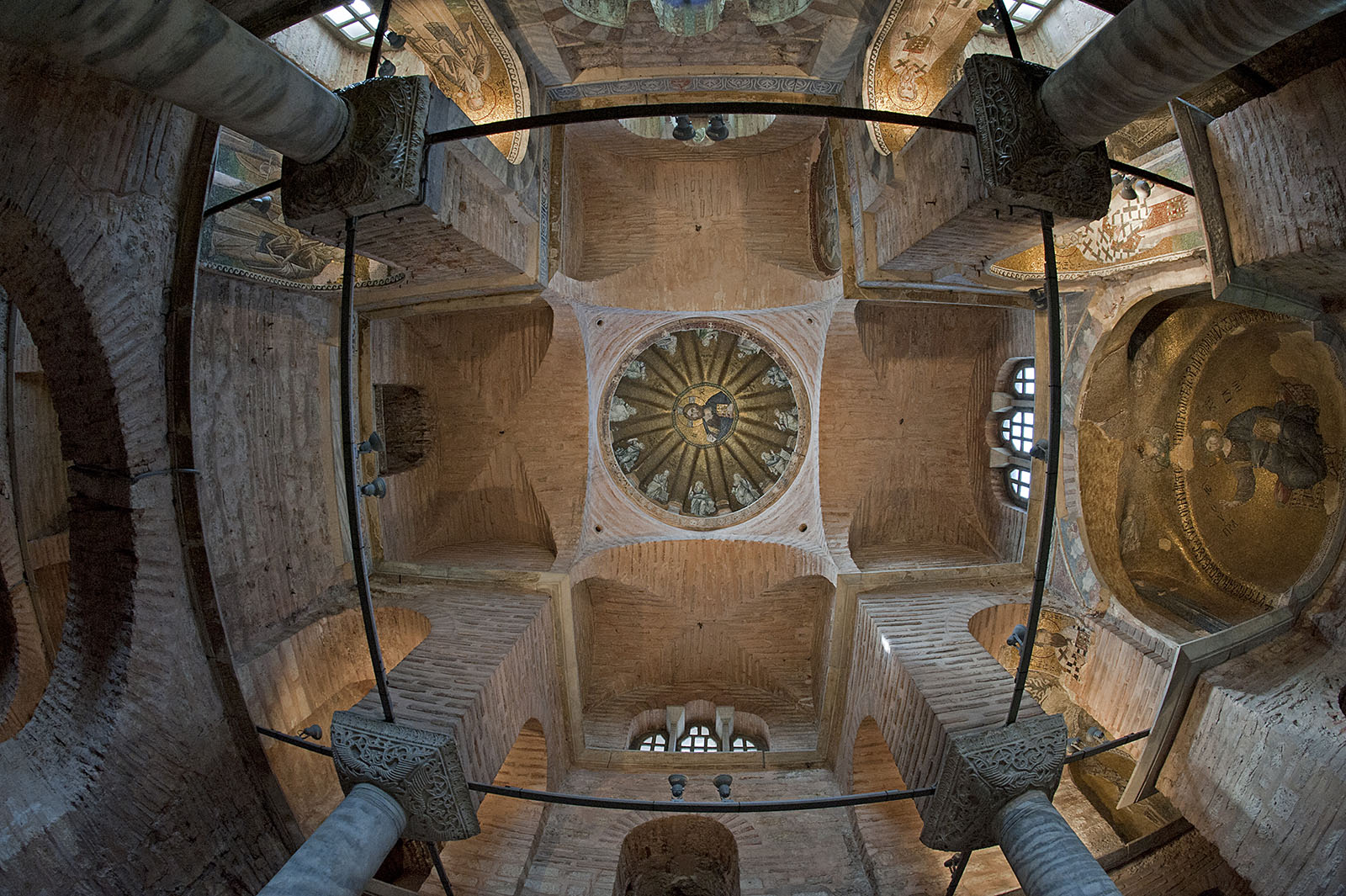
Dome of the Pammakaristos Church, Istanbul

The Paleologan period is well represented in a dozen former churches in Istanbul, notably St Saviour at Chora and St Mary Pammakaristos. Unlike their Slavic counterparts, the Paleologan architects never accented the vertical thrust of structures. As a result, the late medieval architecture of Byzantium (barring the Hagia Sophia of Trebizond) is less prominent in height.

The Church of the Holy Apostles, Thessaloniki is cited as an archetypal structure of the late period with its exterior walls intricately decorated with complex brickwork patterns or with glazed ceramics. Other churches from the years immediately predating the fall of Constantinople survive on Mount Athos and in Mistra (e.g. Brontochion Monastery). That site also has preserved secular architecture such as the Palace of the Despots and several houses.

In the late Byzantine period, c. 1310, a highly ornate parekklesion was added to the Pammakaristos Church in Constantinople for the tomb of Michael Glabas Tarchaniotes, a Byzantine aristocrat and general who lived c. 1235 to c. 1305–08. It displays the attenuated proportions favored in the late Byzantine era, as well as shifts in style in the mosaics' treatment of figures.

== Residential buildings ==
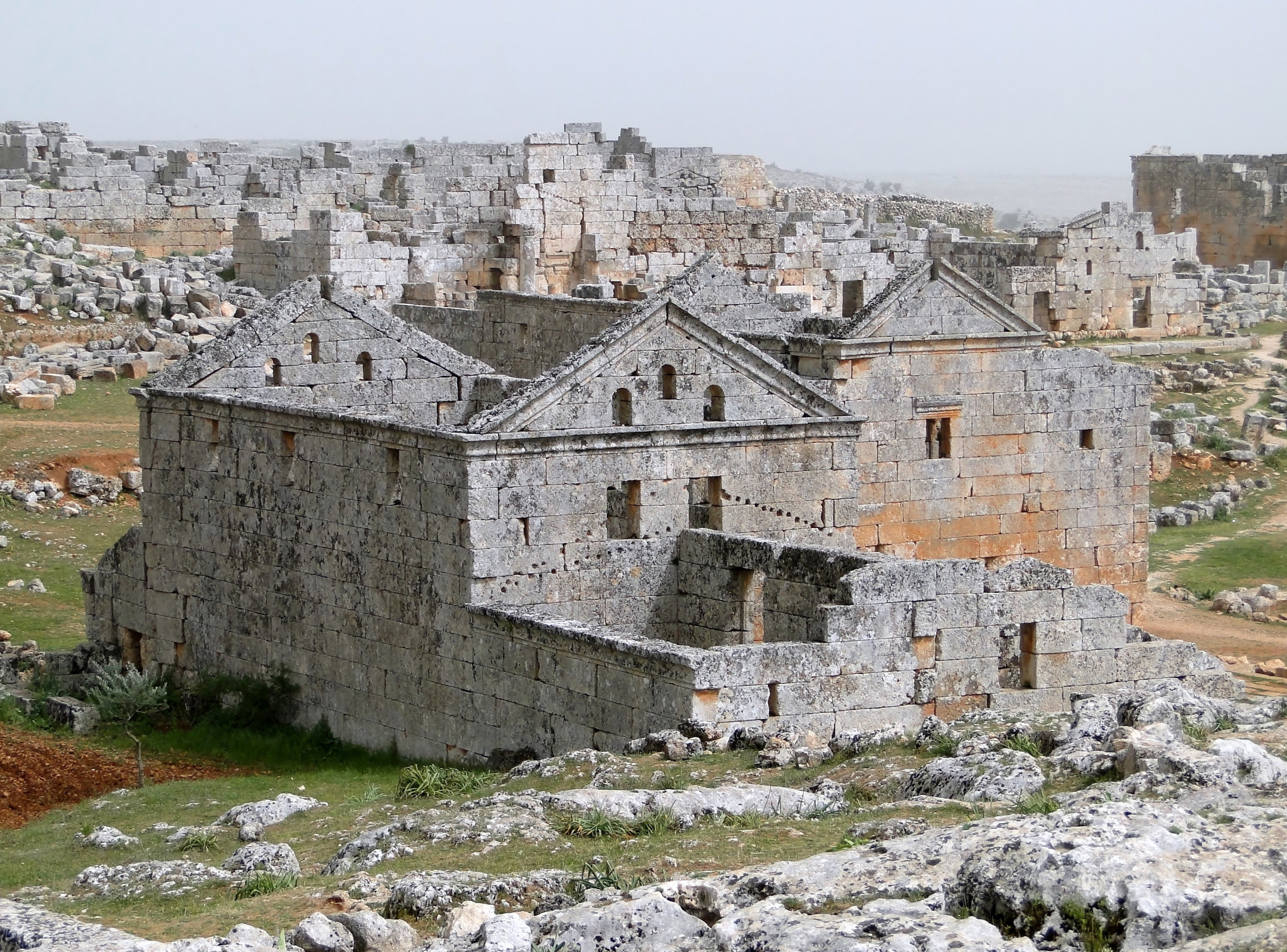
An example of a house in Byzantine Syria. People lived on the second floor while their animals resided on the ground floor

Building materials and structure

The building materials utilised in the construction of houses varied throughout the empire, with most builders favouring cheaper and more accessible materials. Stone, mud brick, timber and thatch were predominantly used, in some areas together with roof tiles and bricks. Entire villages in Northern Syria were constructed of meticulously cut blocks of limestone, while builders in Egypt primarily used sun-dried mud bricks comprising river silt and straw. Irregular fieldstones were the main material used throughout Asia Minor and the Balkans. Villagers residing in close proximity to towns/cities could purchase kiln-fired bricks and roof tiles from local manufacturers, though they sometimes made their own. Construction materials were often mixed, with heavy fieldstones and bricks being used in the foundation and the lower wall. The upper wall and second storey was generally built using mud bricks or compressed earth reinforced by timber framing. A generous coating of lime or mud was applied on uneven surfaces to shield them from weathering, and roofs were generally sloped with timber beams bolstering flat stones and tiles. Multiple layers of thatch would have been practical for houses and barns, especially those in the mountains.

Layout and interior

A regular house suitable for a single family generally had three or four rooms facing a small yard enclosed by a wall. Livestock were stored in the enclosure, which included a few fruit trees, a grapevine and a garden. One or two rooms were allocated for the storage of food and household goods. Living and sleeping quarters were separated, and cisterns/wells provided access to water. The plumbing that the average Byzantine had were generally limited to drains. Grain, preserved foods and oil were stored in another room, with flour being stored in large earthenware jars. Regarding the interior of houses, windows were generally small, and heavy curtains and wood shutters were equipped to regulate the temperature in winter and summer seasons. Floors were covered with mats, and houses of greater quality had stone slabs/tiles. Important spaces were decorated by colorful rugs. People sat on benches or on the floor, and a small wood table was used for dining. Most families kept at least one room for receiving guests. Religious objects generally decorated one corner, and it included candles, terra-cotta lamps, icons, bronze amulets and jewellery. A bed was generally a wood-frame structure supporting a straw mattress, although in some cases benches that were built against a wall were used as a sleeping platform. A cabinet/chest was used to store money and other valuables. Lastly, cooking was conducted on a portable iron brazier or in a brick oven.

== Structural evolution ==
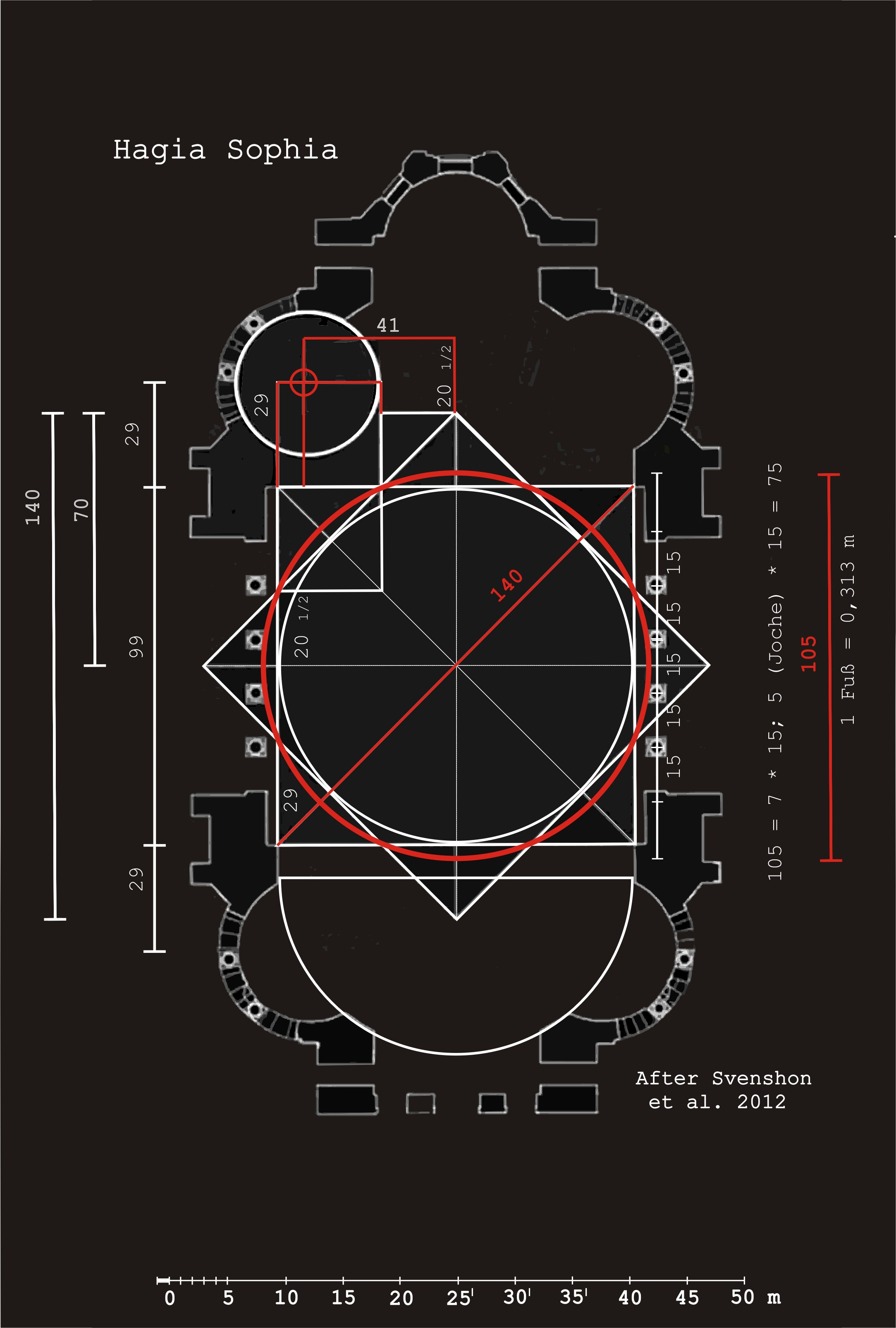
The geometric conception of the Hagia Sophia is based on mathematical formulas of Heron of Alexandria. It avoids use of irrational numbers for square diagonals and circle circumferences and contrieves thus a highly elaborated mathematical space

As early as the building of Constantine's churches in Palestine there were two chief types of plan in use: the basilican, or axial, type, represented by the basilica at the Holy Sepulchre, and the circular, or central, type, represented by the great octagonal church once at Antioch.

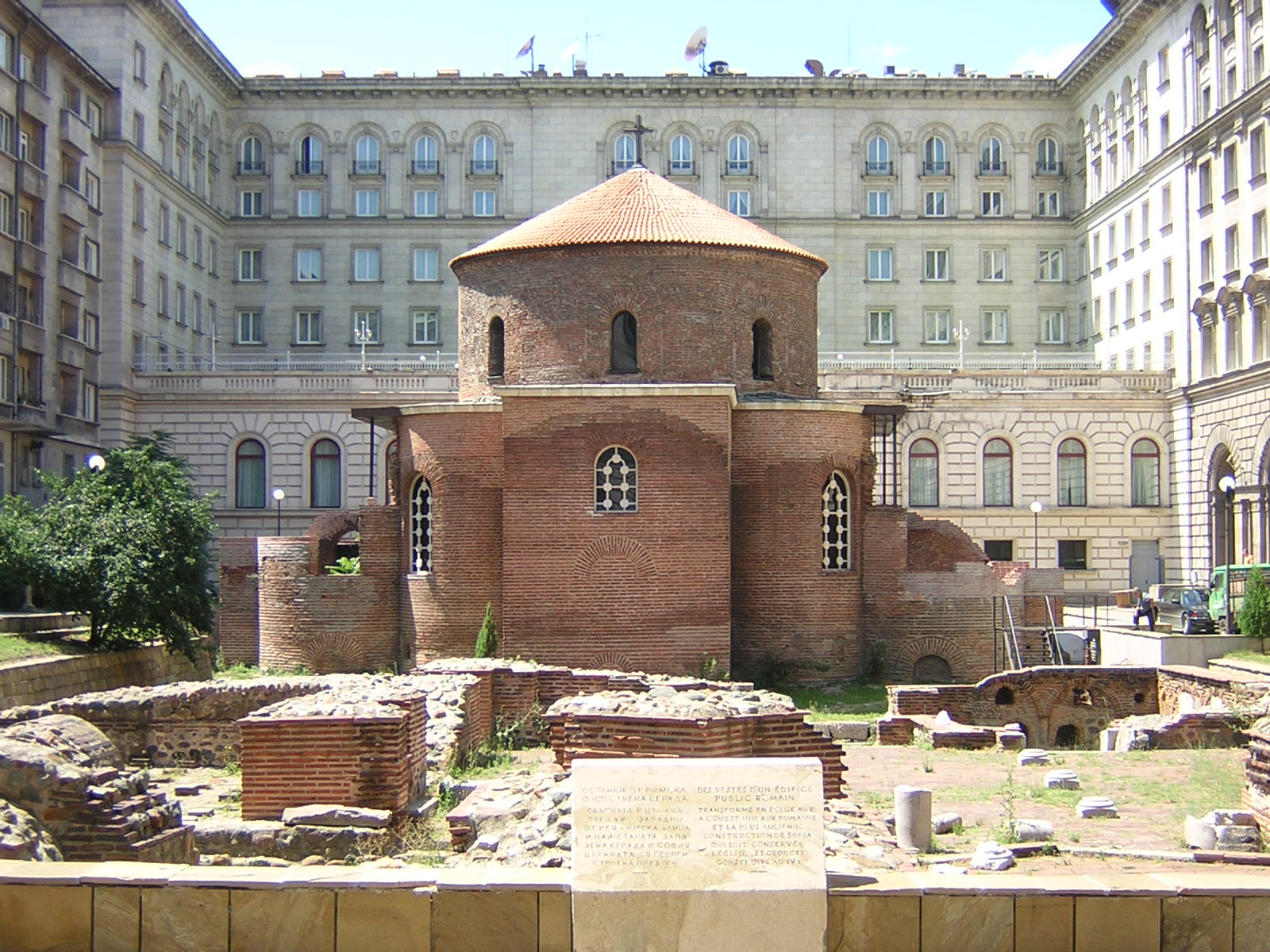
The St. George Rotunda; some remains of Serdica can be seen in the foreground

Those of the latter type we must suppose were nearly always vaulted, for a central dome would seem to furnish their very purpose. The central space was sometimes surrounded by a very thick wall, in which deep recesses, to the interior, were formed, as at Church of St. George, Sofia, built by the Romans in the 4th century as a cylindrical domed structure built on a square base, and the noble Church of Saint George, Thessaloniki (5th century), or by a vaulted aisle, as at Santa Costanza, Rome (4th century); or annexes were thrown out from the central space in such a way as to form a cross, in which these additions helped to counterpoise the central vault, as at the Mausoleum of Galla Placidia, Ravenna (5th century). The Holy Apostles, Constantinople was off this type. Vaults appear to have been early applied to the basilican type of plan; for instance, at Hagia Irene, Constantinople (6th century), the long body of the church is covered by two domes.

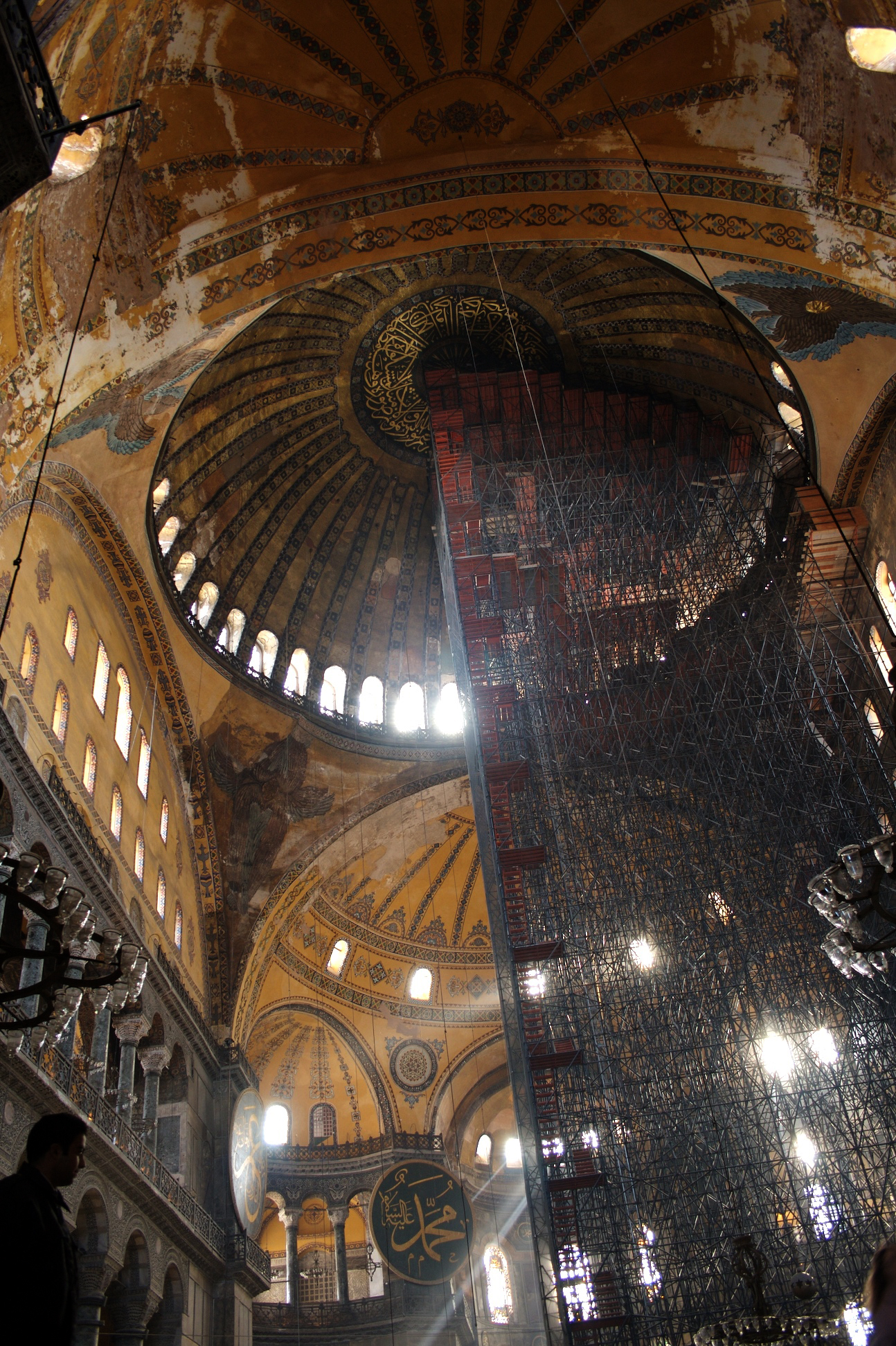
Interior of the Hagia Sophia under renovation, showing many features of the grandest Byzantine architecture.

At Saint Sergius, Constantinople, and San Vitale, Ravenna, churches of the central type, the space under the dome was enlarged by having apsidal additions made to the octagon. Finally, at Hagia Sophia (6th century) a combination was made which is perhaps the most remarkable piece of planning ever contrived. A central space of 100 ft (30 m) square is increased to 200 ft (60 m) in length by adding two hemicycles to it to the east and the west; these are again extended by pushing out three minor apses eastward, and two others, one on either side of a straight extension, to the west. This unbroken area, about 260 ft (80 m) long, the larger part of which is over 100 ft (30 m) wide, is entirely covered by a system of domical surfaces. Above the conchs of the small apses rise the two great semi-domes which cover the hemicycles, and between these bursts out the vast dome over the central square. On the two sides, to the north and south of the dome, it is supported by vaulted aisles in two stories which bring the exterior form to a general square.

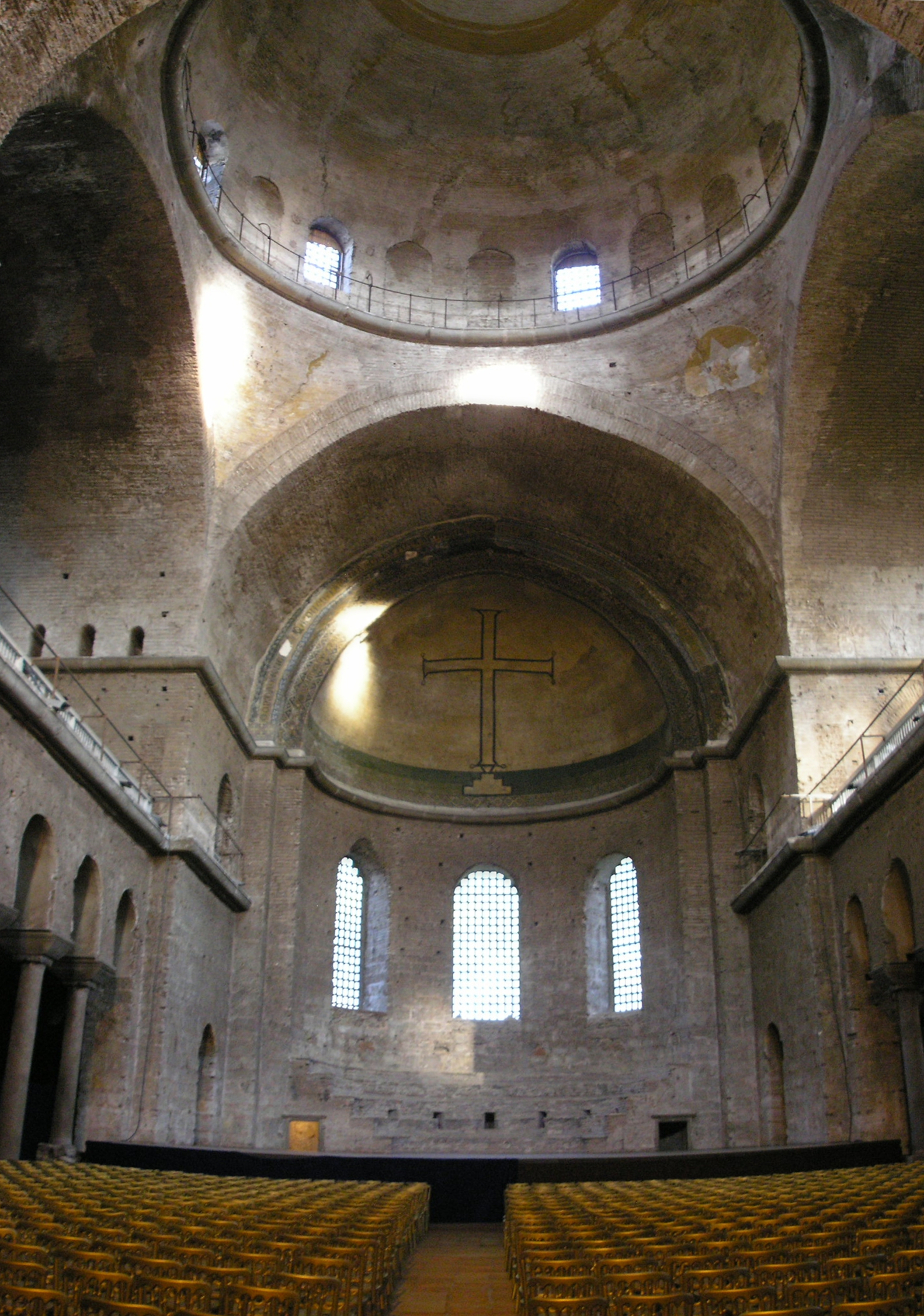
The apse of the church with cross at Hagia Irene. Nearly all the decorative surfaces in the church have been lost.

At the Holy Apostles (6th century) five domes were applied to a cruciform plan; the central dome was the highest. After the 6th century there were no churches built which in any way competed in scale with these great works of Justinian, and the plans more or less tended to approximate to one type. The central area covered by the dome was included in a considerably larger square, of which the four divisions, to the east, west, north and south, were carried up higher in the vaulting and roof system than the four corners, forming in this way a sort of nave and transepts. Sometimes the central space was square, sometimes octagonal, or at least there were eight piers supporting the dome instead of four, and the nave and transepts were narrower in proportion.

If we draw a square and divide each side into three so that the middle parts are greater than the others, and then divide the area into nine from these points, we approximate to the typical setting out of a plan of this time. Now add three apses on the east side opening from the three divisions, and opposite to the west put a narrow entrance porch running right across the front. Still in front put a square court. The court is the atrium and usually has a fountain in the middle under a canopy resting on pillars. The entrance porch is the narthex. Directly under the center of the dome is the ambo, from which the Scriptures were proclaimed, and beneath the ambo at floor level was the place for the choir of singers. Across the eastern side of the central square was a screen which divided off the bema, where the altar was situated, from the body of the church; this screen, bearing images, is the iconostasis. The altar was protected by a canopy or ciborium resting on pillars. Rows of rising seats around the curve of the apse with the patriarch's throne at the middle eastern point formed the synthronon. The two smaller compartments and apses at the sides of the bema were sacristies, the diaconicon and prothesis. The ambo and bema were connected by the solea, a raised walkway enclosed by a railing or low wall.

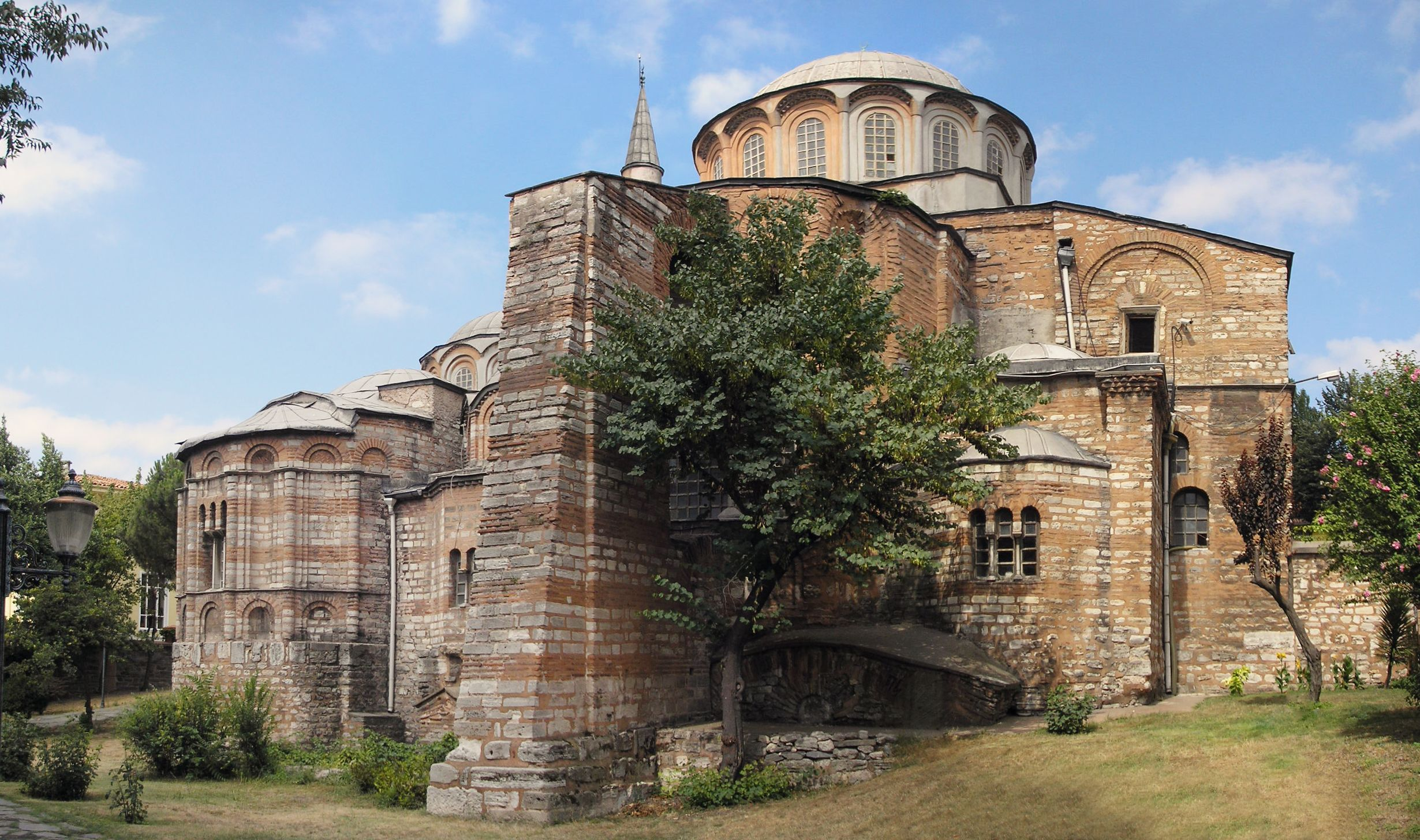
The Chora a medieval Byzantine Greek Orthodox church now the Kariye Mosque in the Edirnekapı neighborhood of Istanbul

The continuous influence from the East is widely shown in the fashion of decorating external brick walls of churches built about the 12th century, in which bricks roughly carved into form are set up so as to make bands of ornamentation which it is quite clear are imitated from Cufic writing. This fashion was associated with the disposition of the exterior brick and stone work generally into many varieties of pattern, zig-zags, key-patterns etc.; and, as similar decoration is found in many Persian buildings, it is probable that this custom also was derived from the East. The domes and vaults to the exterior were covered with lead or with tiling of regional variety. The window and door frames were of marble. The interior surfaces were adorned all over by mosaics or frescoes in the higher parts of the edifice, and below with incrustations of marble slabs, which were frequently of very beautiful varieties, and disposed so that, although in one surface, the coloring formed a series of large panels. The better marbles were opened out so that the two surfaces produced by the division formed a symmetrical pattern.

== Legacy and influences ==
=== In the West ===
Ultimately, Byzantine architecture in the West gave way to the Carolingian (Pre-Romansque), Romanesque, and Gothic architecture. The Palatine Chapel of Charlemagne in Aachen, Germany, is an example of the pre-Romanesque Carolingian architecture which was highly influenced by Byzantine architecture as it was modeled after the Byzantine Basilica of San Vitale. An example of the Byzantine-influenced Venetian Gothic architecture is the St Mark's Basilica in Venice which shows many Byzantine Characteristics. The influence on Romansque architecture is visible on the churches of Aquitaine region in France where the influence is apparent by the use of pendentives, the influence is especially apparent in the St Front Cathedral in Périgueux.

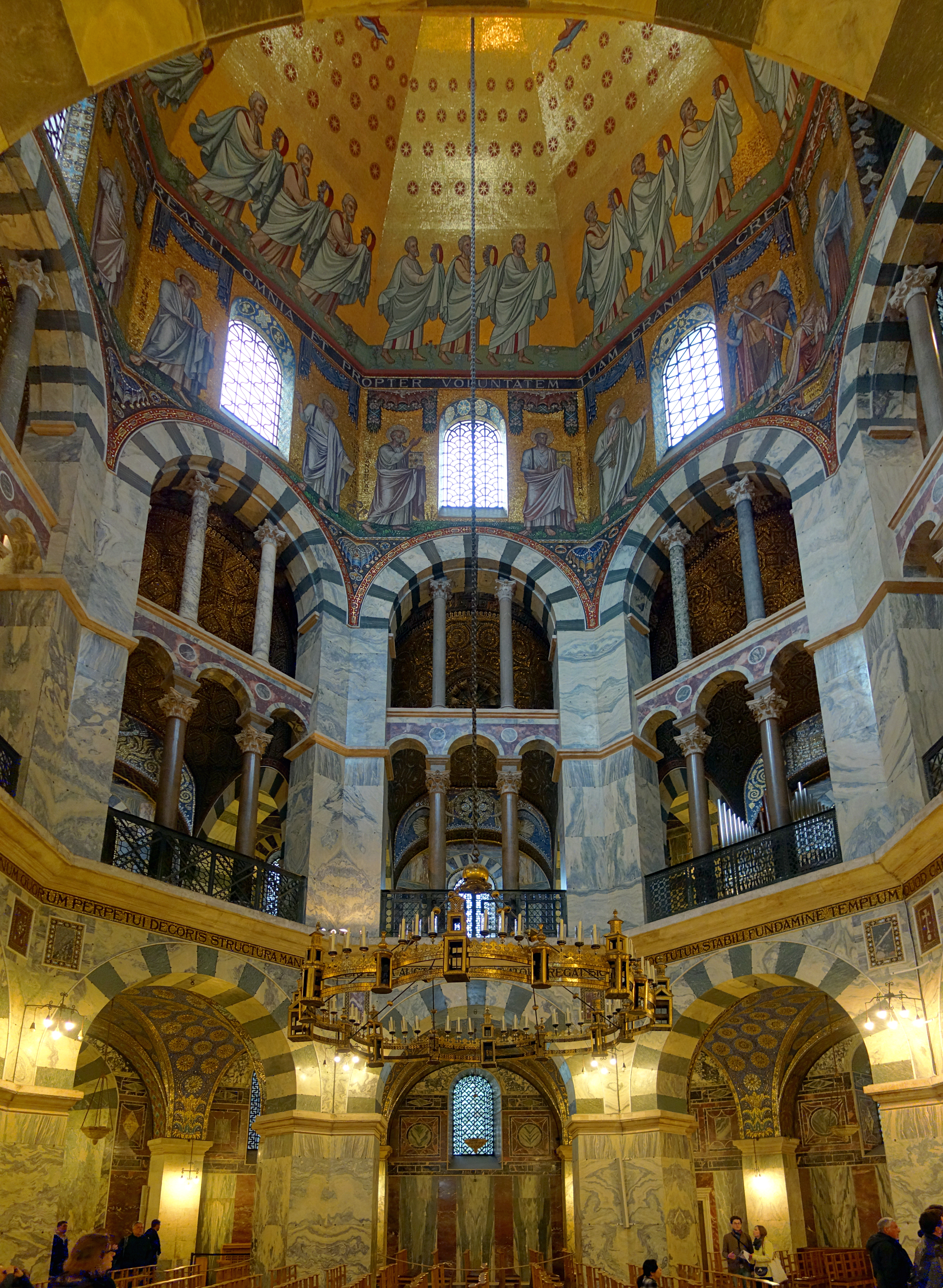
The Palatine Chapel in Aachen, Germany

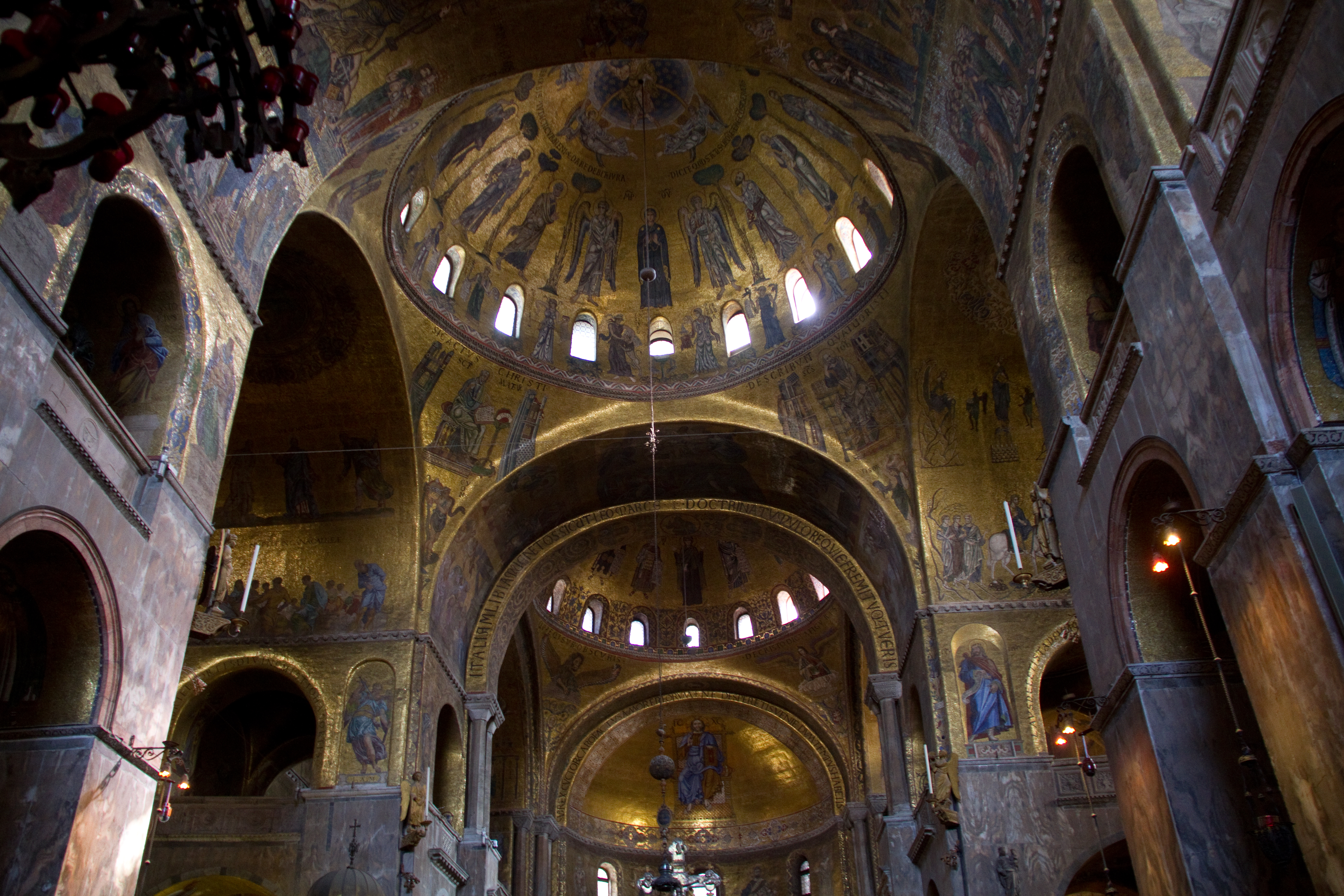
St Mark’s Basilica in Venice, Italy

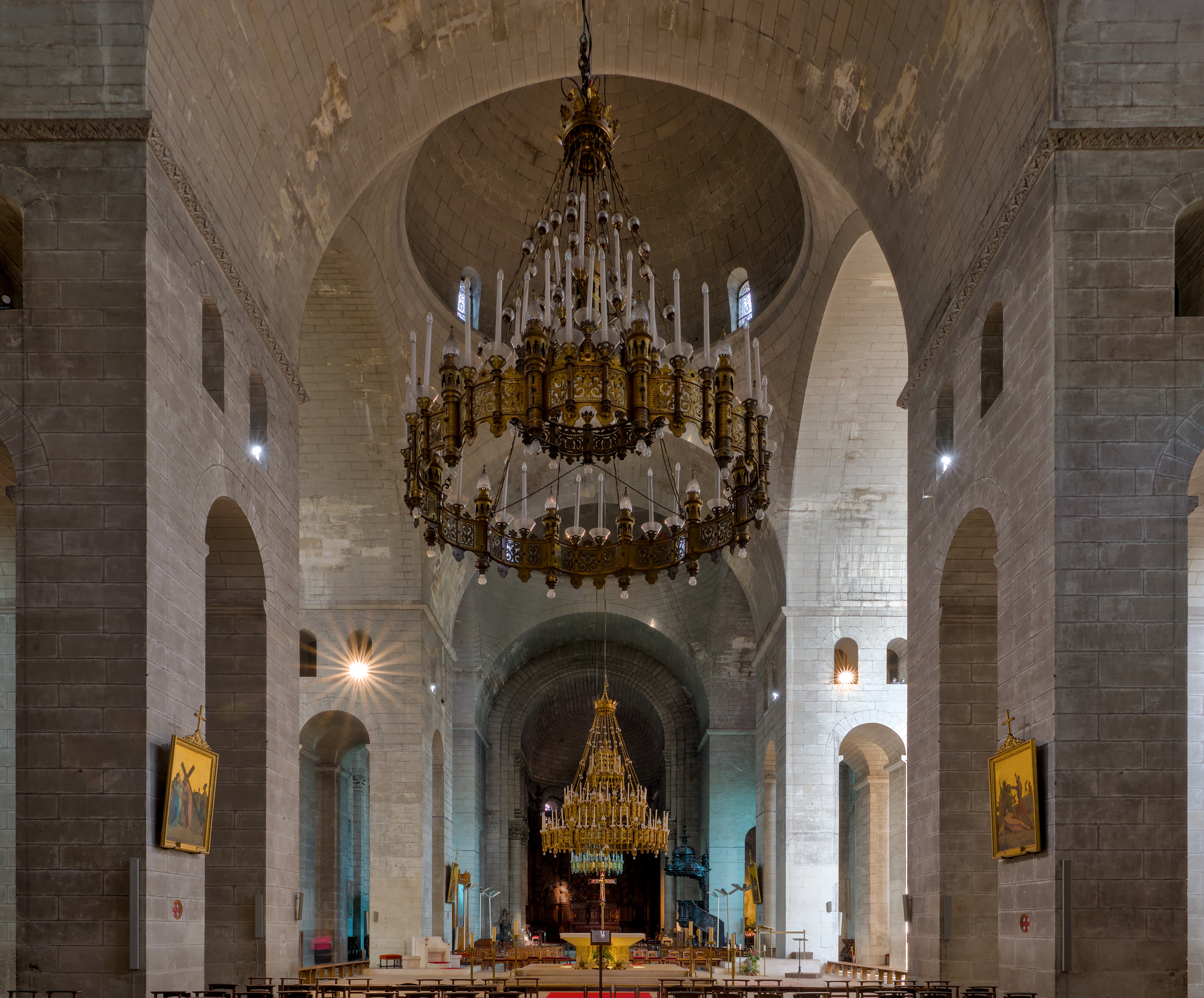
St Front Cathedral in Périgueux, France

=== In the East ===
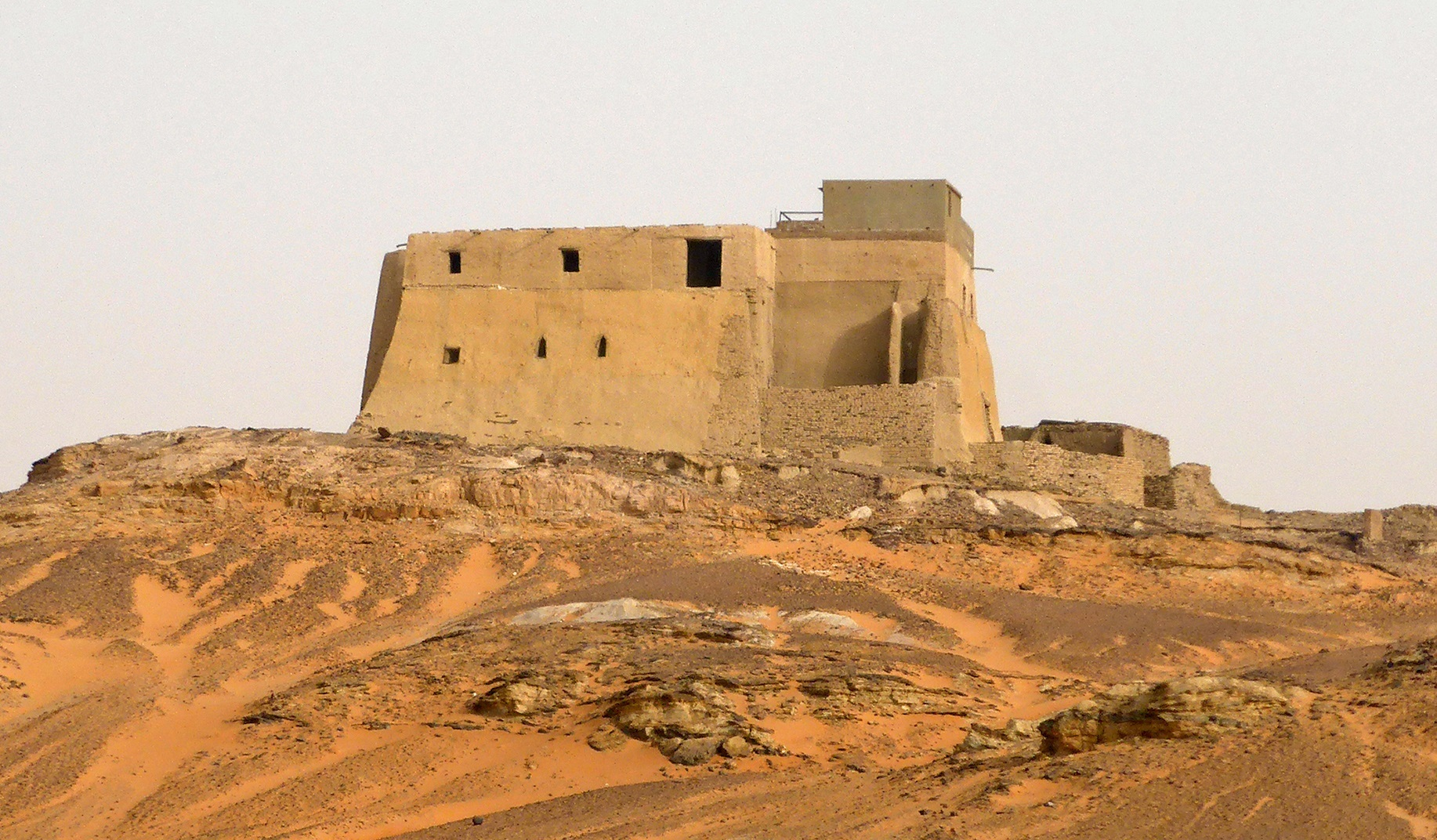
The 9th century Throne Hall of Dongola in Sudan was heavily influenced by Byzantine architecture.

As for the East, Byzantine architectural tradition exerted a profound influence on early Islamic architecture, particularly Umayyad architecture where the use of mosaics contributed to the development of a distinct Islamic Umayyad style of mosaics that generally avoided human figural representation, although animal representations can be found in some Umayyad palaces. Byzantine architecture has also influenced the later Ottoman architecture, where it appears in early Ottoman mosques like the 14th century Orhan Gazi Mosque. This influence became particularly evident in the monumental dome architecture of the later imperial Ottoman mosque complexes. The tile work, geometric patterns, multiple arches, domes, and polychrome brick and stone work that characterize Muslim and Moorish architecture were influenced heavily by Byzantine architecture.

=== Post-Byzantine architecture in Eastern Orthodox countries ===
In Bulgaria, Greece, Serbia, Romania, North Macedonia, Belarus, Georgia, Ukraine, Russia and other Orthodox countries the Byzantine architecture persisted even longer, from the 16th up to the 18th centuries, giving birth to local post-Byzantine schools of architecture.

- In Medieval Bulgaria: The Preslav and Tarnovo architectural schools.
- In Medieval Serbia: Raška architectural school, Vardar architectural school and Morava architectural school.
- In Medieval Russia: Architecture in Kievan Rus' and the Moscow architectural school
- In Medieval Ukraine: Architecture in Kievan Rus'
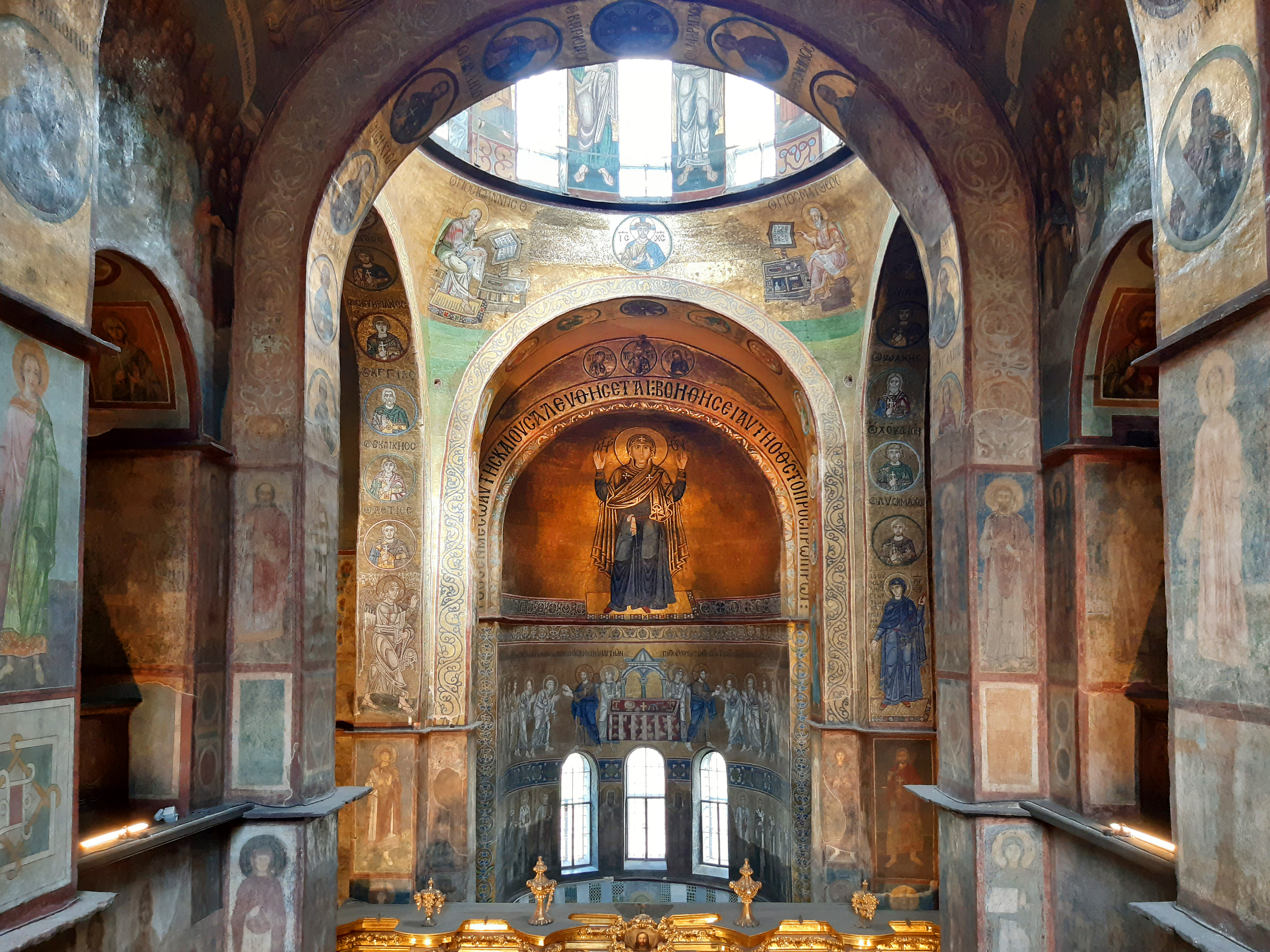
  Saint Sophia Cathedral, Kyiv, Ukraine
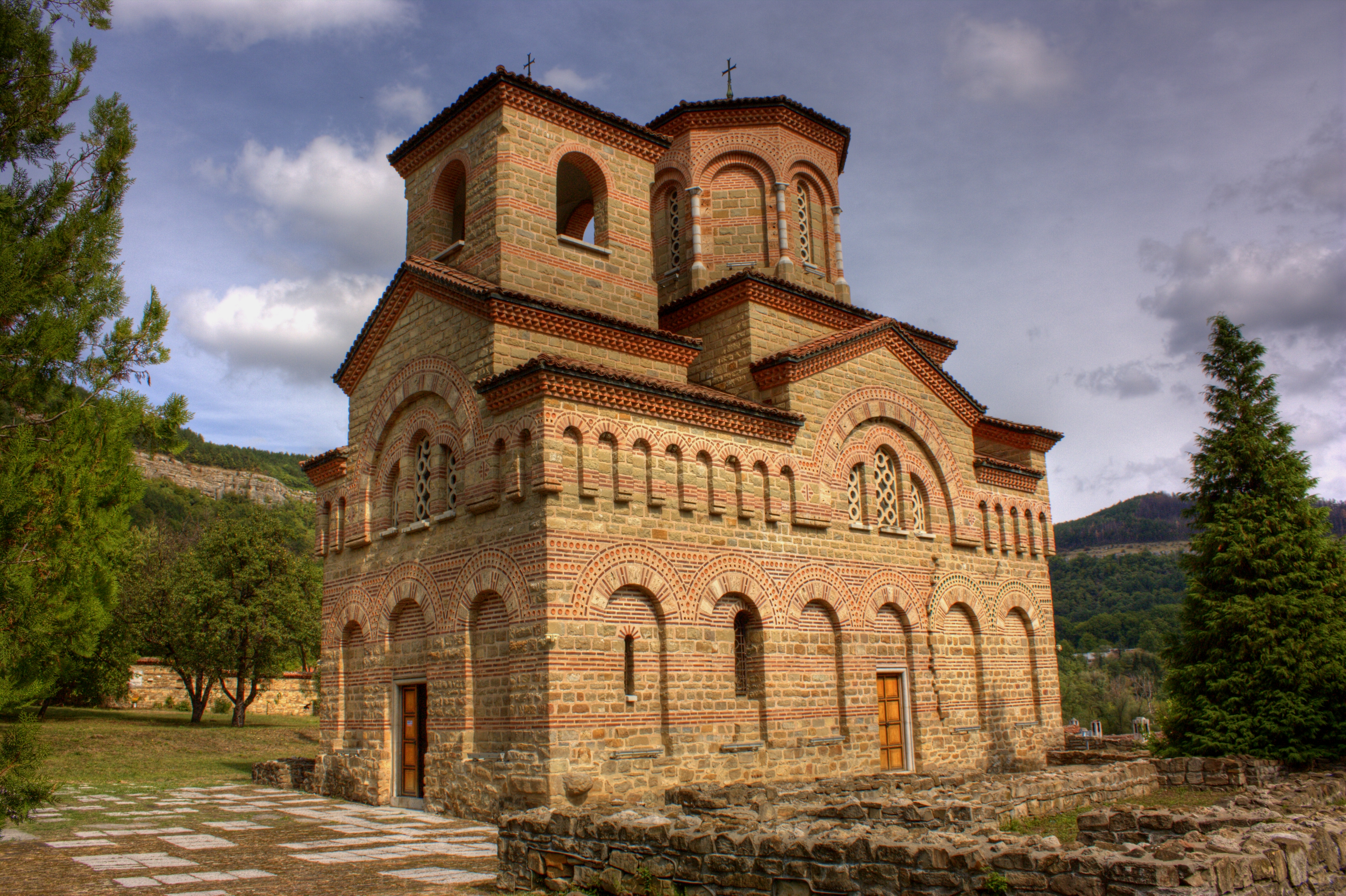
  Church of Saint Demetrius of Thessaloniki, Veliko Tarnovo, Bulgaria
  Gelati Monastery near Kutaisi, Georgia. The fresco scenes reflect a strong Byzantine influence.

=== Neo-Byzantine architecture ===
Neo-Byzantine architecture was followed in the wake of the 19th-century Gothic revival, resulting in such jewels as Westminster Cathedral in London, and in Bristol from about 1850 to 1880 a related style known as Bristol Byzantine was popular for industrial buildings which combined elements of the Byzantine style with Moorish architecture. It was developed on a wide-scale basis in Russia during the reign of Alexander II by Grigory Gagarin and his followers who designed St Volodymyr's Cathedral in Kyiv, St Nicholas Naval Cathedral in Kronstadt, Alexander Nevsky Cathedral in Sofia, Saint Mark's church in Belgrade and the New Athos Monastery in New Athos near Sukhumi. The largest Neo-Byzantine project of the 20th century was the Church of Saint Sava in Belgrade.

== Important Byzantine monuments ==
=== Hagia Irene ===
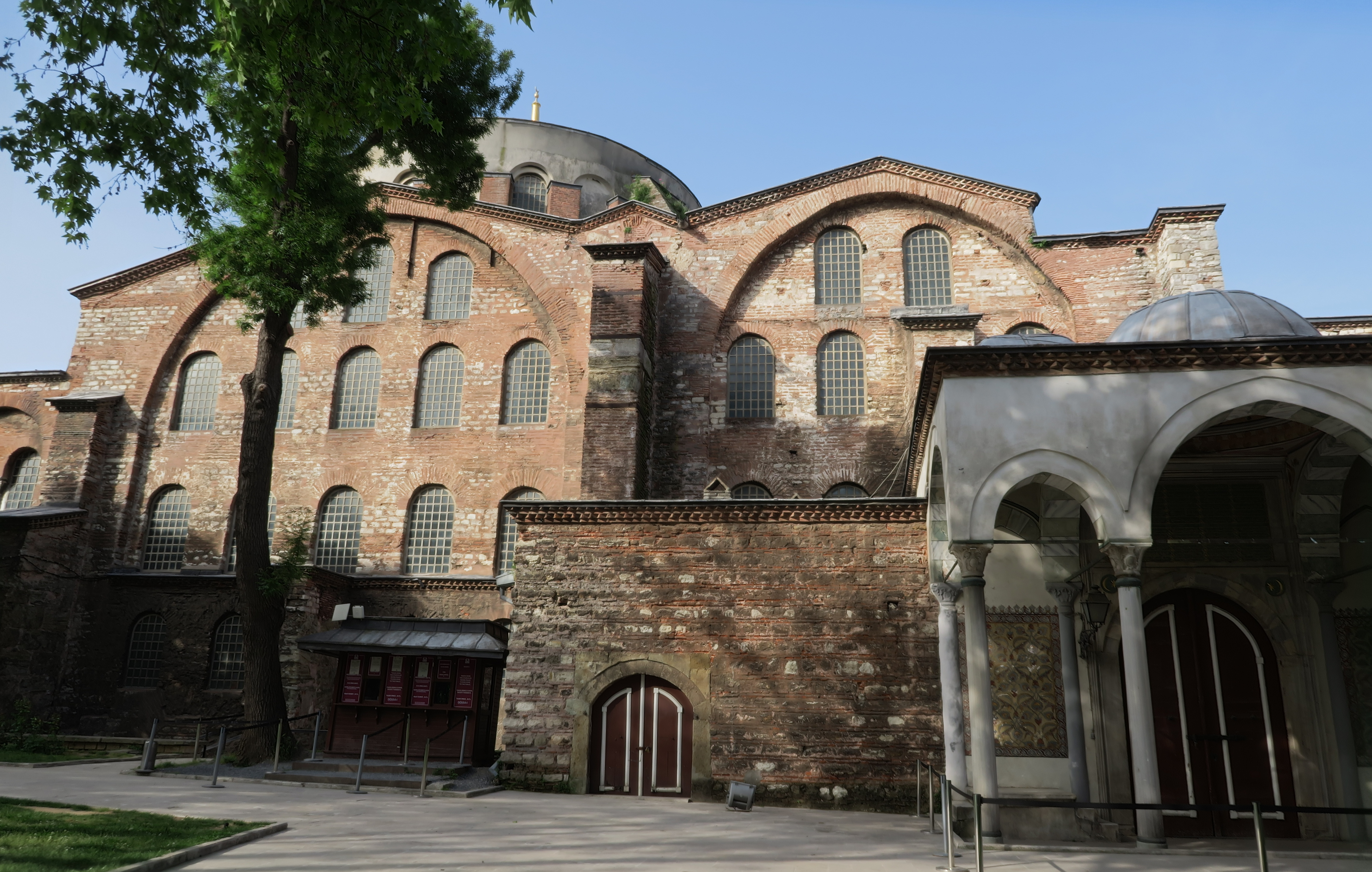
Exterior view of Hagia Irene.

Hagia Irene served as a model church for the Hagia Sophia. Construction on the church began in the 4th century. This was the first church that was built in Constantinople, but due to its location, it was severely damaged by earthquakes and the Nika riots, and required repair several times. The Hagia Irene is defined by its large atrium, and is in fact the only surviving building of the Byzantine Empire to have such a feature.

==== Construction ====
Hagia Irene is composed mainly of three materials: stone, brick, and mortar. Bricks 70 cm x 35 cm x 5 cm were used, and these bricks were glued together using mortar approximately 5 cm thick. The building materials chosen for the construction of the church had to be lightweight, durable, and strong. Volcanic materials were chosen for this purpose, as volcanic concrete is very light and durable. Perhaps the most definite feature of the Hagia Irene is the strict contrast between the interior and exterior design. While the plain outside composed of stone and brick favors functionality, the interior is decorated in elaborate mosaics, decorative marble, and, in some places, covered in plaster. Another important characteristic of the church include two domes that follow one behind another, the first being a lower oval, and the second being a higher semi-circle.

==== History of Hagia Irene ====
Throughout history Hagia Irene has undergone several changes. There were multiple repairs due to the Nika riots and earthquakes. When the Ottomans took over Hagia Irene they repurposed it and made a few changes, but none as drastic as what was done to Hagia Sophia. Today, Hagia Irene is still standing and open to visitors as a museum. It is open everyday, except for Tuesdays.

Construction of Hagia Irene

Timeline
| Time | Event |
|---|---|
| 4th C. | Construction began |
| 532 | Church was burned during Nika riots |
| 548 | Emperor Justinian repaired the church |
| 740 | Significant damages from earthquakes |
| 1453 | Constantinople was conquered by the Ottomans - became a weapons storehouse |
| 1700 | Became a museum |
| 1908-1978 | Served as a military museum. |

=== Hagia Sophia ===
The most famous example of Byzantine architecture is the Hagia Sophia, and it has been described as "holding a unique position in the Christian world", and as an architectural and cultural icon of Byzantine and Eastern Orthodox civilization. The Hagia Sophia held the title of largest church in the world until the Ottoman Empire sieged the Byzantine capital. After the fall of Constantinople, the church was used by the Muslims for their religious services until 1931, when it was reopened as a museum in 1935, before being converted back into a mosque in 2020. Translated from Greek, the name Hagia Sophia means "Holy Wisdom".

==== Construction of Hagia Sophia ====
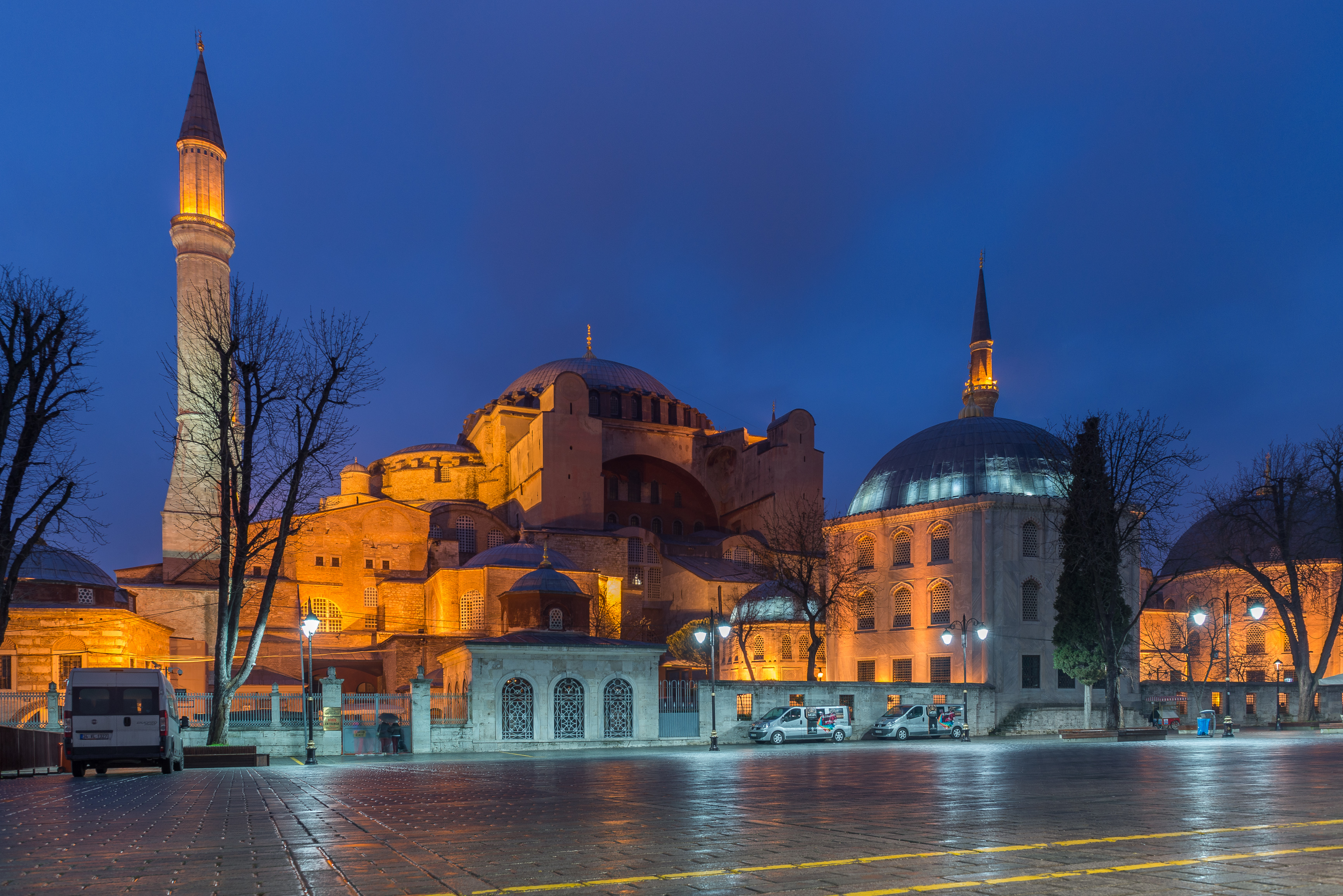
Exterior view of Hagia Sophia

The construction is a combination of longitudinal and central structures. This church was a part of a larger complex of buildings created by Emperor Justinian. This style influenced the construction of several other buildings, such as St. Peter's Basilica. Hagia Sophia should have been built to withstand earthquakes, but since the construction of Hagia Sophia was rushed this technology was not implemented in the design, which is why the building has had to be repaired so many times due to damages from the earthquakes. The dome is the key feature of Hagia Sophia as the domed basilica is representative of Byzantine architecture. Both of the domes collapsed at different times throughout history due to earthquakes and had to be rebuilt.

==== History of Hagia Sophia ====
The original construction of Hagia Sophia was possibly ordered by Constantine, but ultimately carried out by his son Constantius II in 360. Constantine's building of churches, specifically the Hagia Sophia, was considered an incredibly significant component in his shift of the centralization of power from Rome in the west to Constantinople in the east, and was considered the high-point of religious and political celebration. The construction of the final version of the Hagia Sophia, which still stands today, was overseen by Emperor Justinian. Between the rule of these two Emperors, Hagia Sophia was destroyed and rebuilt twice. Following its reconstruction, Hagia Sophia was considered the center of Orthodox Christianity for 900 years, until the fall of Constantinople to the Ottomans.

Timeline
| Time | Event |
|---|---|
| 360 | Construction began |
| 404 | Hagia Sophia was burned down in public riot. |
| 415 | Construction begins on the next version of Hagia Sophia. |
| 532 | The church is once again demolished during Nika riots. |
| 537 | The final version of Hagia Sophia opens to Christian worship after five more years of construction. |
| 558 | Earthquake - dome collapsed |
| 859 | Fire damage |
| 869 | Earthquake damage |
| 989 | More earthquake damage |
| 1317 | Large buttresses added |
| 1453 | Constantinople fell to the Ottomans - converted into a mosque |
| 1935 | Hagia Sophia is converted into a museum by secularists |
| 2020 | Reverted to a mosque |

== Gallery ==
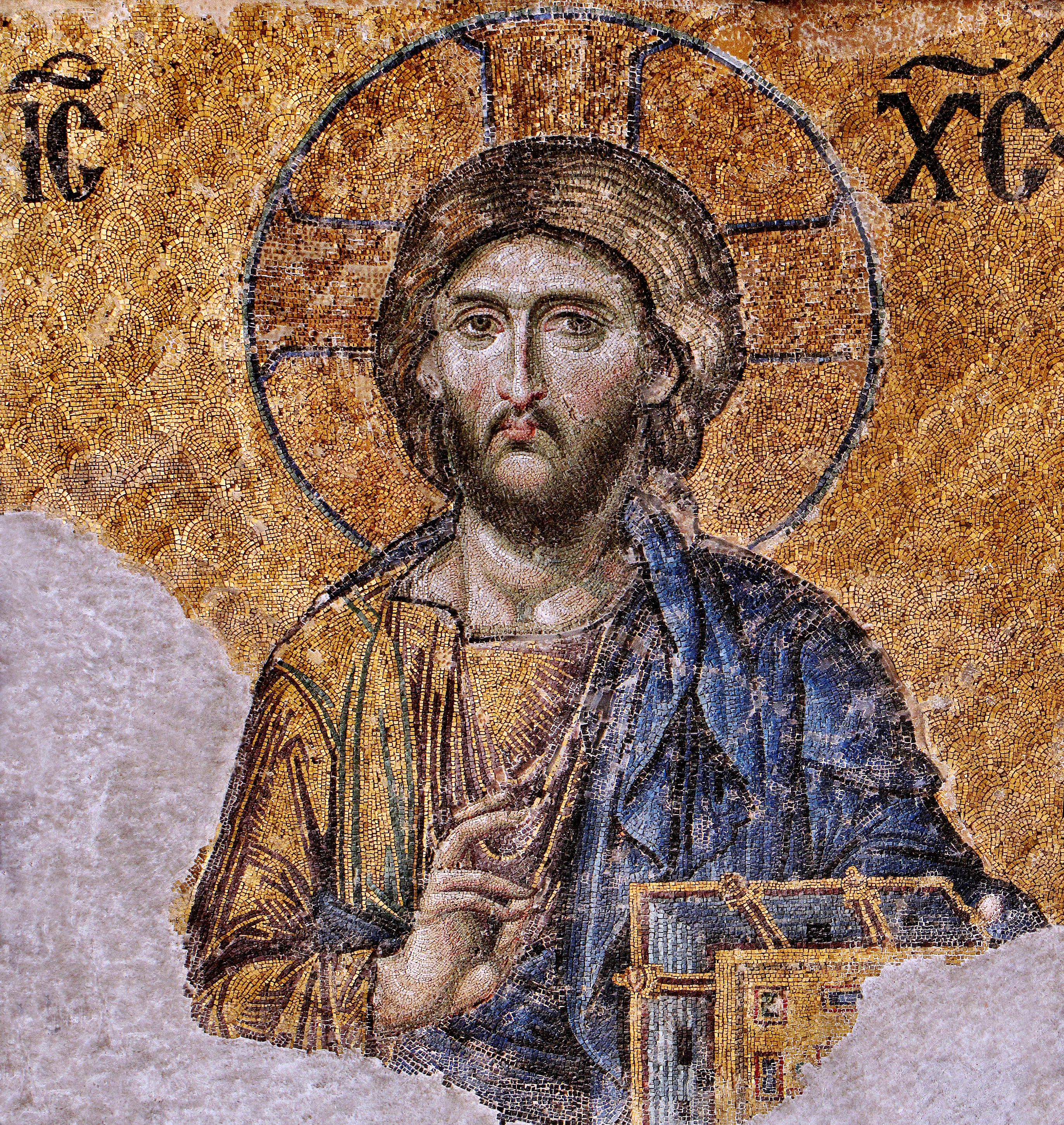
A Byzantine mosaic in Hagia Sophia in Istanbul, Turkey

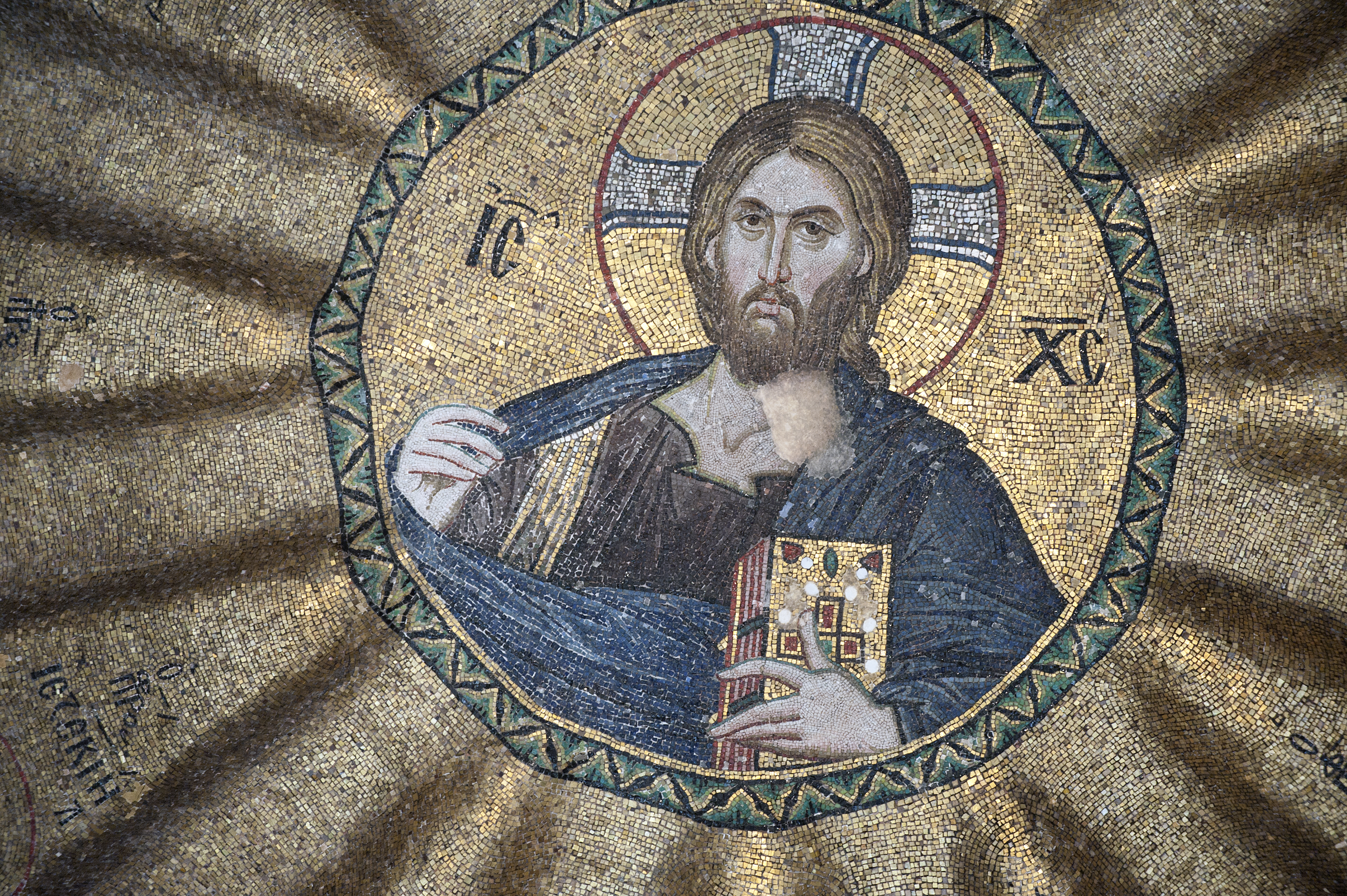
Mosaic of Jesus in Pammakaristos Church in Istanbul

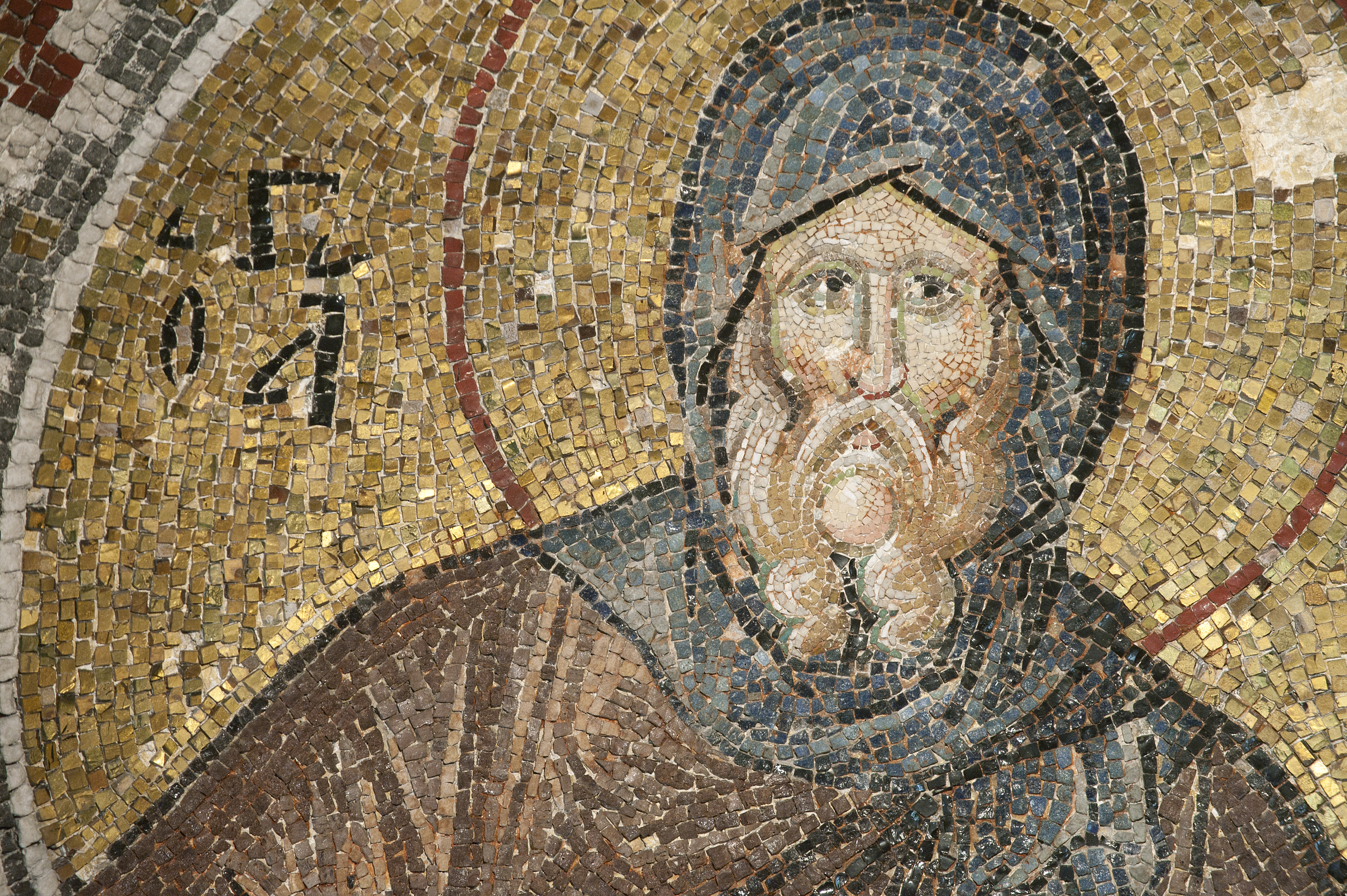
Mosaic of Saint Antony, the desert Father in Pammakaristos Church in Istanbul

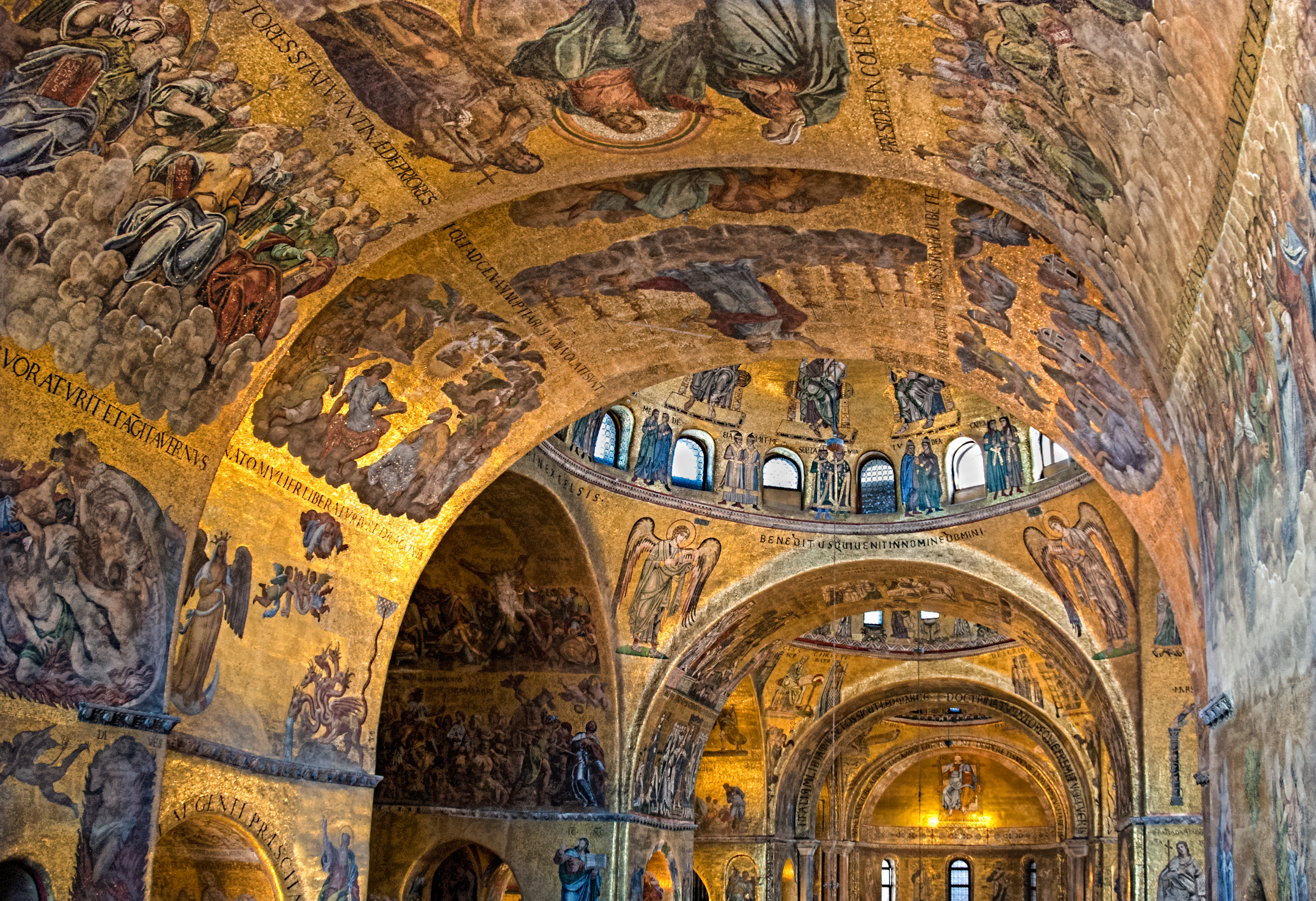
Byzantine mosaics in St Mark's Basilica, Venice

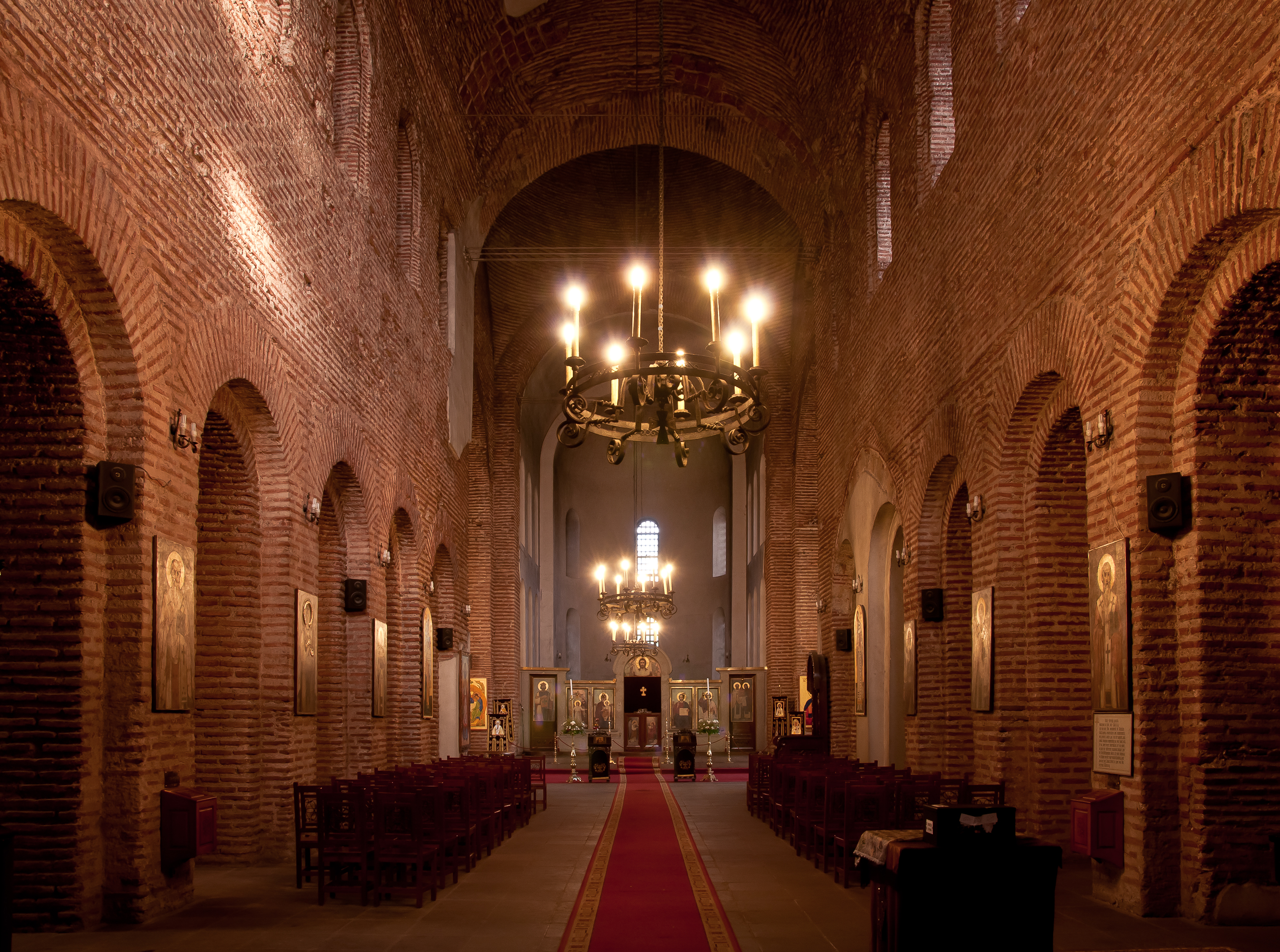
Interior of Saint Sofia Church, Sofia, (6th century)

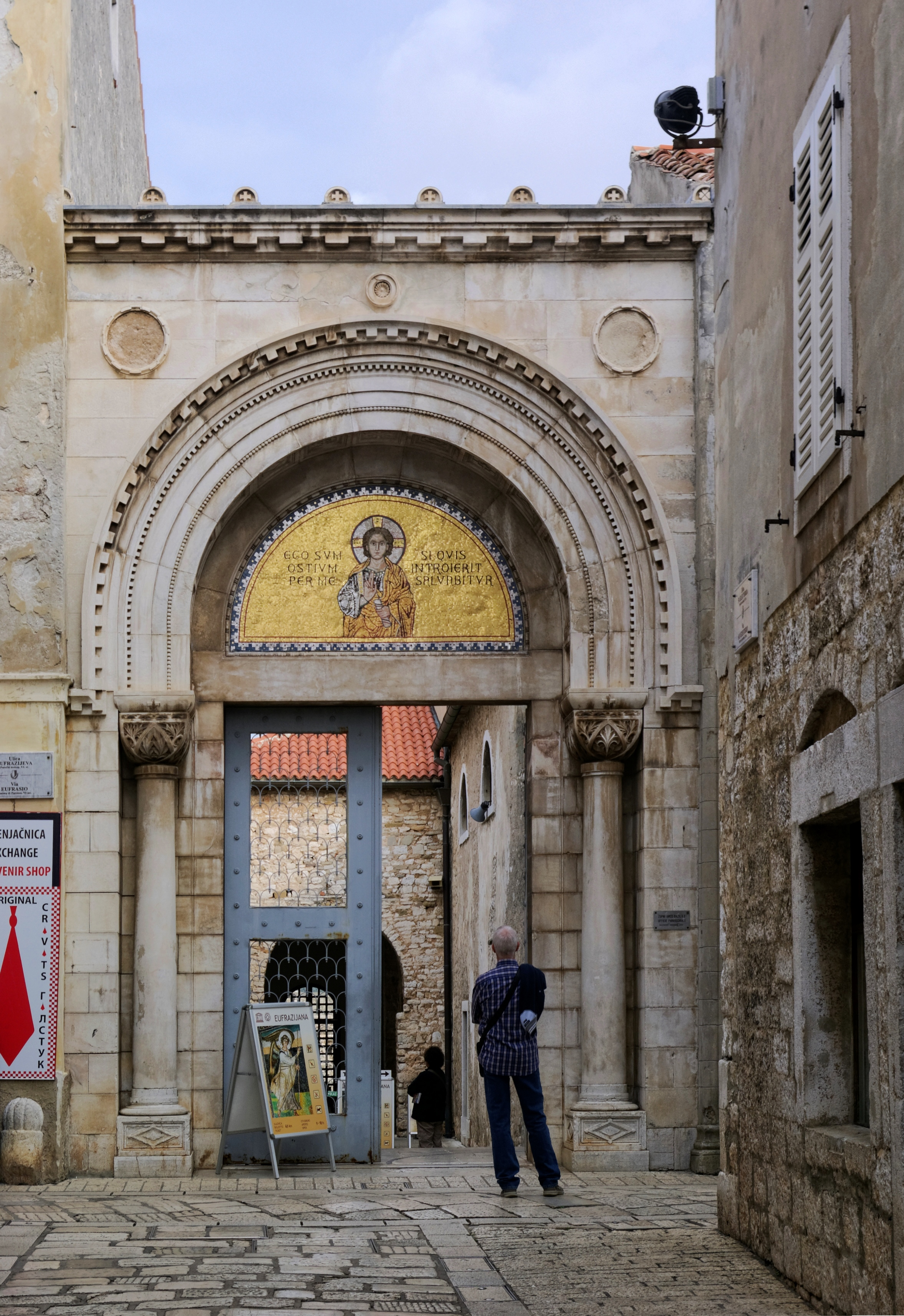
Mosaic above the entrance portal of the Euphrasian Basilica in Poreč (6th century)

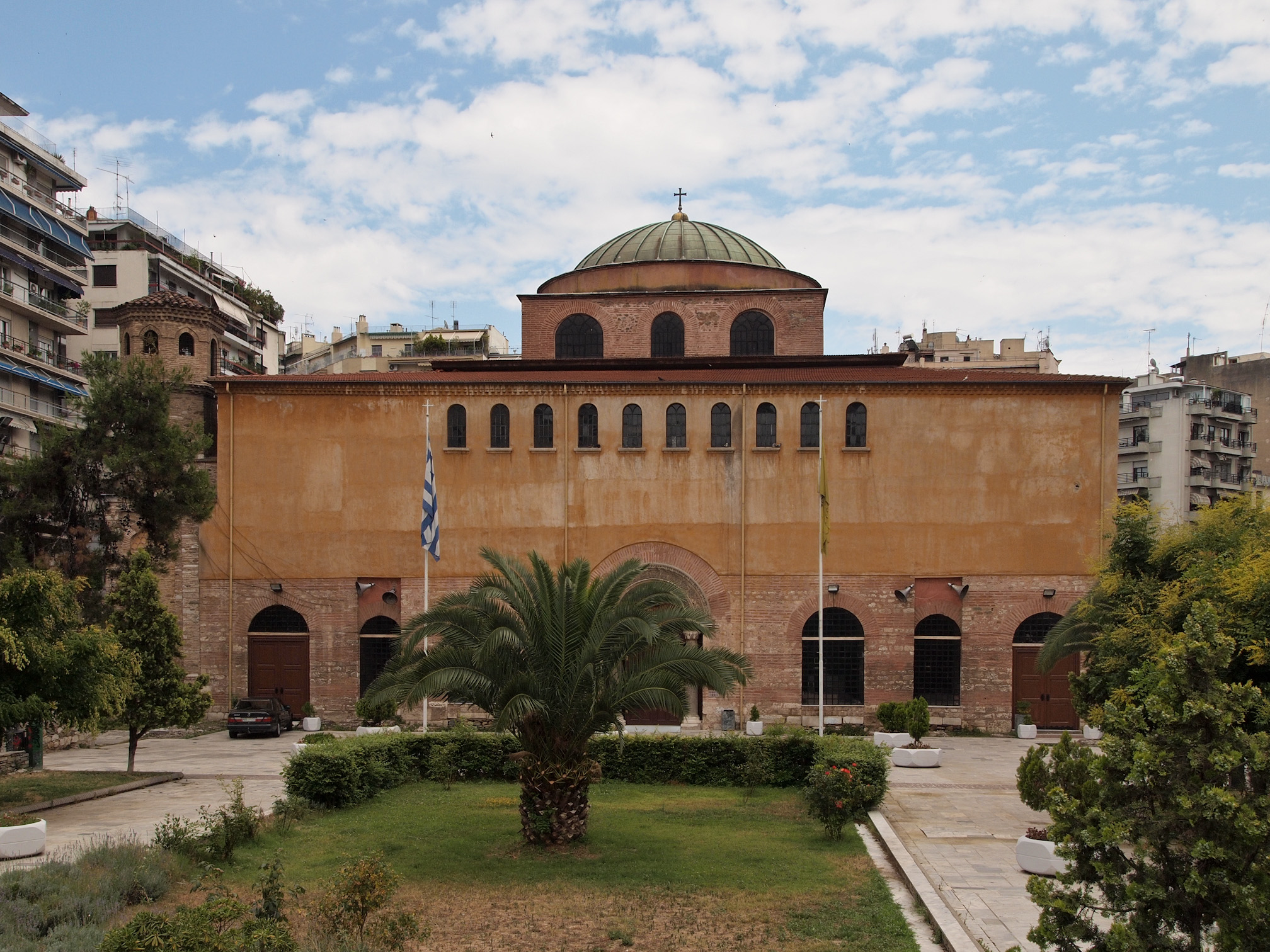
Hagia Sophia, Thessaloniki (8th century)

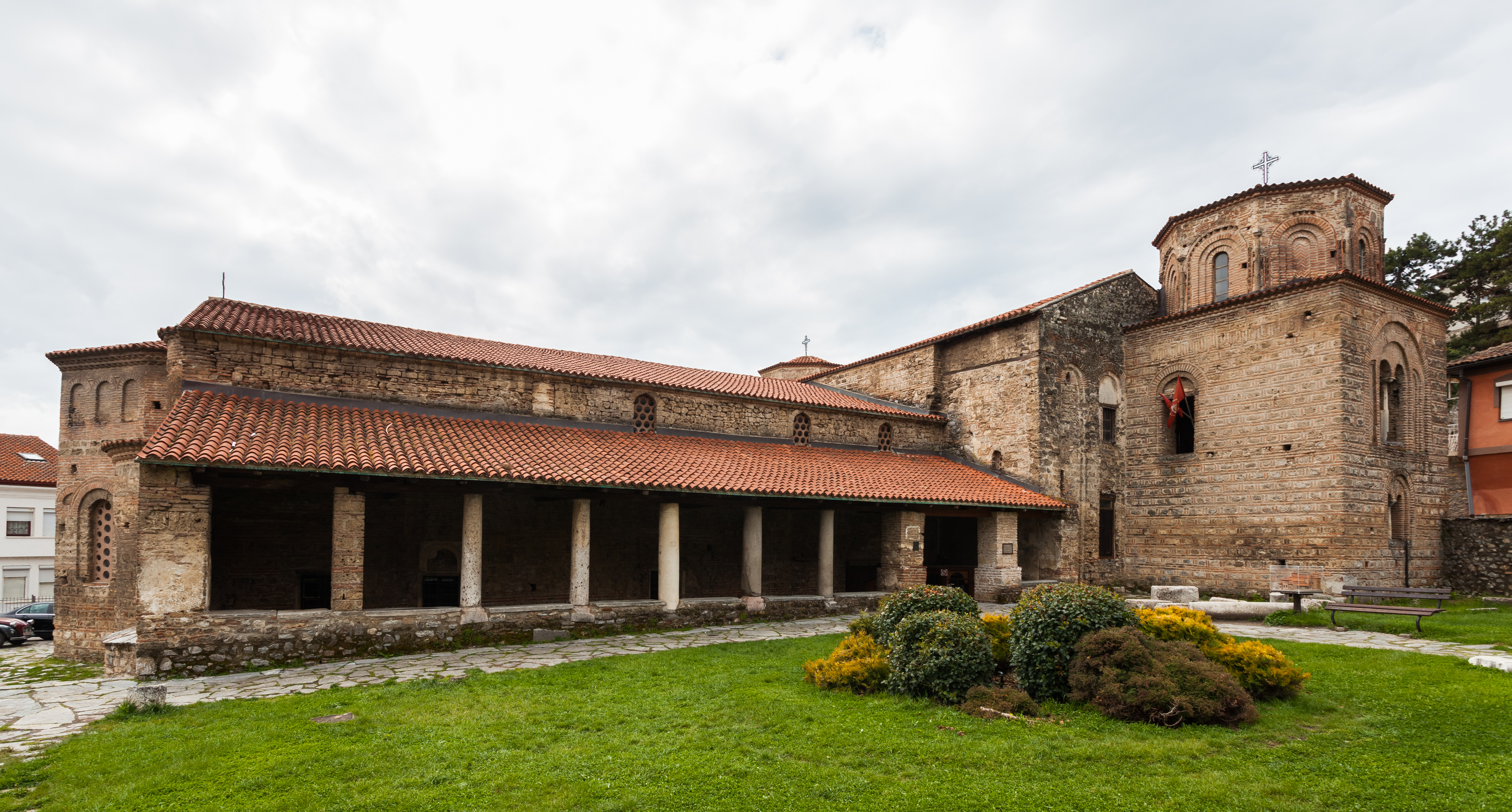
Narthex of St. Sophia, build in Ohrid in the First Bulgarian Empire (9th century), now in North Macedonia

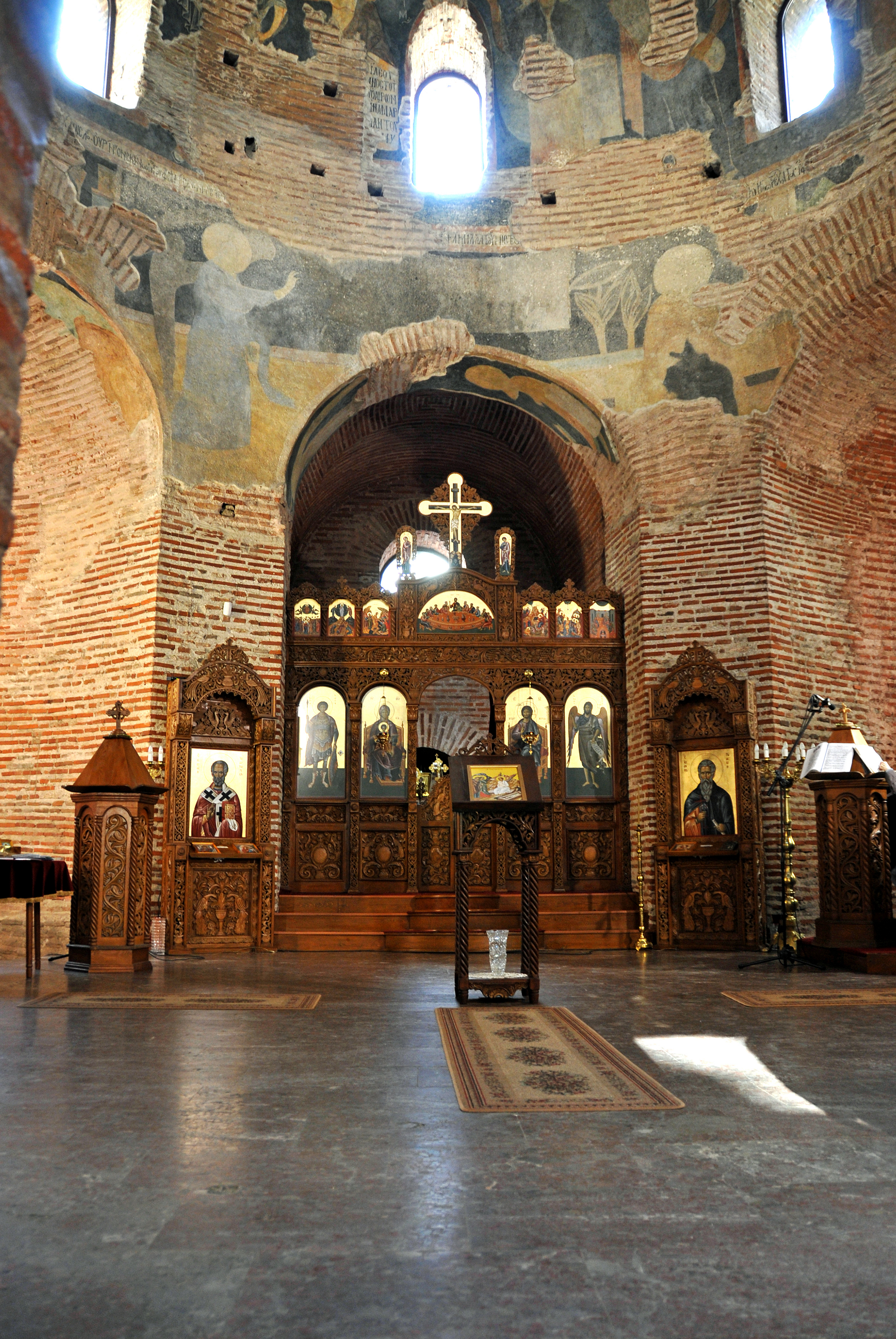
Interior of Church of St. George, Sofia, 4th century

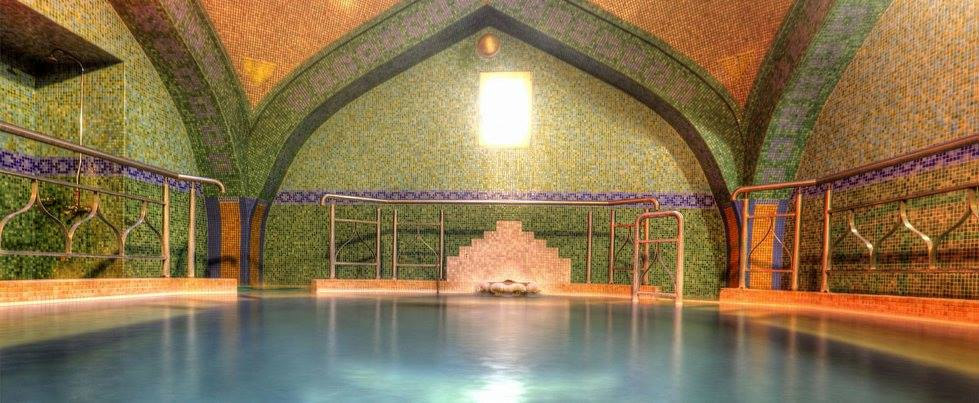
Agkistro Byzantine bath

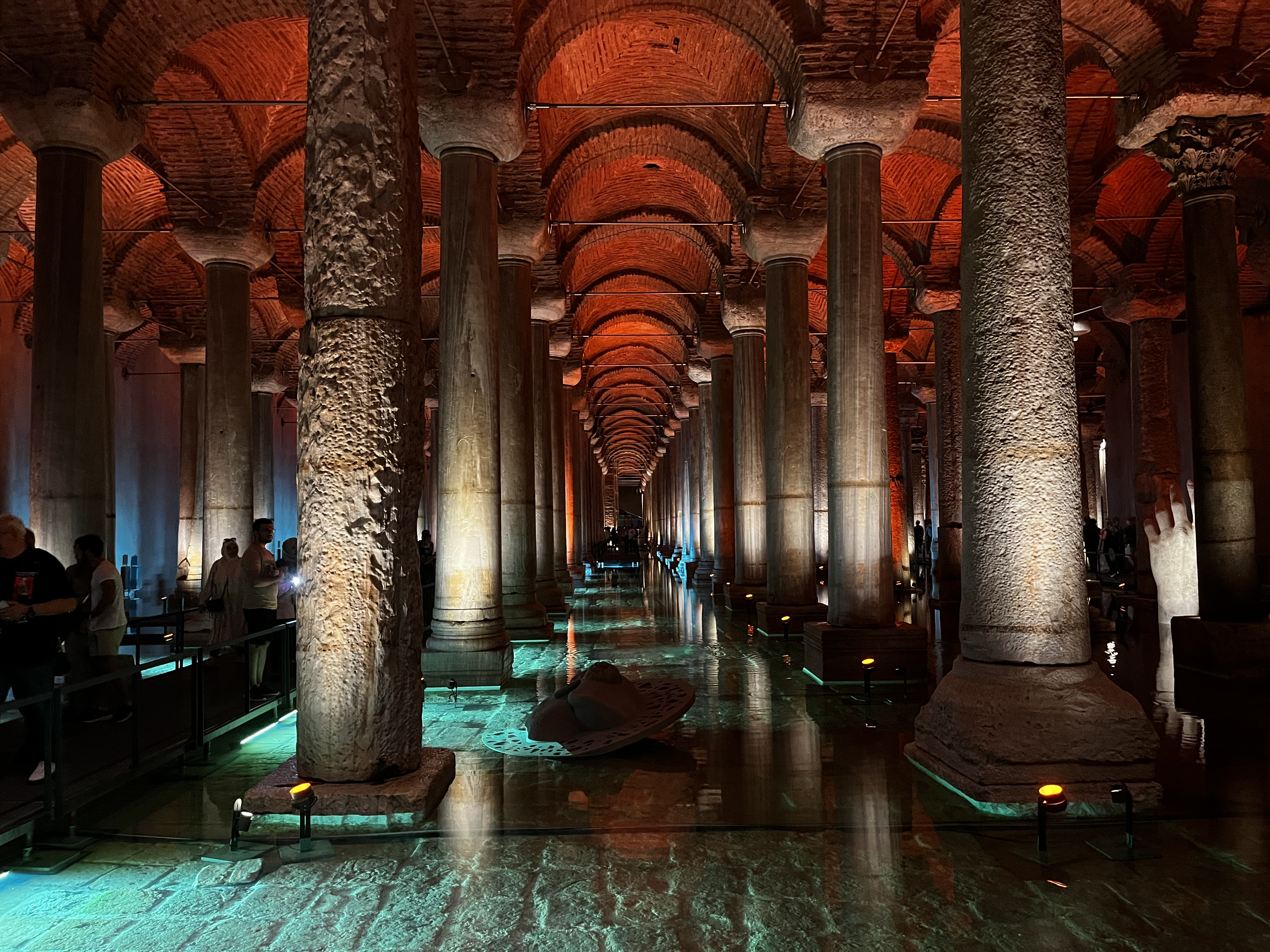
Basilica Cistern

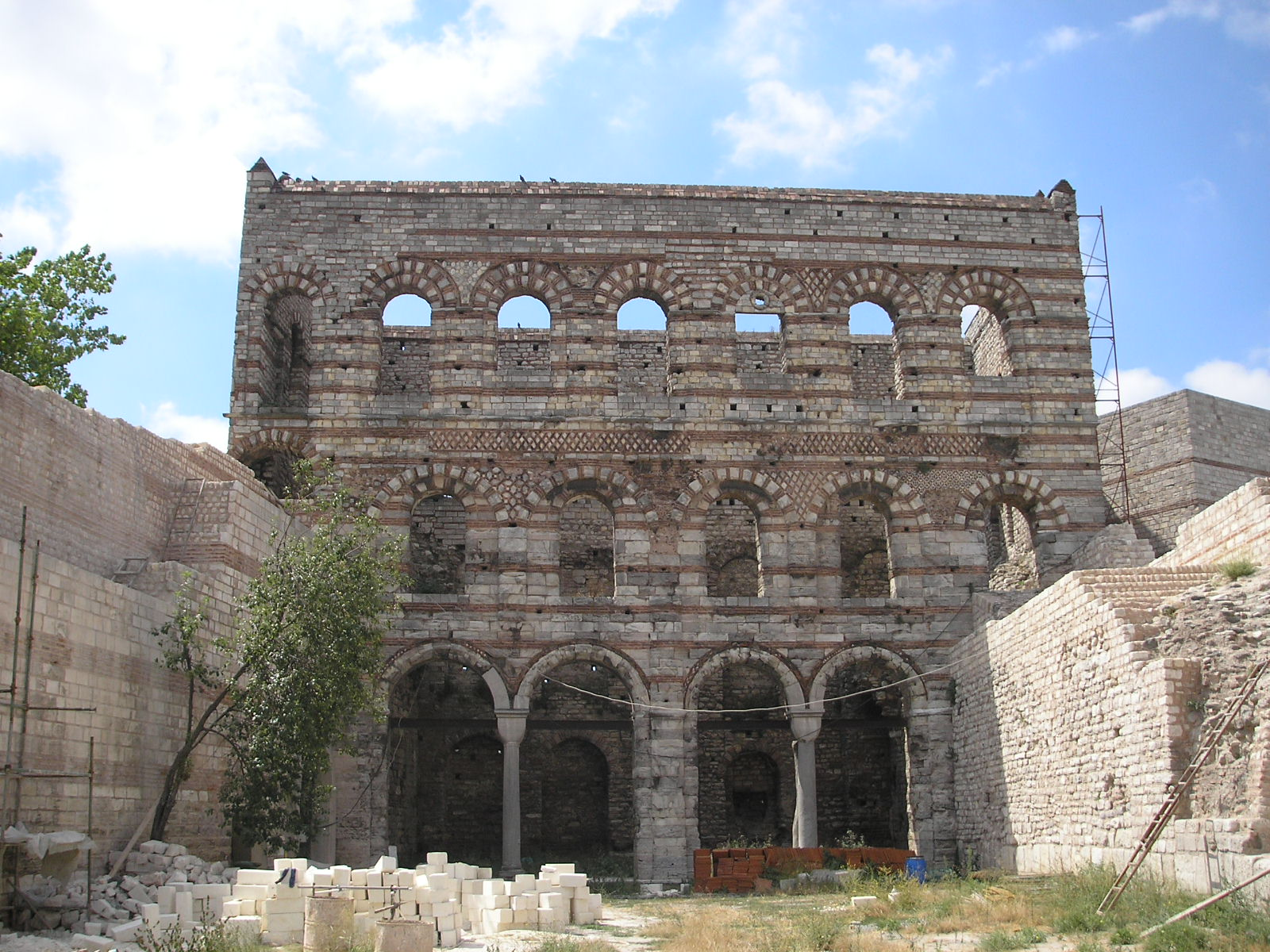
Palace of the Porphyrogenitus

== See also ==
- Architectural style
- Architecture of the Tarnovo Artistic School
- Architecture of Kievan Rus'
- Byzantine art
- Kaisariani Monastery
- Golden Age of medieval Bulgarian culture
- Ancient Roman and Byzantine domes
- Medieval architecture
- Neo-Byzantine architecture
- Ottoman architecture
- Russian-Byzantine architecture
- Sasanian architecture
- Armenian architecture
