= Architecture of Veliko Tarnovo =

Veliko Tarnovo is a town with a historical architectural heritage. Many of the landmark buildings and bridges were destroyed by the 1913 earthquake. The town has developed architecture from four historic periods.

Vector line art illustration of Veliko Tarnovo

== The Middle Ages ==
Fortress construction on the site of the monastery of the Great Lavra (Holy Forty Martyrs Church) existed during the First Bulgarian Empire. It experienced the greatest development during the Second Bulgarian State, when the city was the capital. The churches of the Second Bulgarian State are relatively small cross-domed temples or basilicas. The fortress walls that protected the main cores of Turnovo were made up of creations. Between them were alternates and merlons. These elements were also called "warriors" and served as a defense in an attack. There were internal firewalls. Another remedy was the so-called. counterforces. According to sources, the height of the walls of Tsarevets Hill ranged from 3.5 to 4.5 meters. It is assumed that the walls of Trapezitsa and Momina Krepost, as well as the five walls that surrounded the New Town, were raised at such height. The palace is built on three levels, including the Throne Building, the Royal Rooms, other residential and administrative halls, cellars, water reservoir. It is decorated with mosaics, marble finishes and murals. [2] Many of the boyars' homes had courtyards centered on chapels or churches. The Shishman bath is one of the few authentic works of Tarnovo architecture. Today, the fortresses of Tsarevets and Trapezitsa, the Church of Saints Peter and Paul, Veliko Tarnovo, the Church of Saint Demetrius of Thessaloniki, the Holy Forty Martyrs Church, and the Shishman's Bath are partially or completely rebuilt

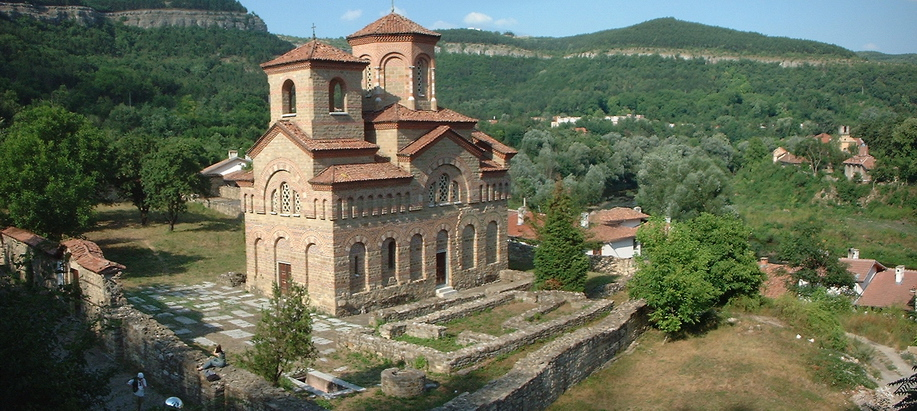
Church of Saint Demetrius of Thessaloniki

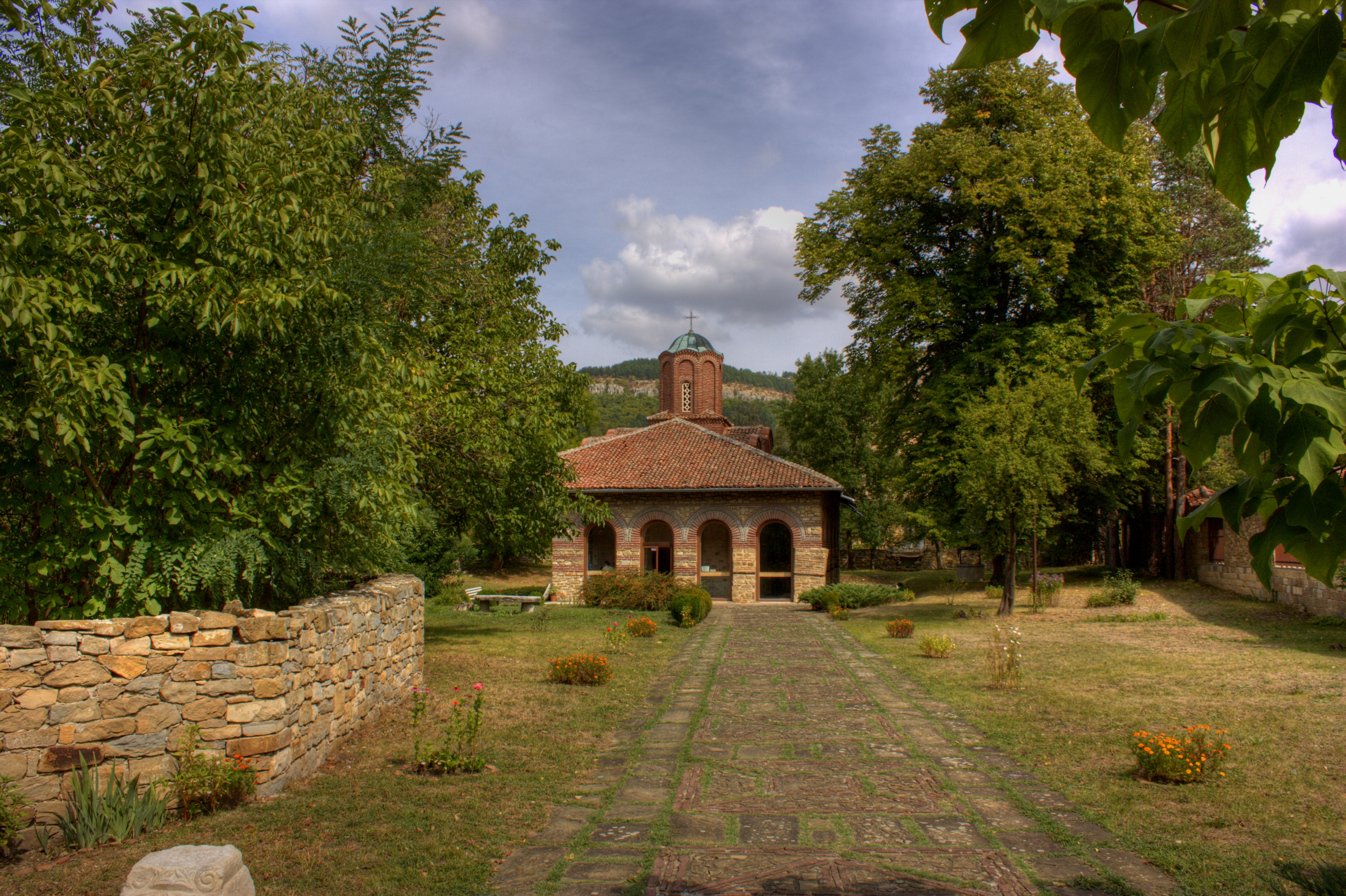
Church of Saints Peter and Paul

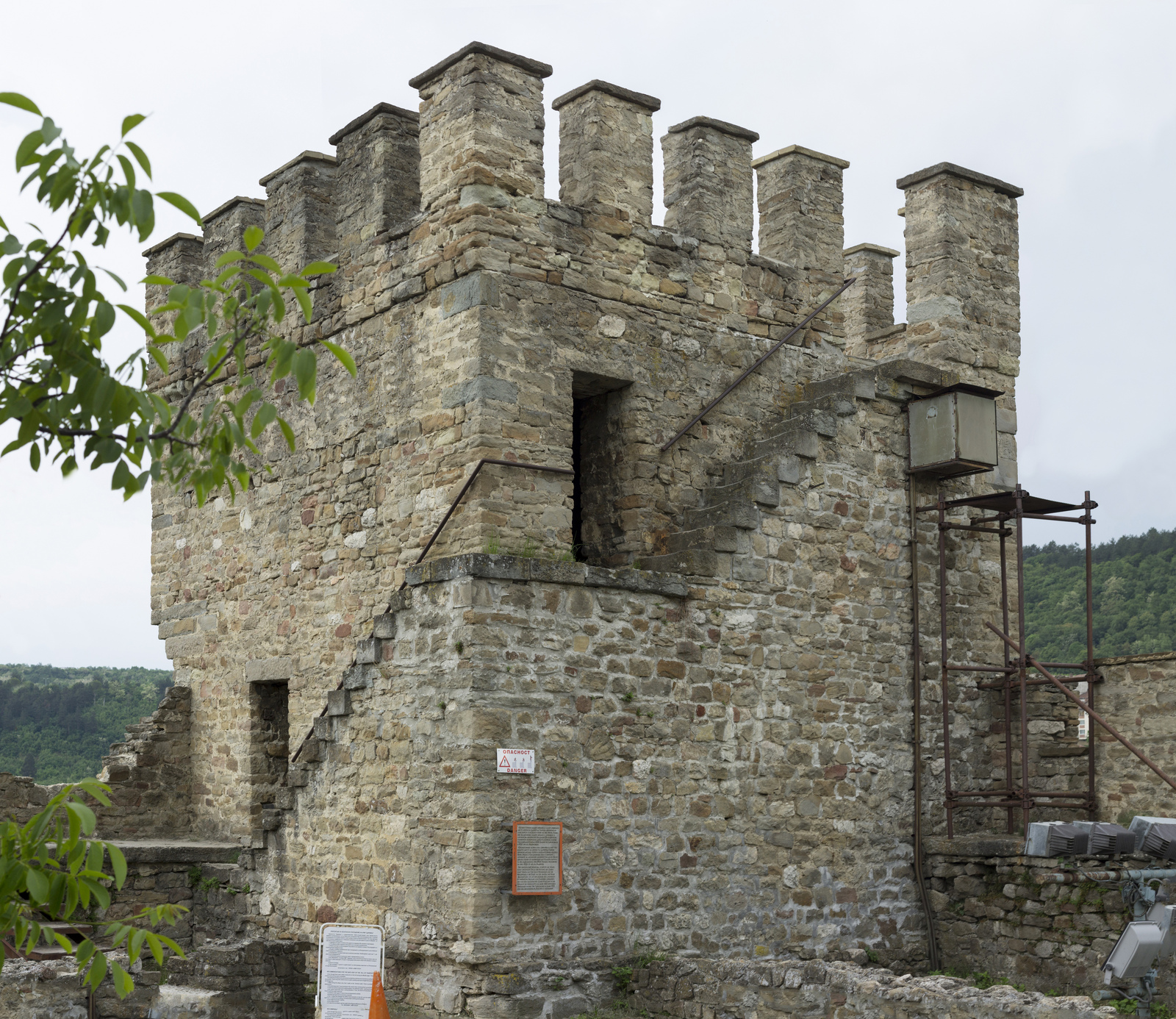

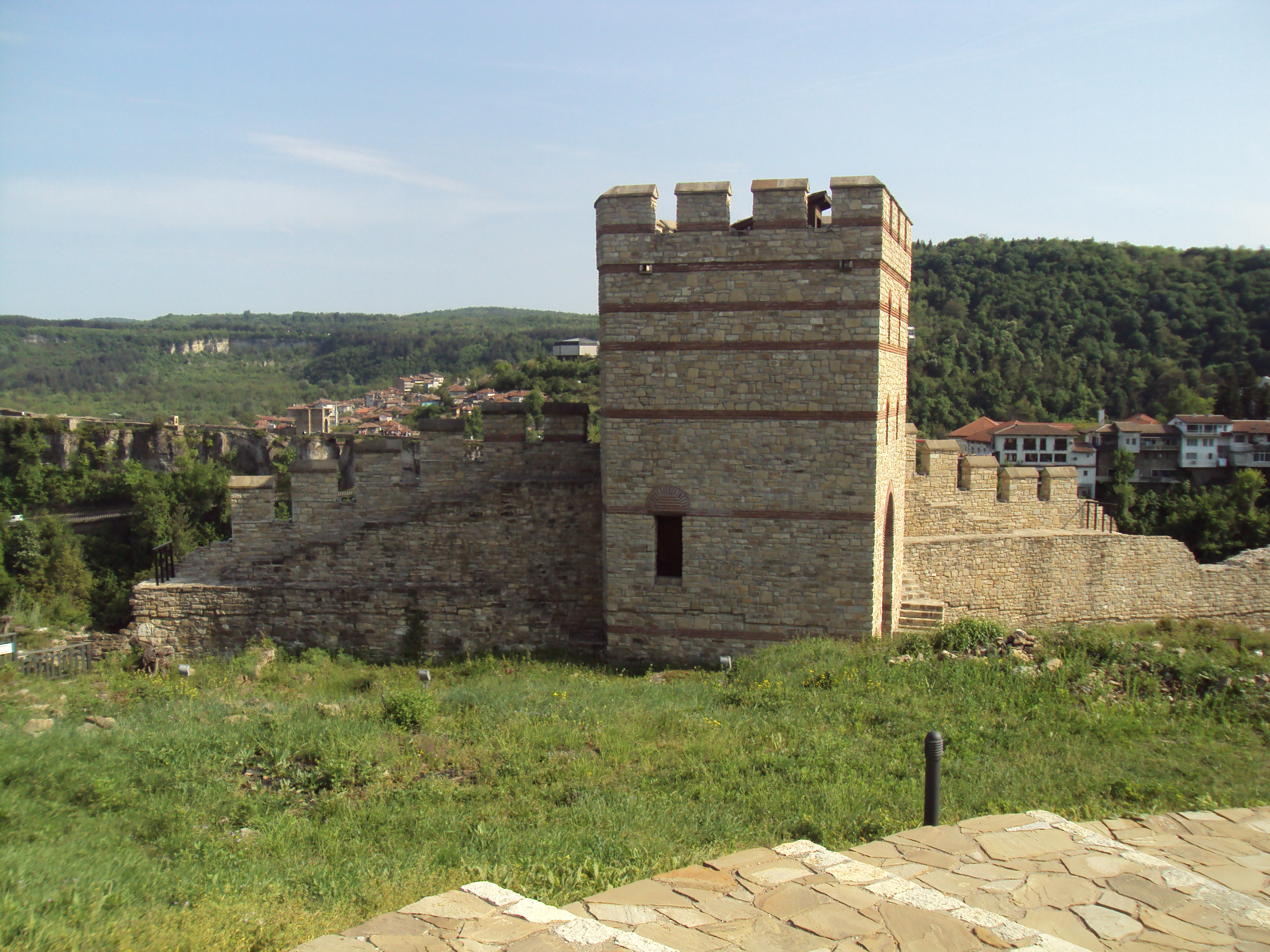

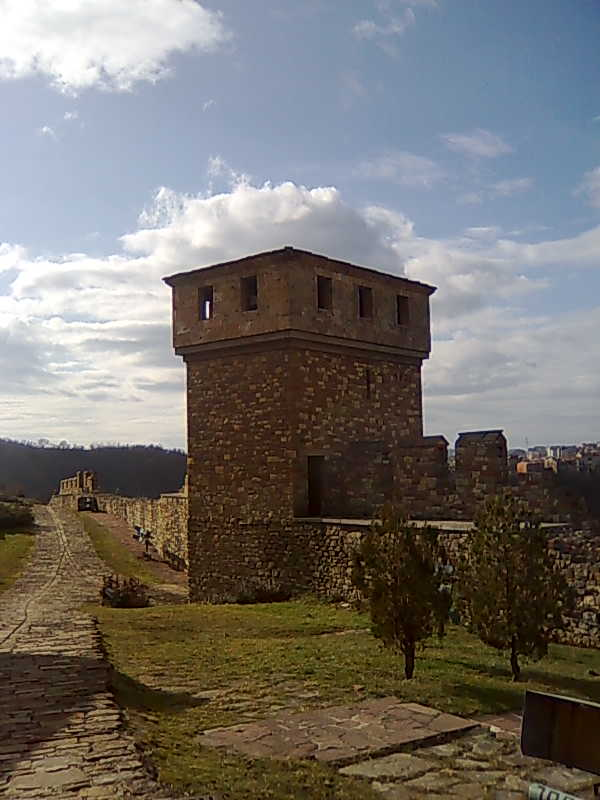

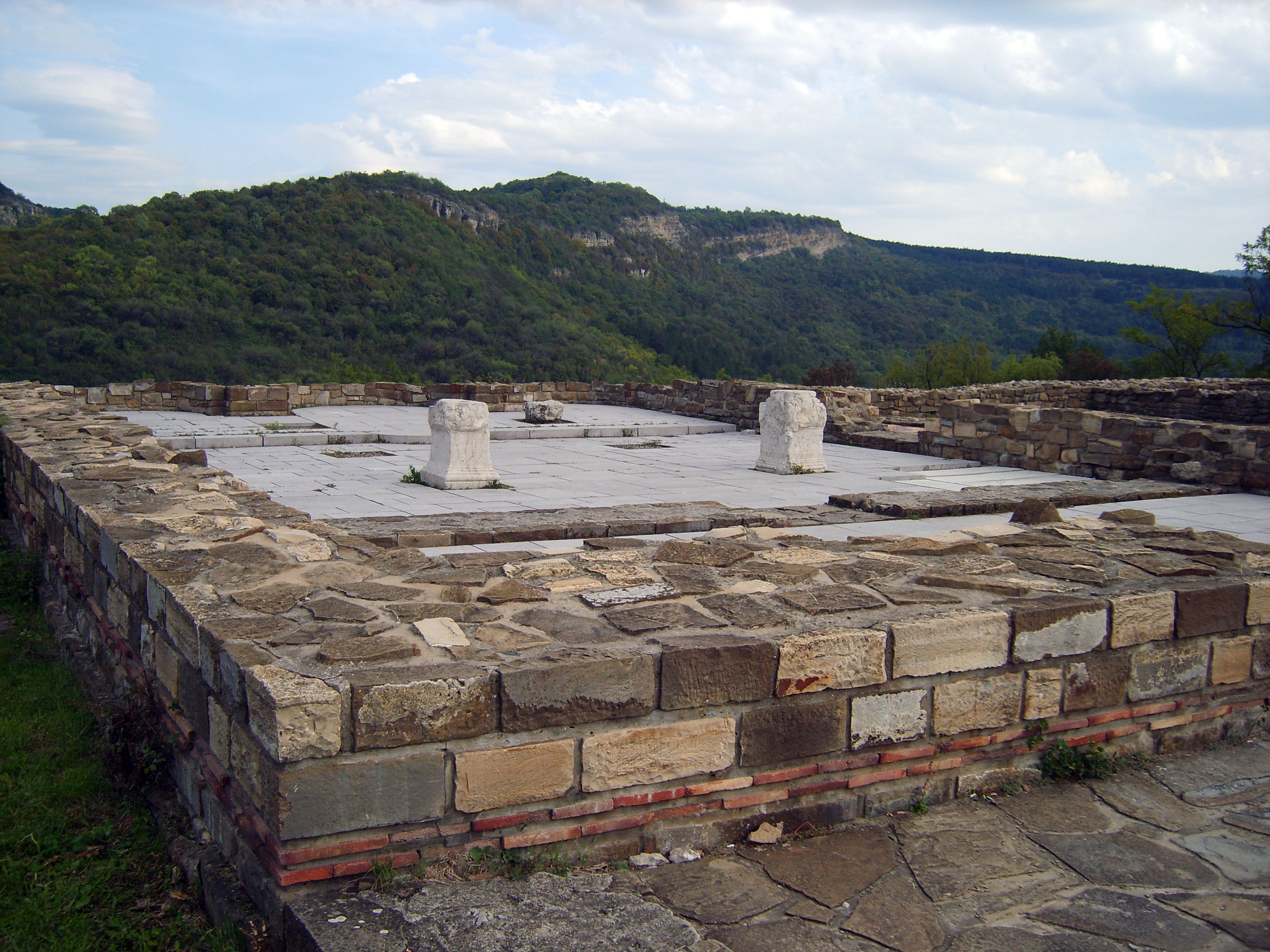

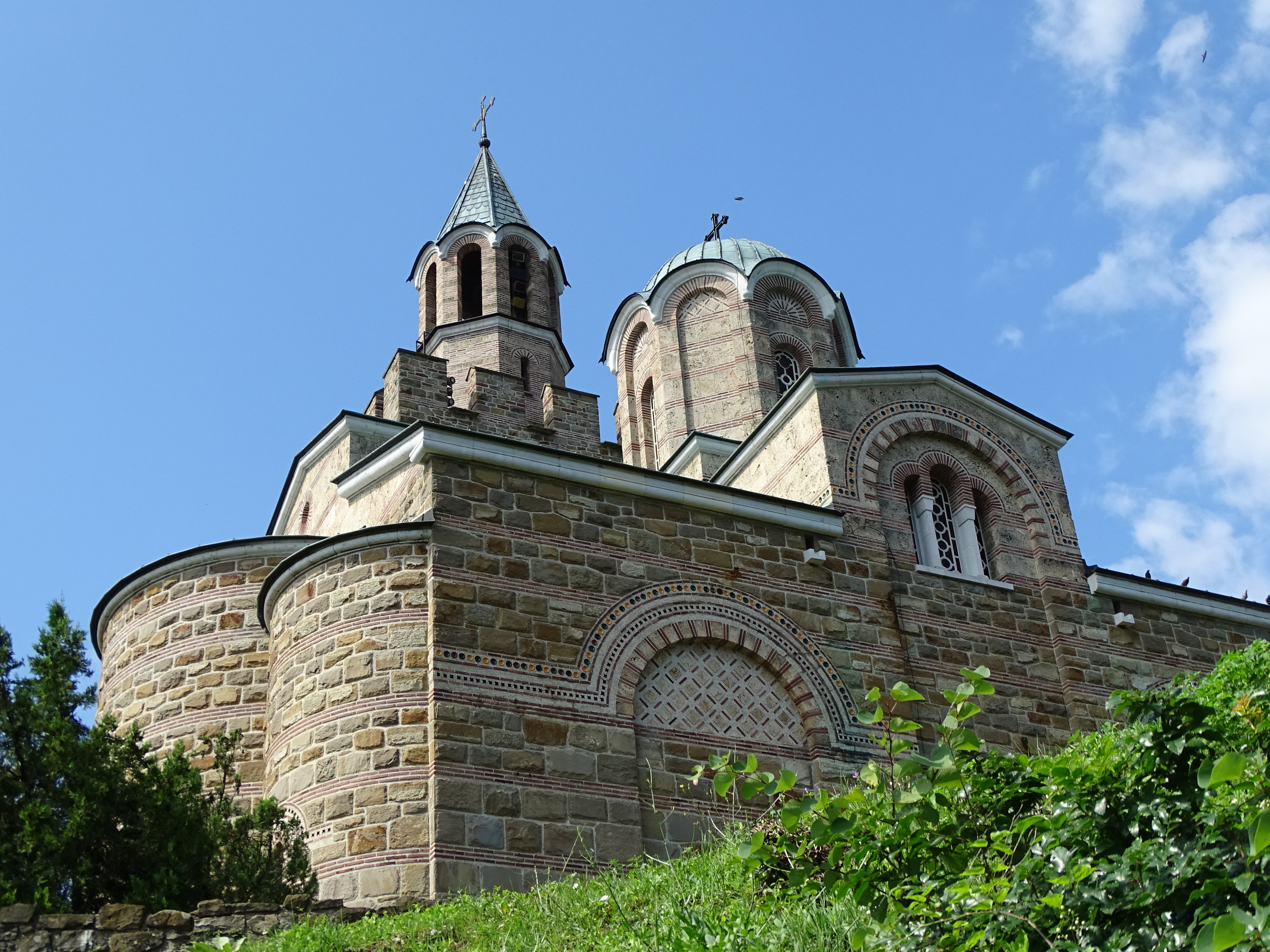

== Renaissance ==
The most significant trace in architecture during the Renaissance remains the Bulgarian genius from Dryanovo - Kolyu Ficheto. He has built several significant churches in the city:Orthodox Church Of Saint Marina, Church of St Constantine and Helena, Church Of Saint Nikolas., Church Of Saint Spas and Church Of Saints Cyril and Methodius.

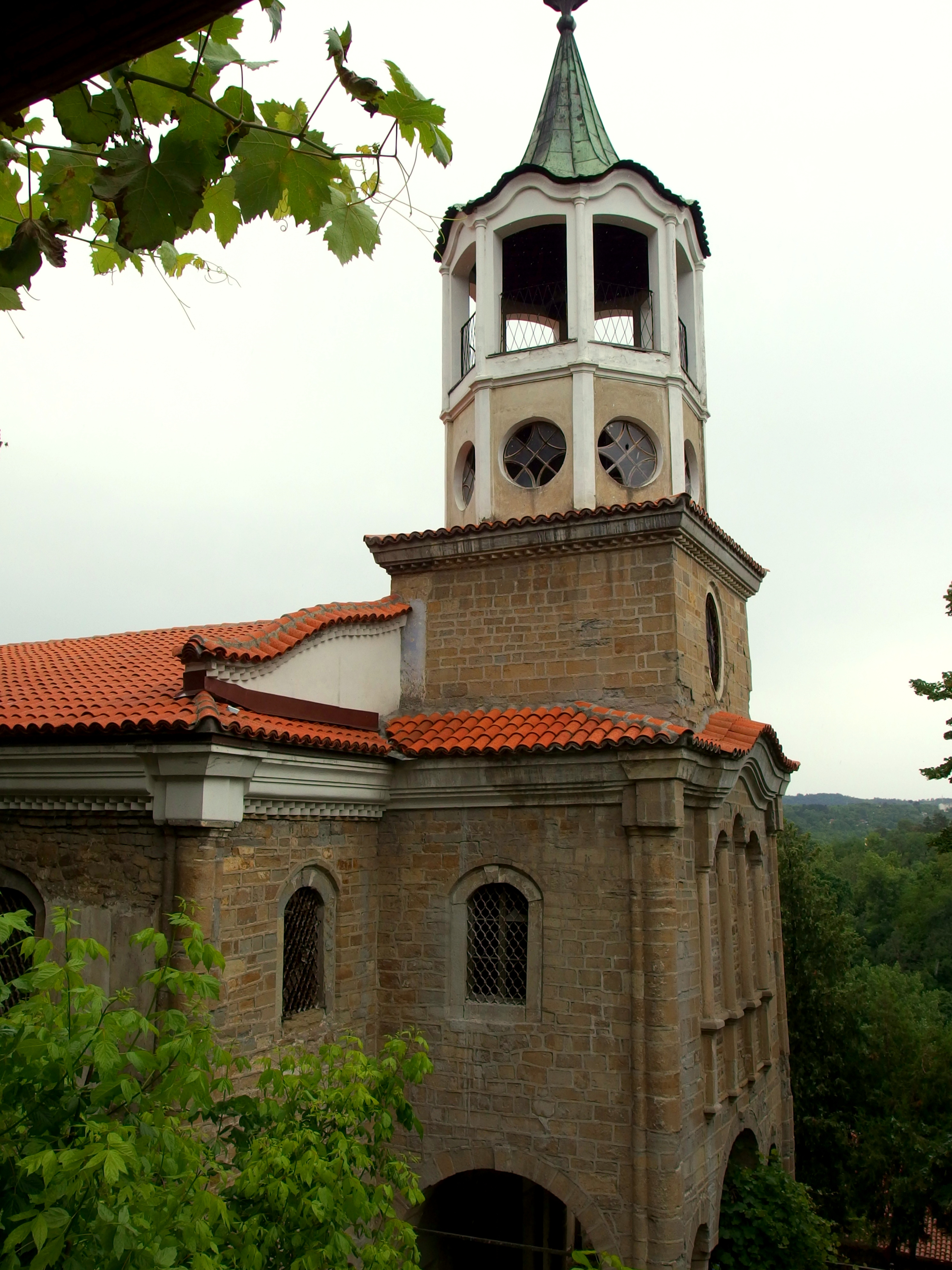
Church of Saints Constantine and Helena

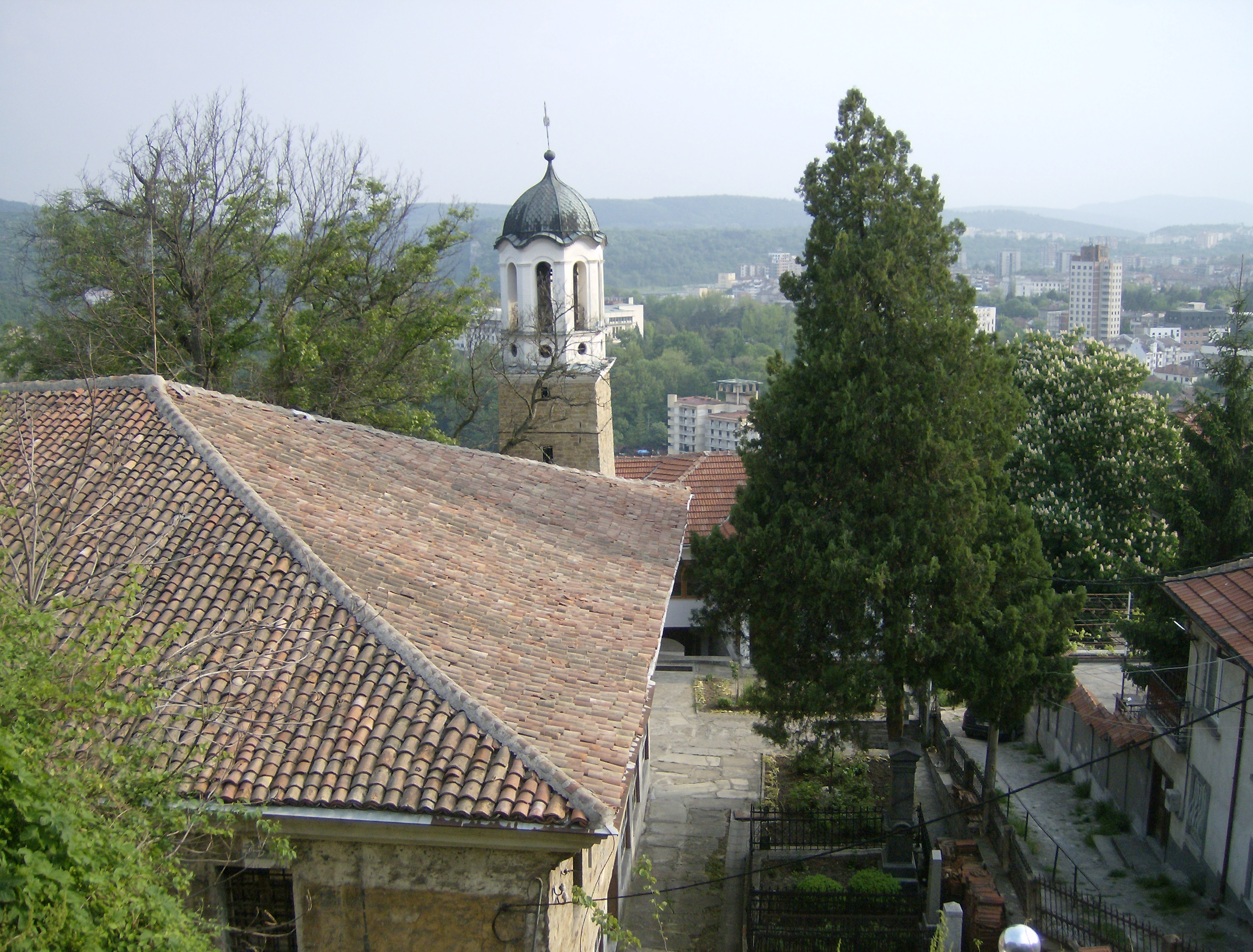
Saint Nicholas

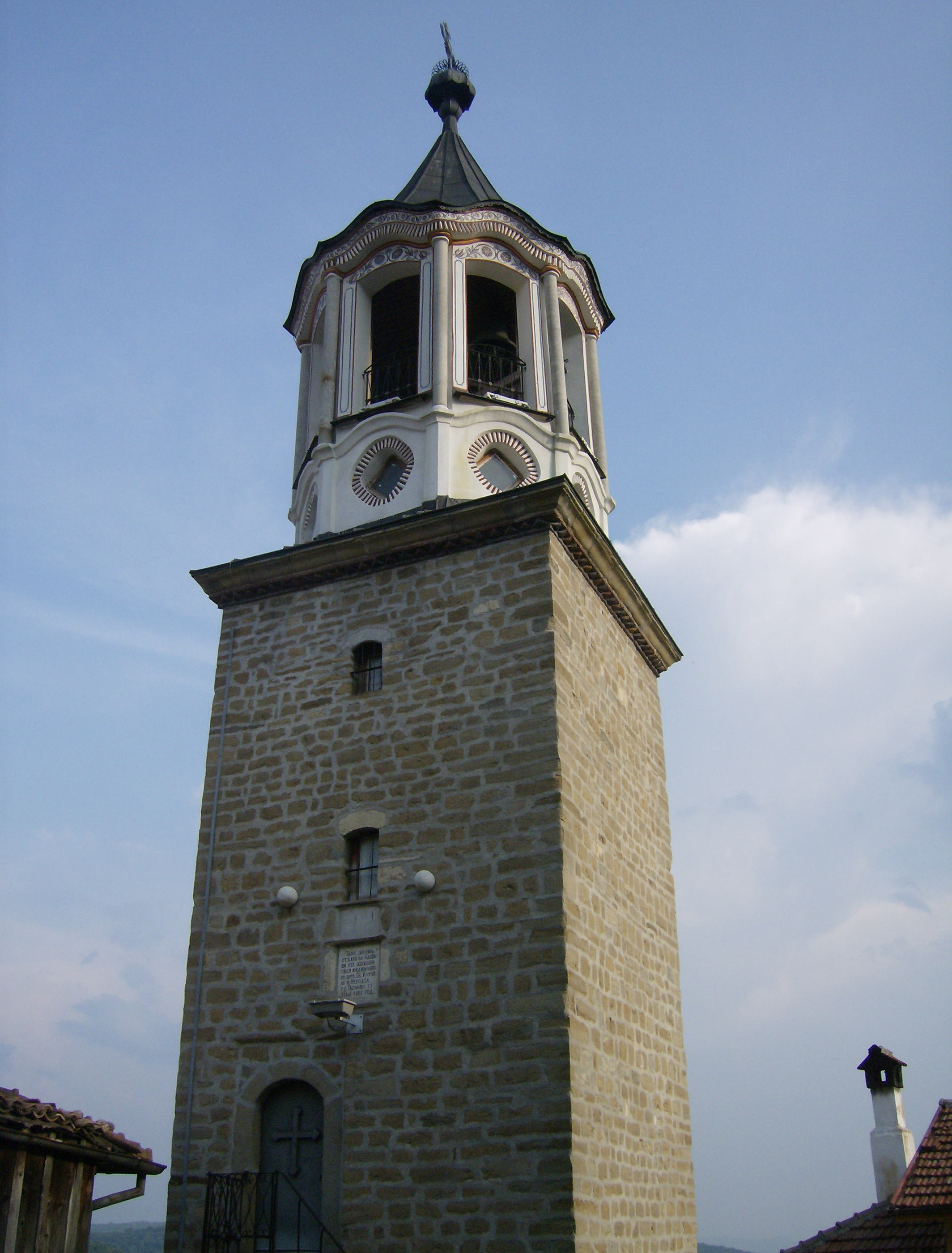
Church Of Saints Cyril and Methodius

=== Early Revival Houses (1750-1828) ===
Characteristic of the early Renaissance houses is a stone ground floor and a stone or tiled floor and they have arched stone entrances, large wooden porches.

=== Houses of the Renaissance period ===
Characteristic of the houses is the hatches issued. The second floor can be lined with wood or bricks. Boris Denev's house has a colored facade (one of the few other houses in this style). The facade of the house is in one color and the facade is ornately painted. In this house, and in the house above St. Constantine and Helena Church, on the terrace and railings for preserved carving elements. Other iconic buildings: Sarafka House (built in 1861; five-storey wooden parapet of eight wooden columns with curved iron sticks enclosing the elongated eighth space of the lobby), Monkey House (built in 1849), Cocoon Anastasia House, Consular Houses and more. They notice a new composition center - a lobby or lounge (glazed porch), a ground floor - a reception with an internal staircase and a covered yard for business. Support beams, facades and vestibule can be decorated with applications. Revival houses that have been partially or completely rebuilt to date are: The house of cocoon Anastasia The house with the monkey (rebuilt 1976), the house of Boris Denev, the house of the architect, the consular houses The Bey's House Sarafkina House and others.

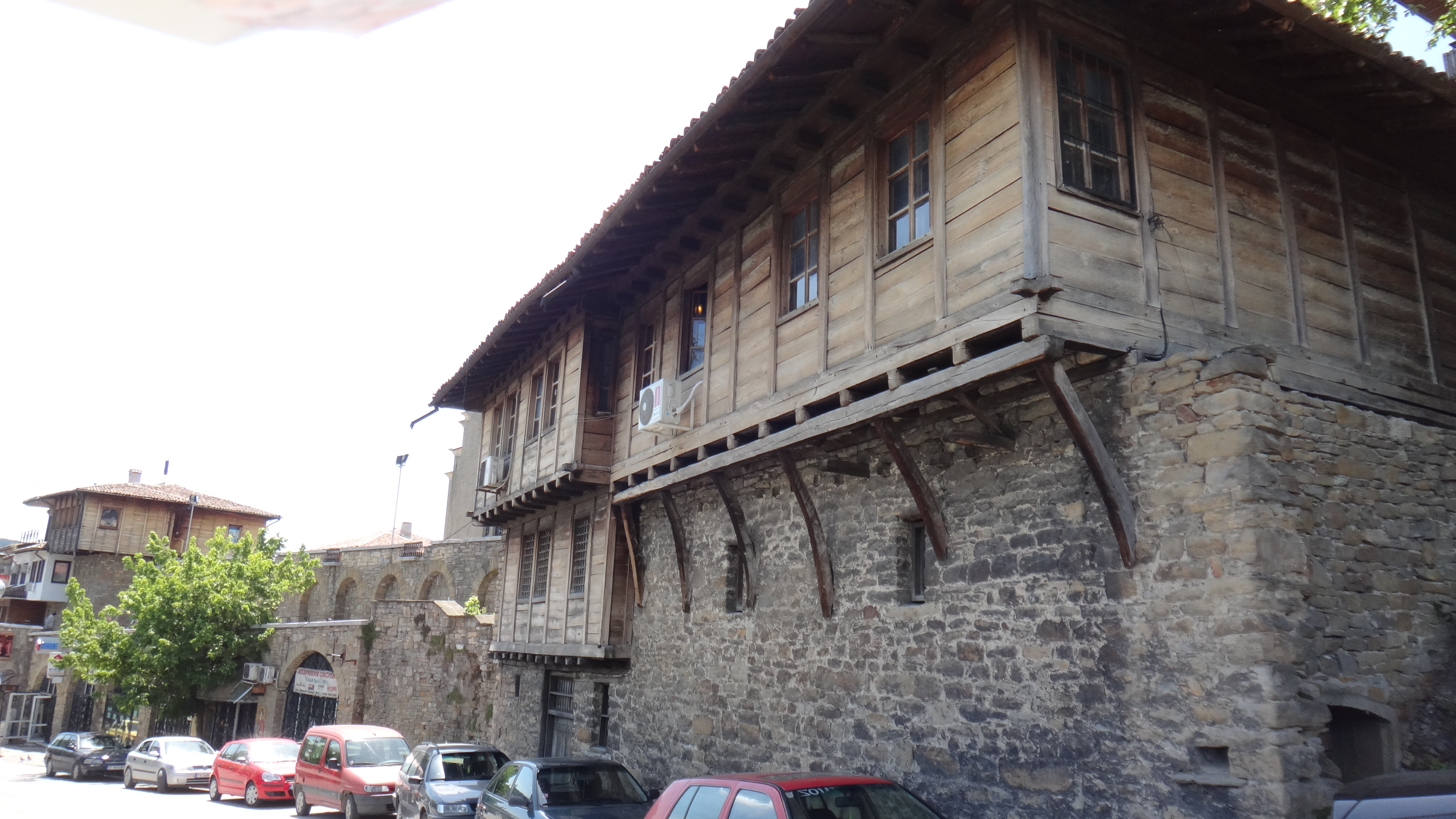

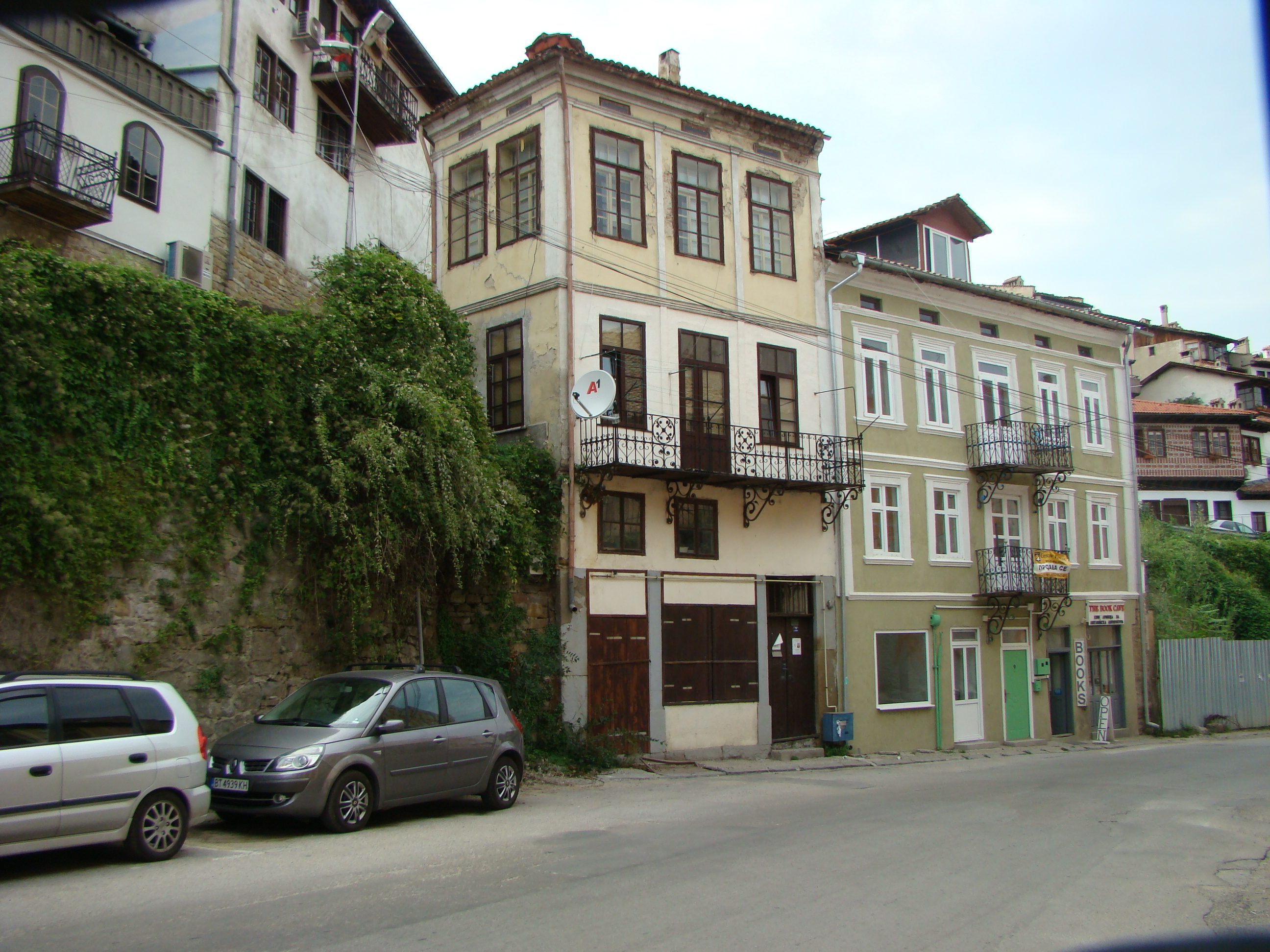

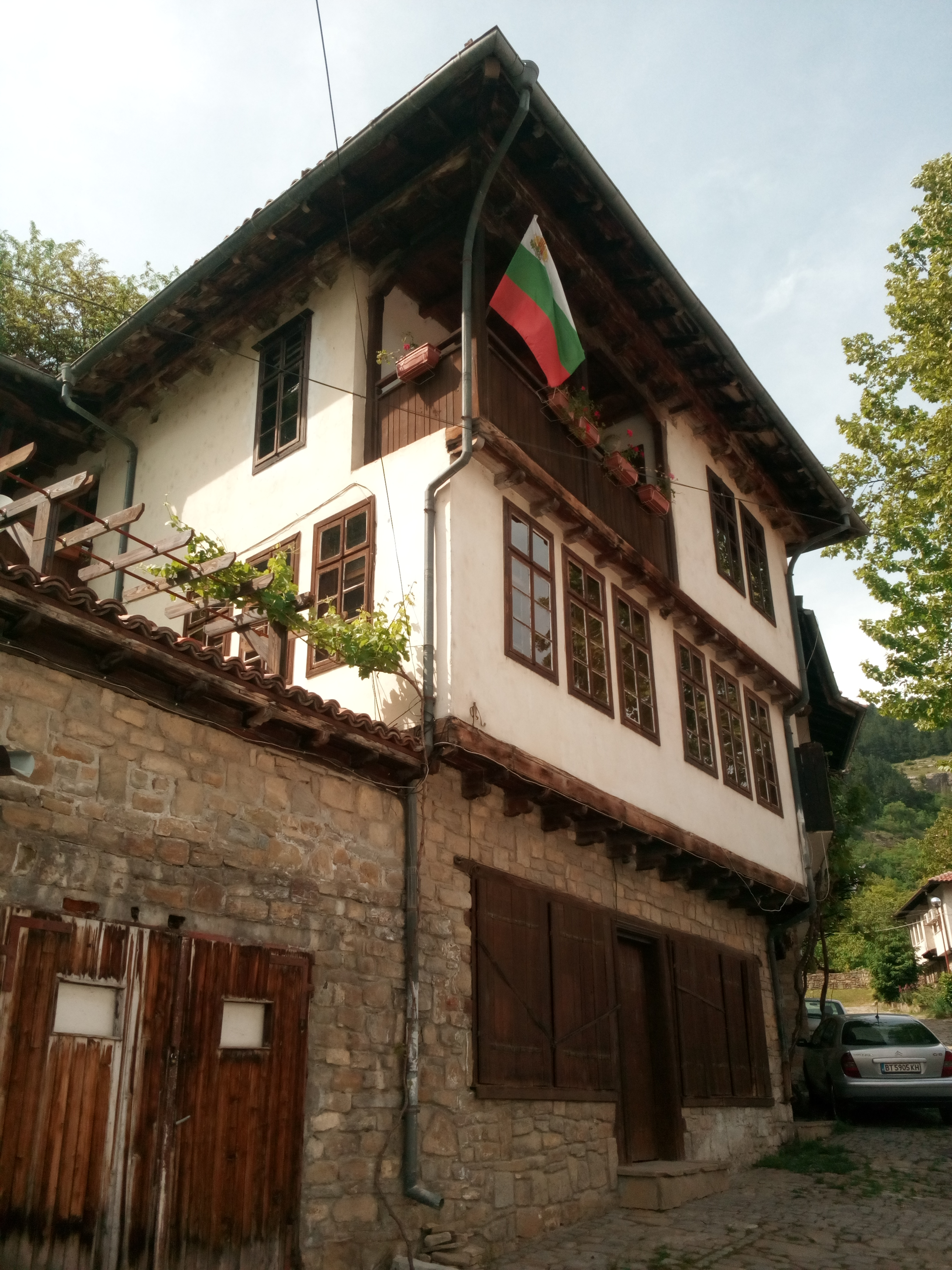

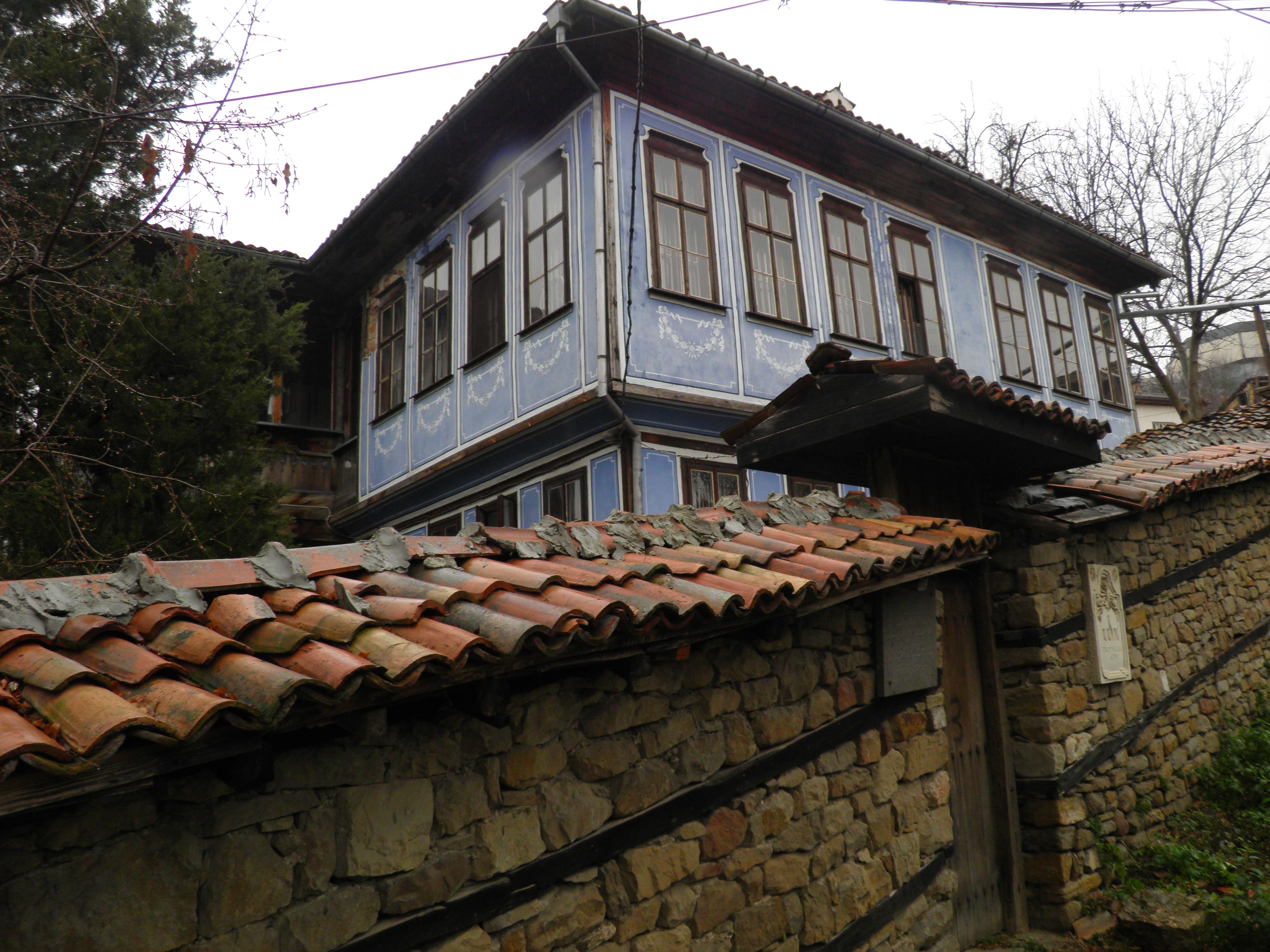
The house of Boris Denev

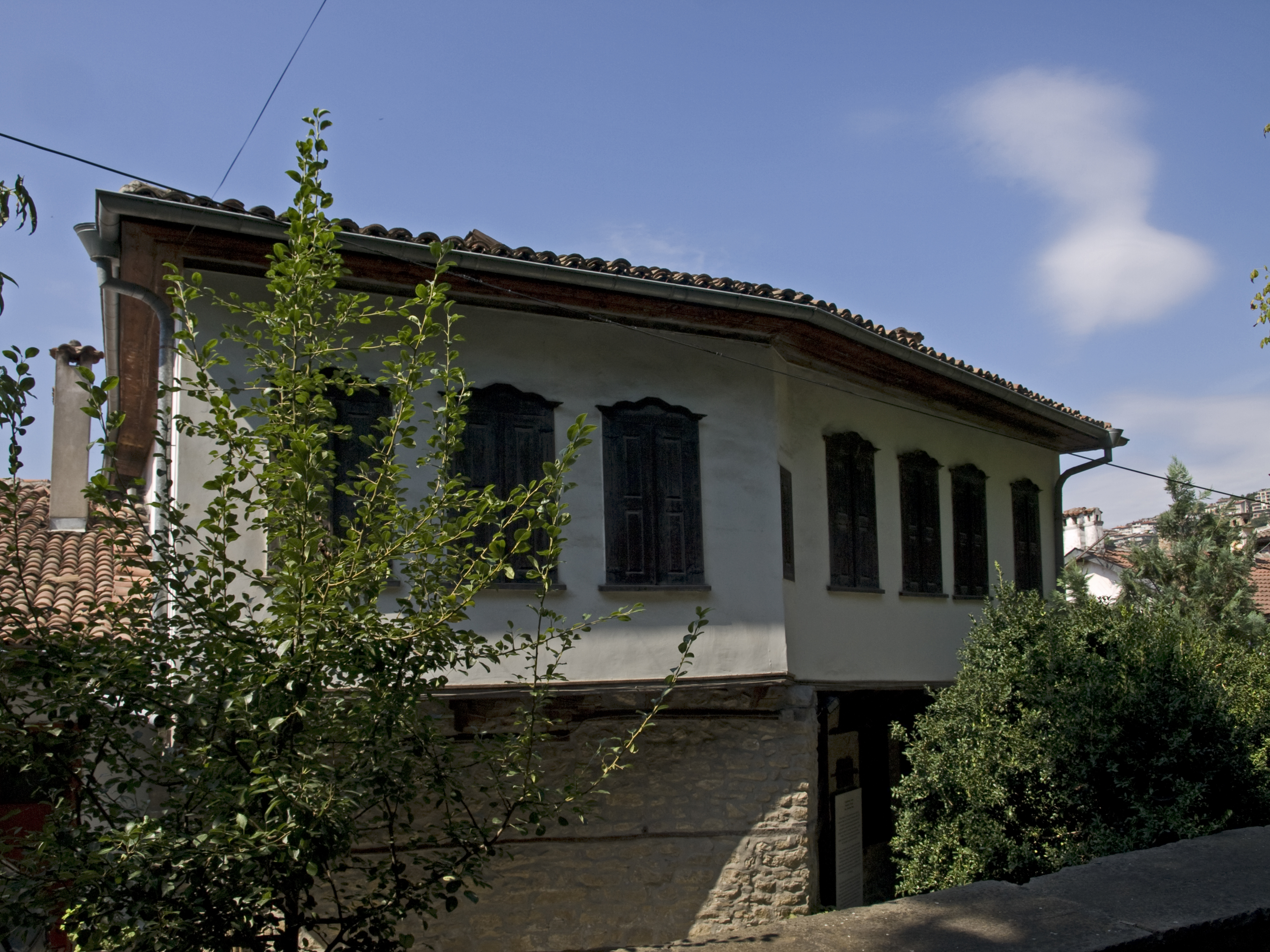
Sarafkina House

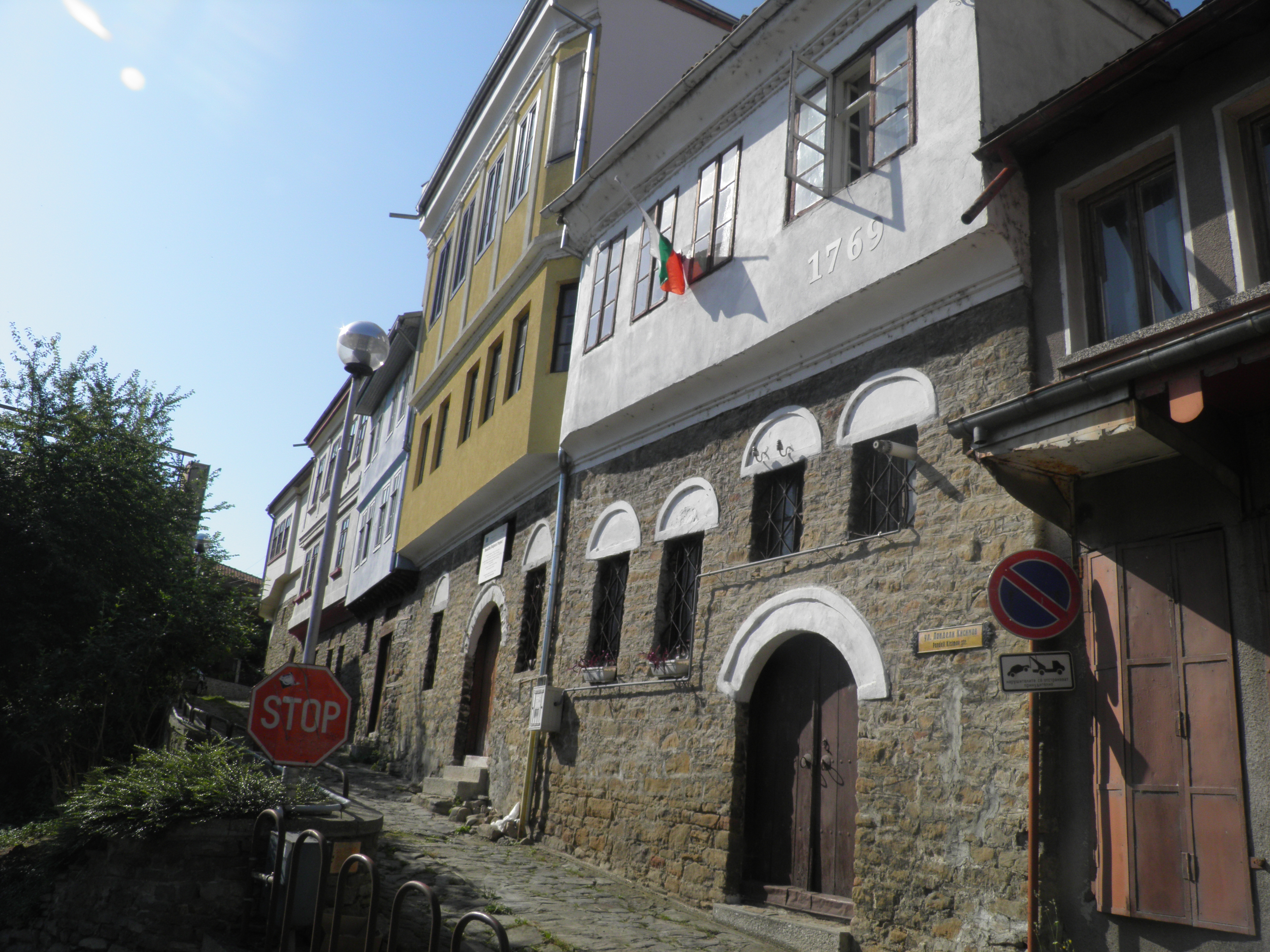
The consular houses

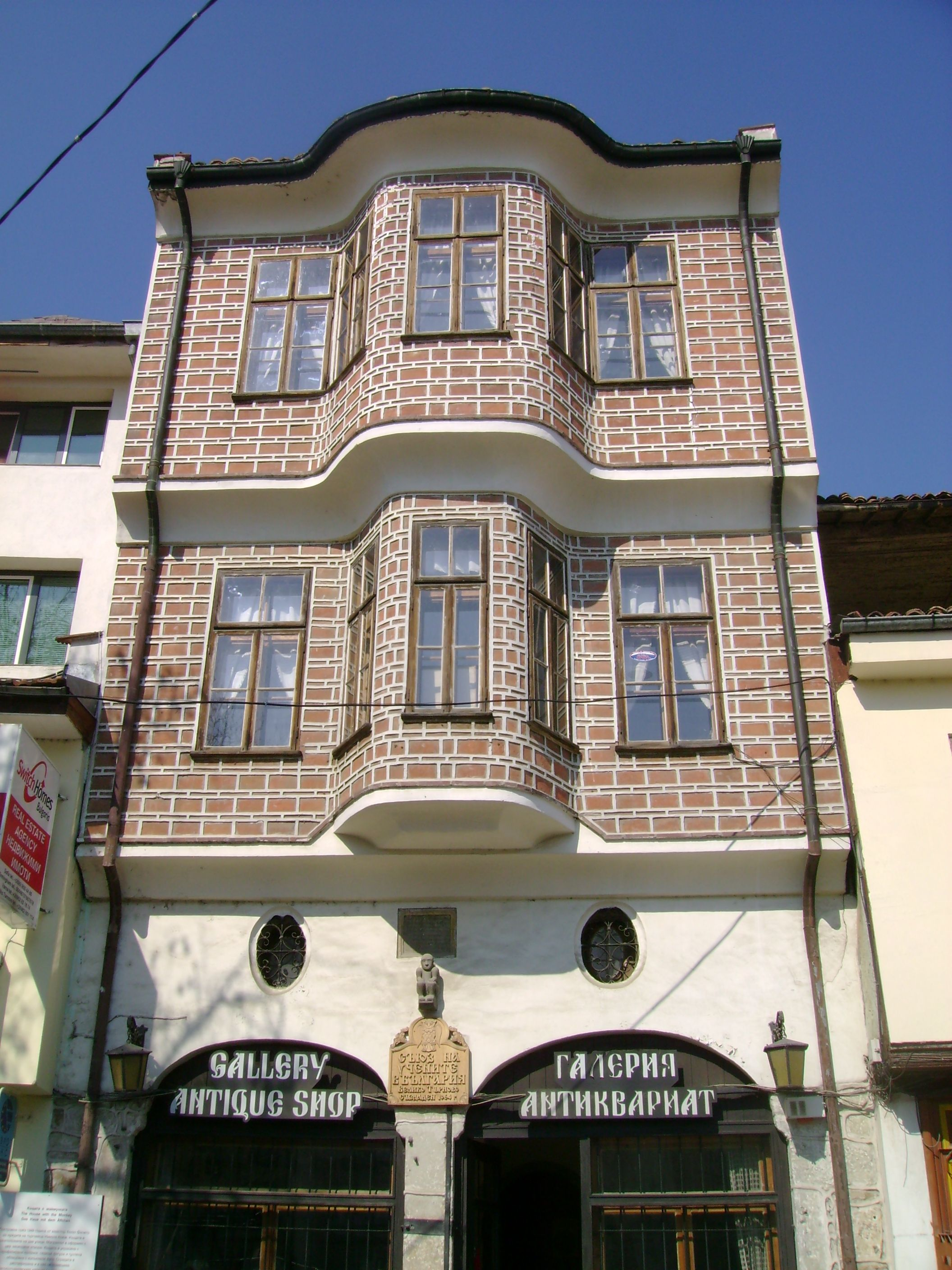
The house with the monkey

=== Renaissance Public buildings ===
Public buildings built by master Kolyu Ficheto during the Renaissance:Turkish Konak (Constituent Assembly Building), Inn of Hajji Nicoli.

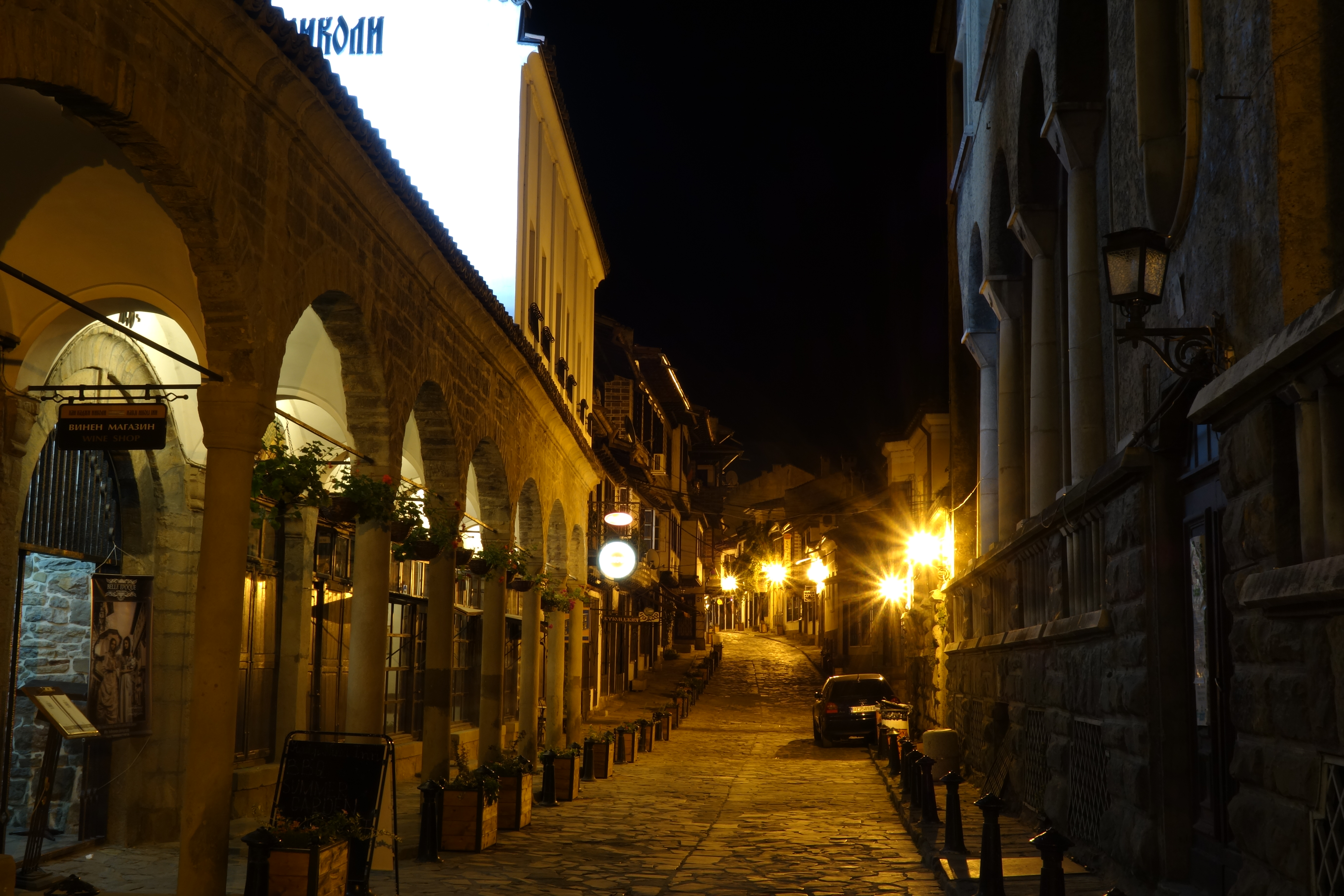
Inn of Hajji Nicoli(left)

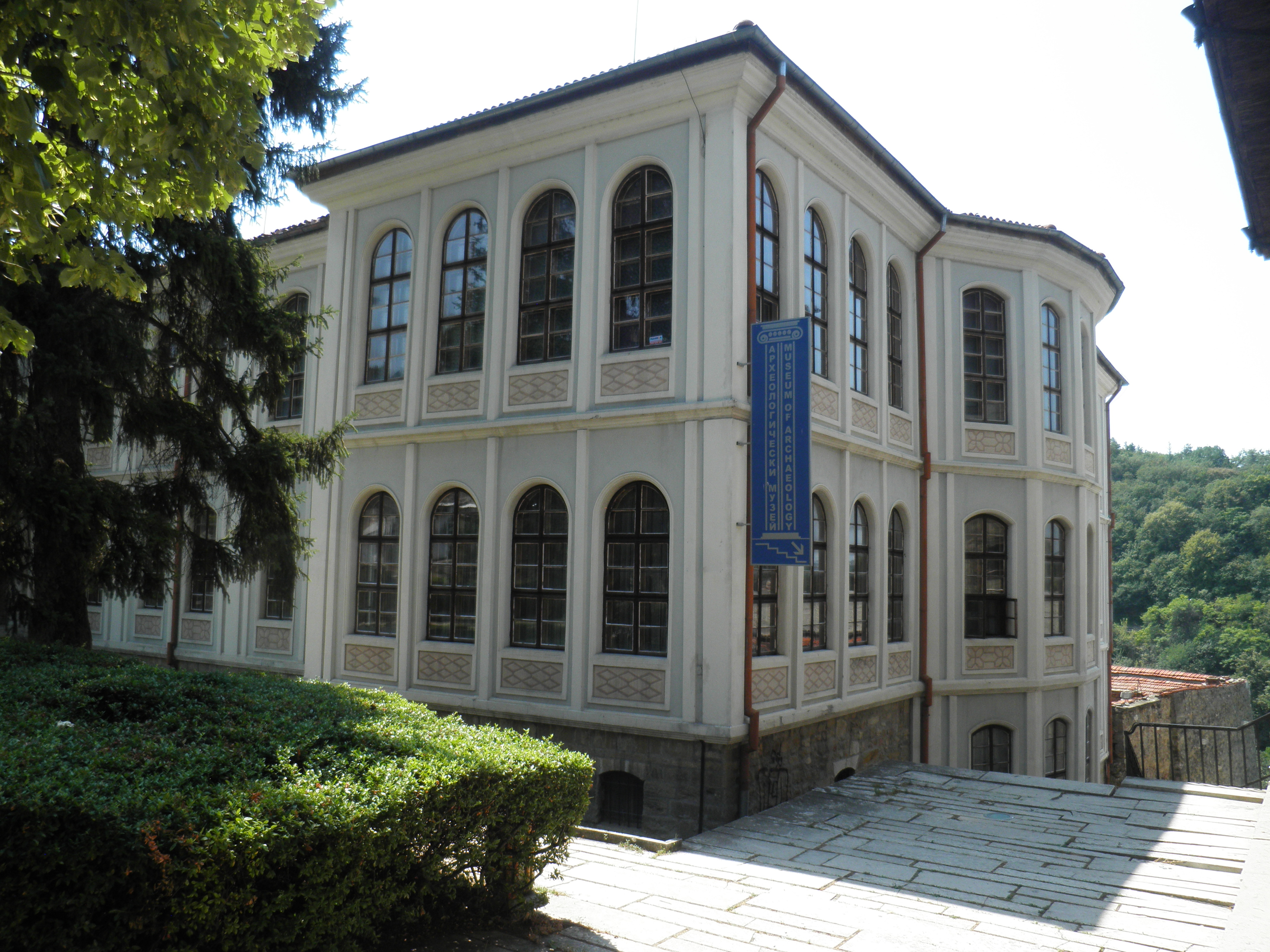
Constituent Assembly Building

== Baroque and Romanticism ==
The bourgeois houses are characterized by the replacement of the block construction with solid, stone and brick, the wooden joist with arches, iron beams and reinforced concrete construction. Since the beginning of the century, houses and public buildings have been built in the city, which have elements of modernism and Western European Baroque. architecture in the city, built at the beginning of the 20th century. Very common in Bulgarian Romanticism, which was owned by wealthier Bulgarians, is found on today's Independence Street.

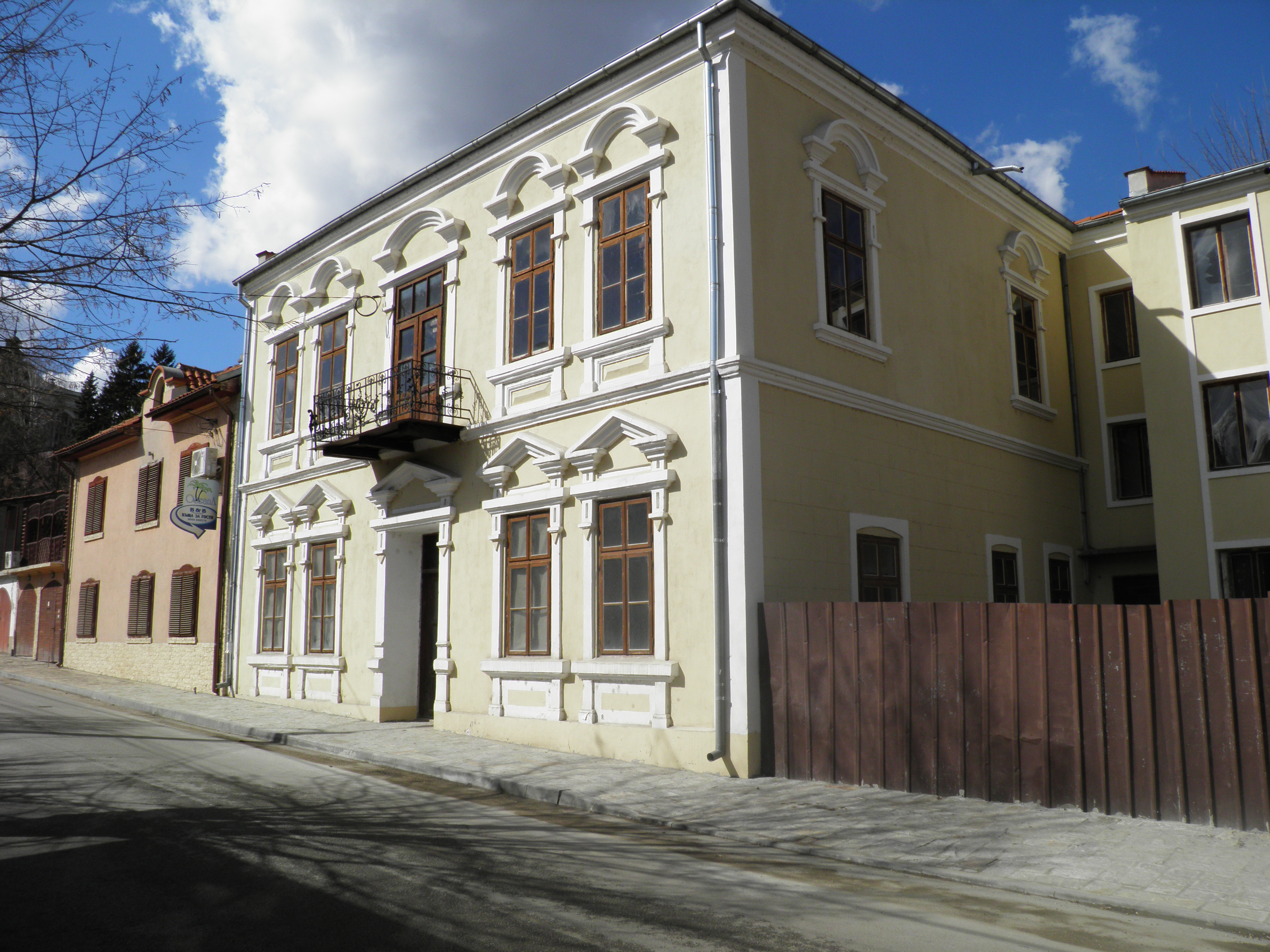

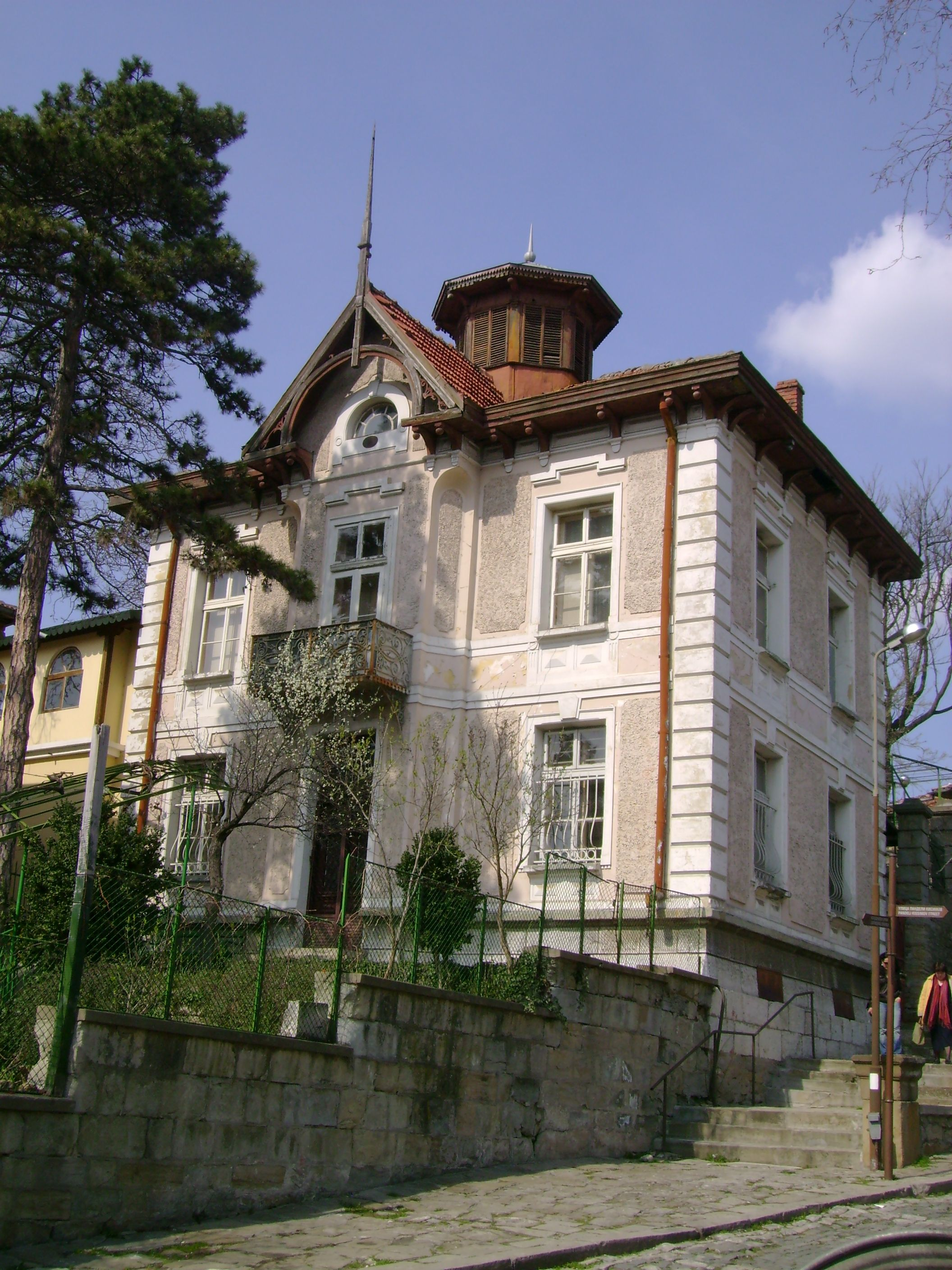
The house of the metropolis

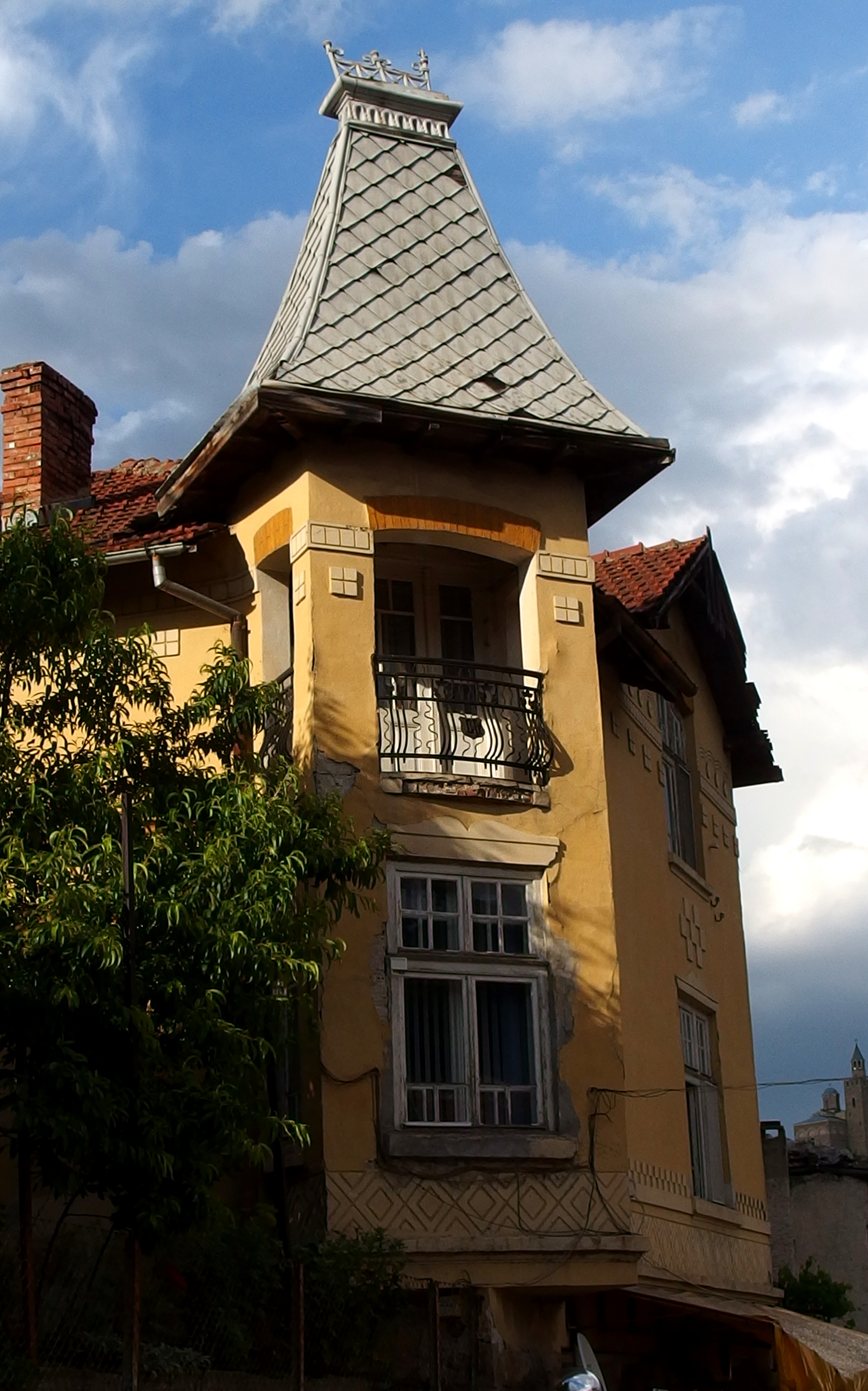
The house of the architect

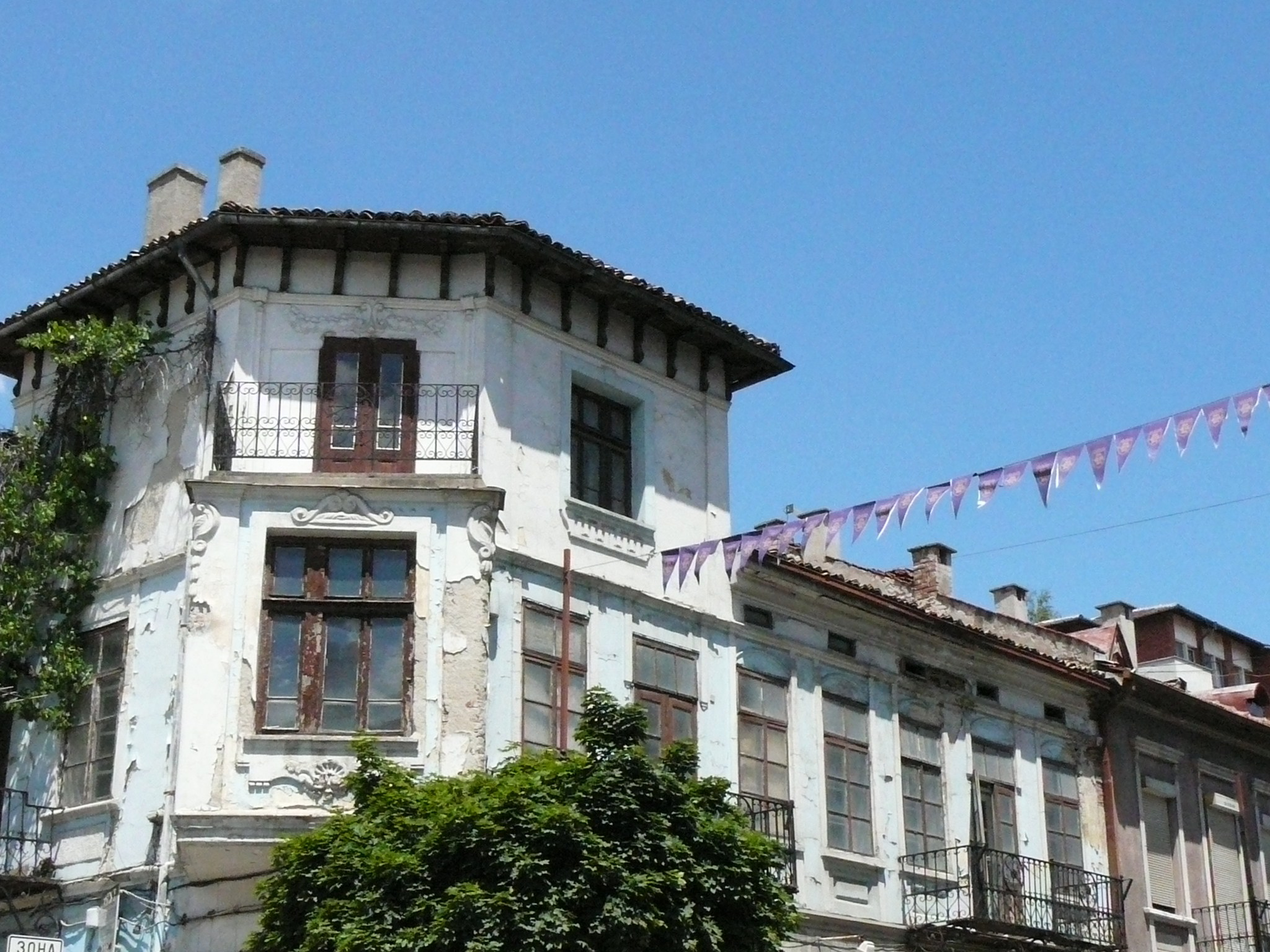

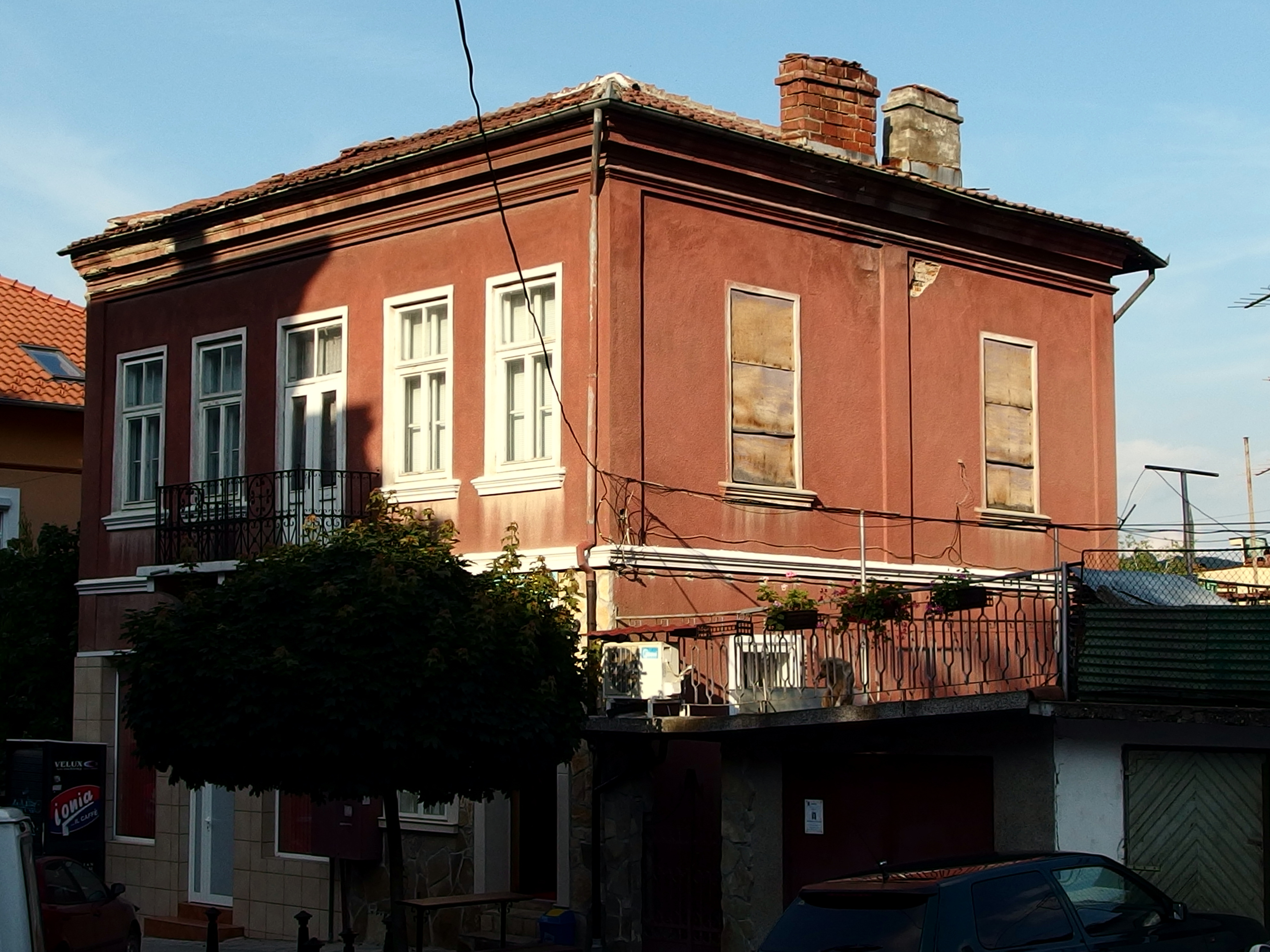
The house of General Mihov

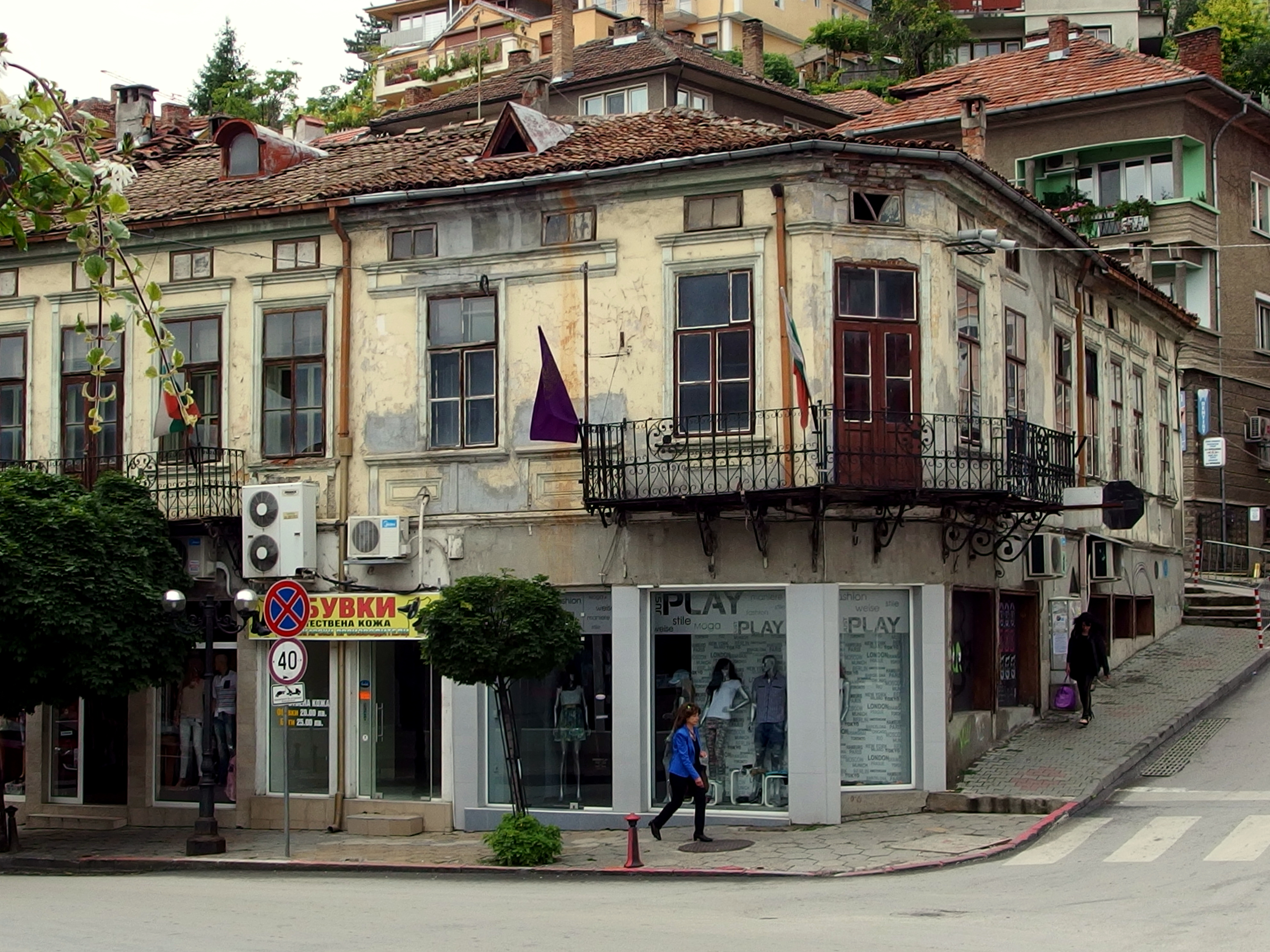

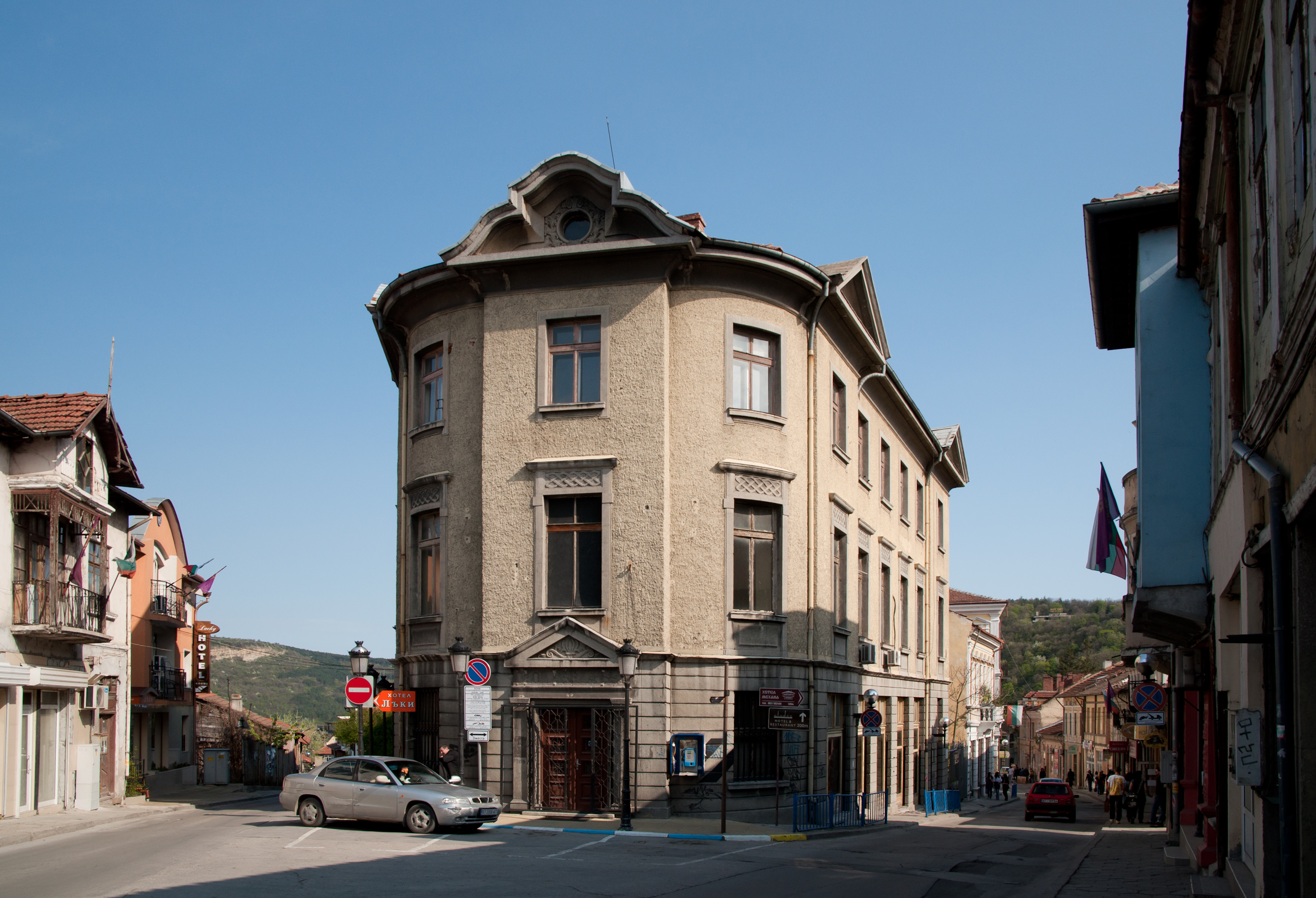

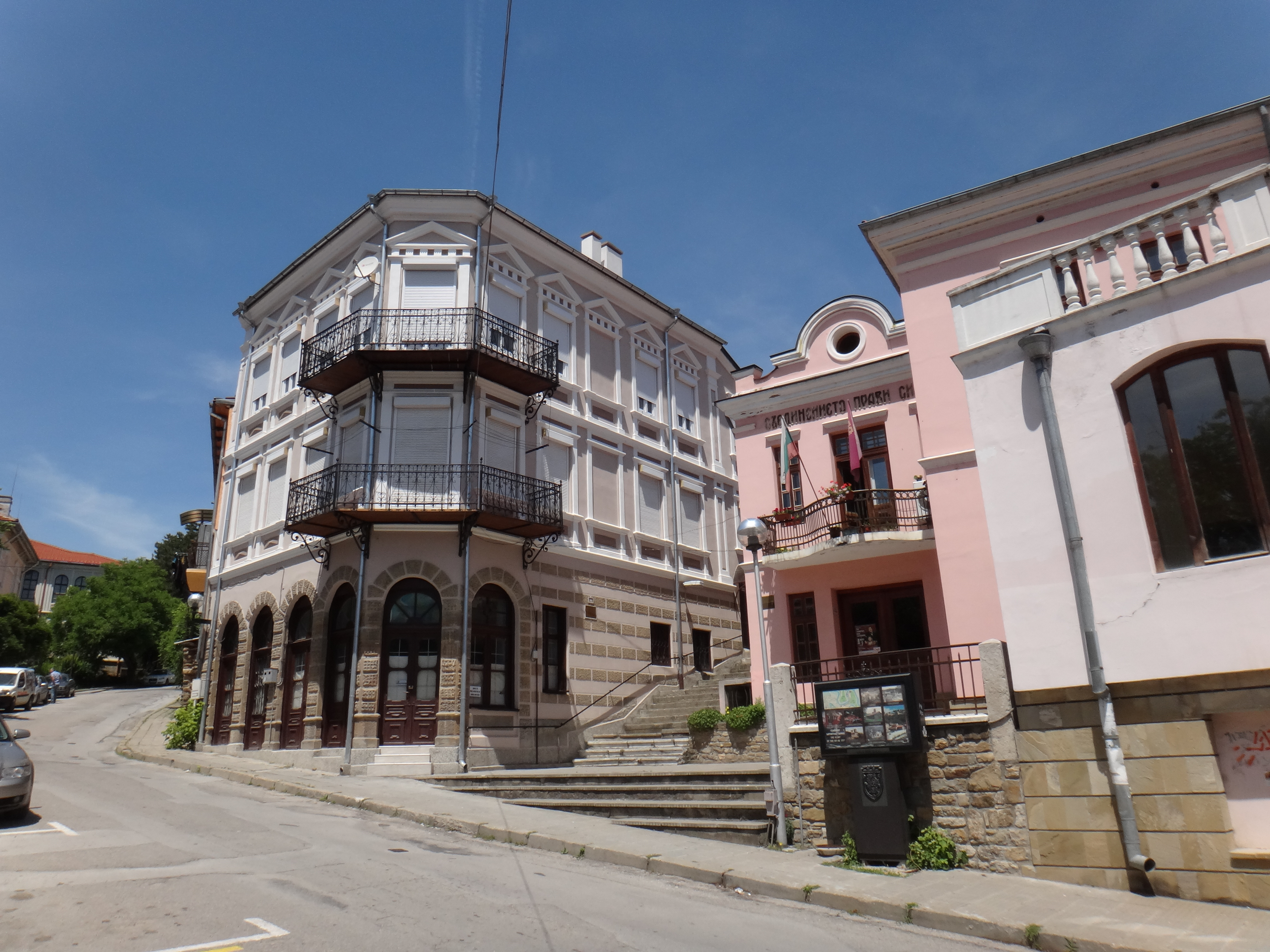

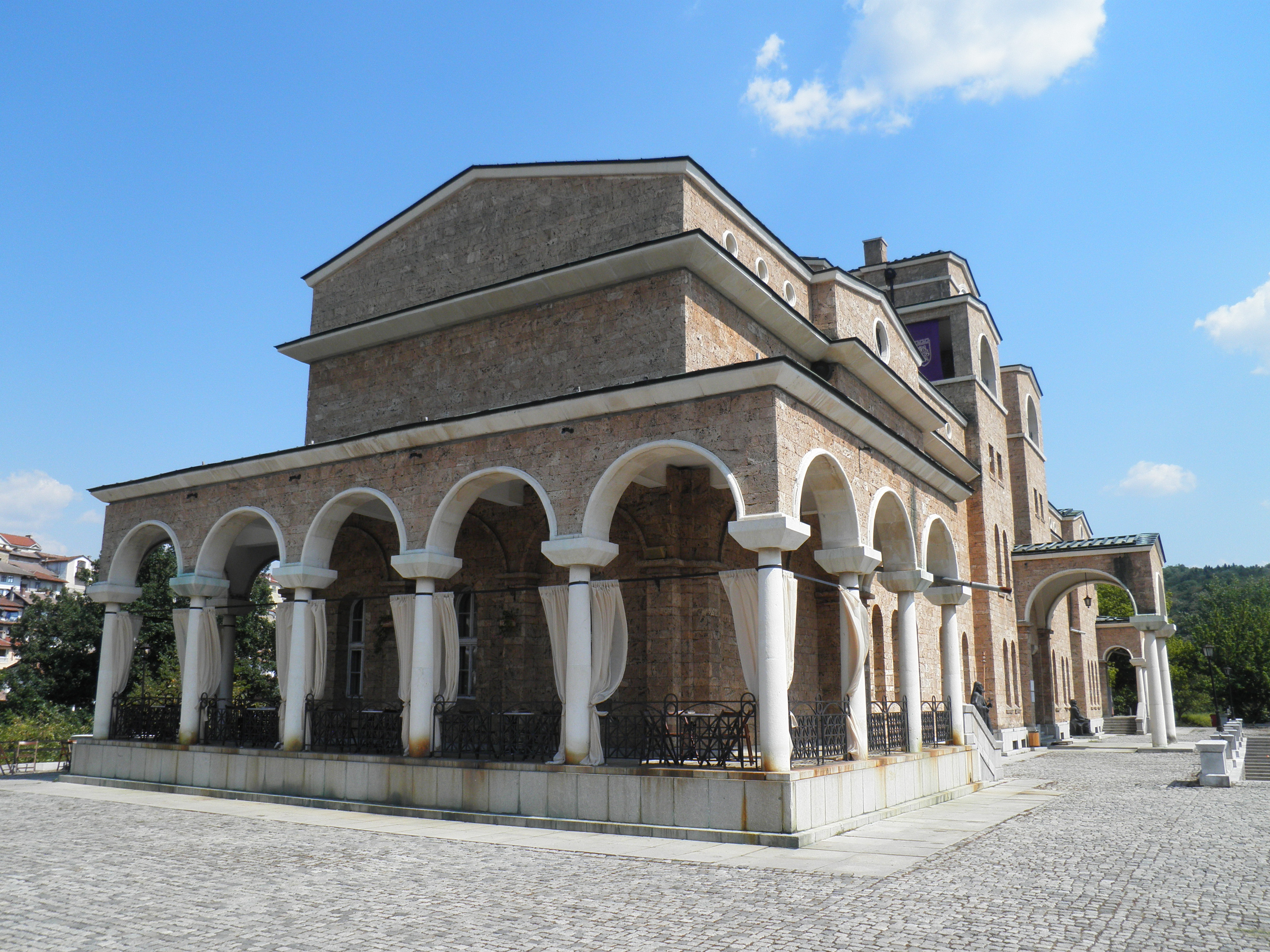
Town Gallery

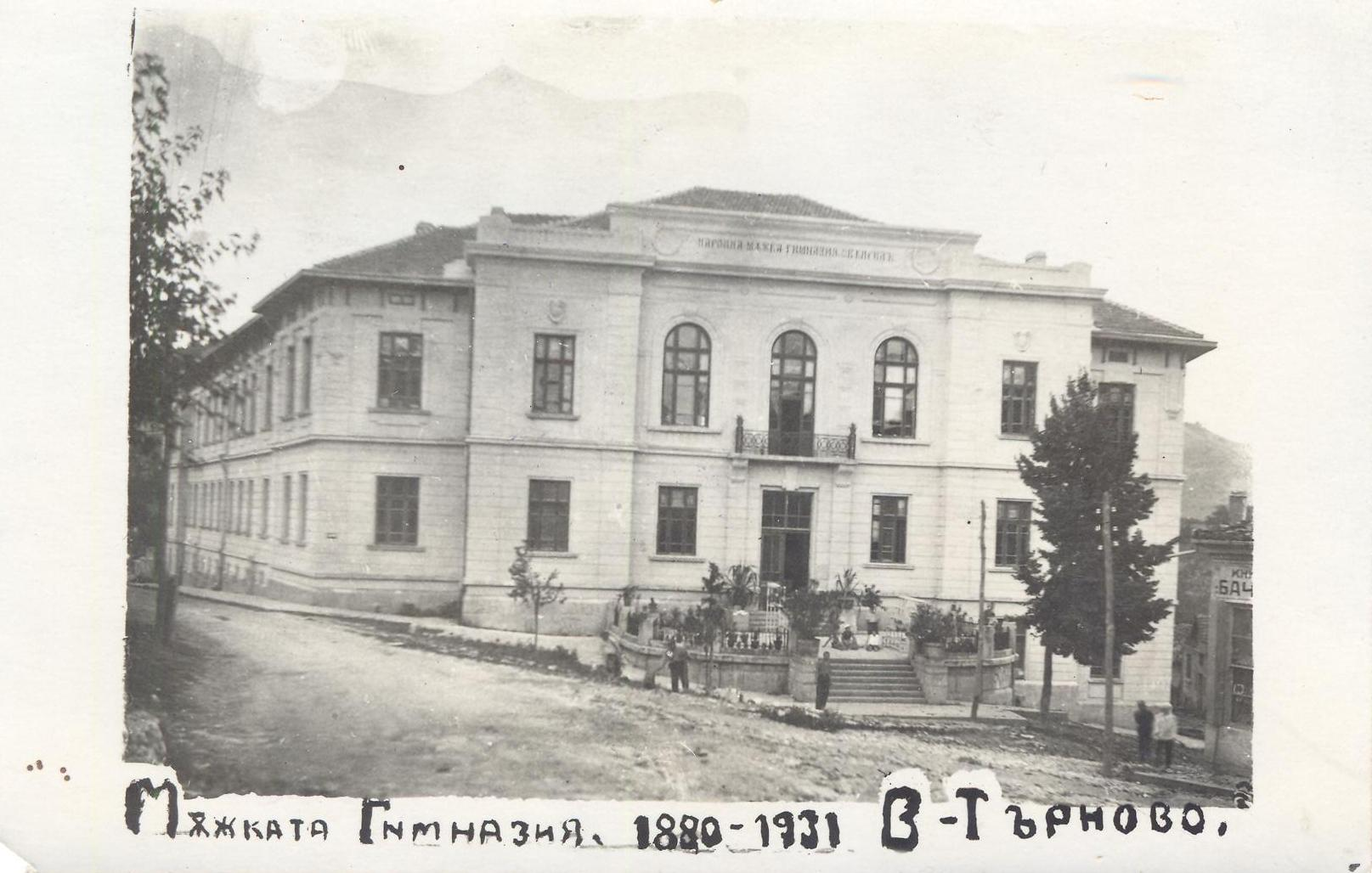
First men's high school

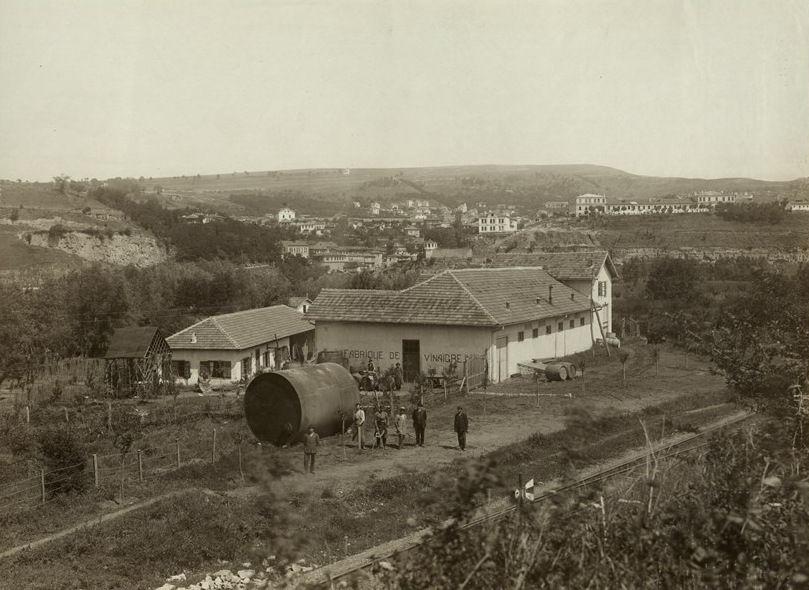
Former factory

== Socialist period ==
During the socialist period, most newly constructed buildings and cooperatives were built in the monolithic system. The buildings were characterized by clear and straight lines.

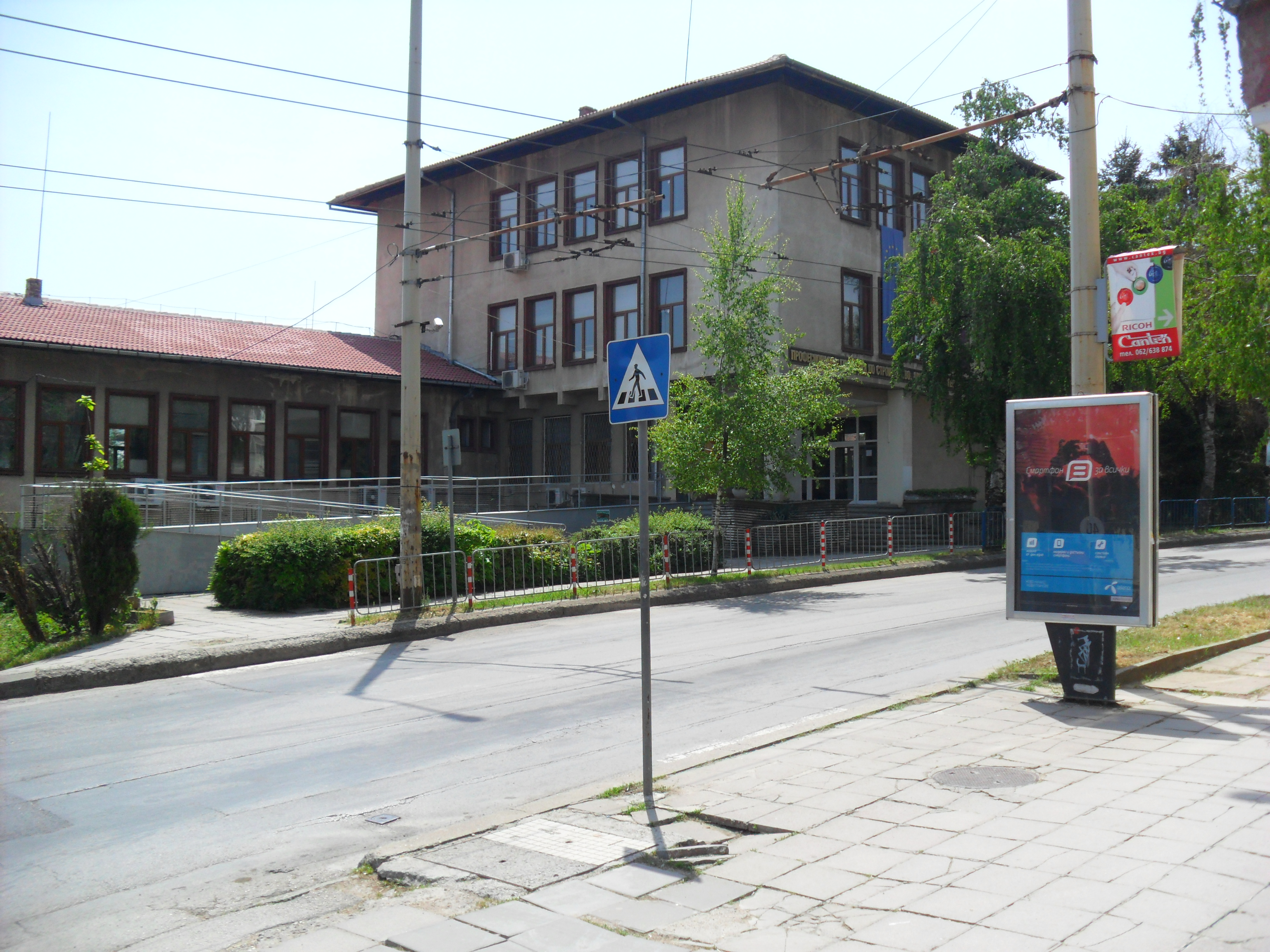
Angel Popov School of Architecture and Surveying the project of the building is of arch. Nedelcho Paskalev

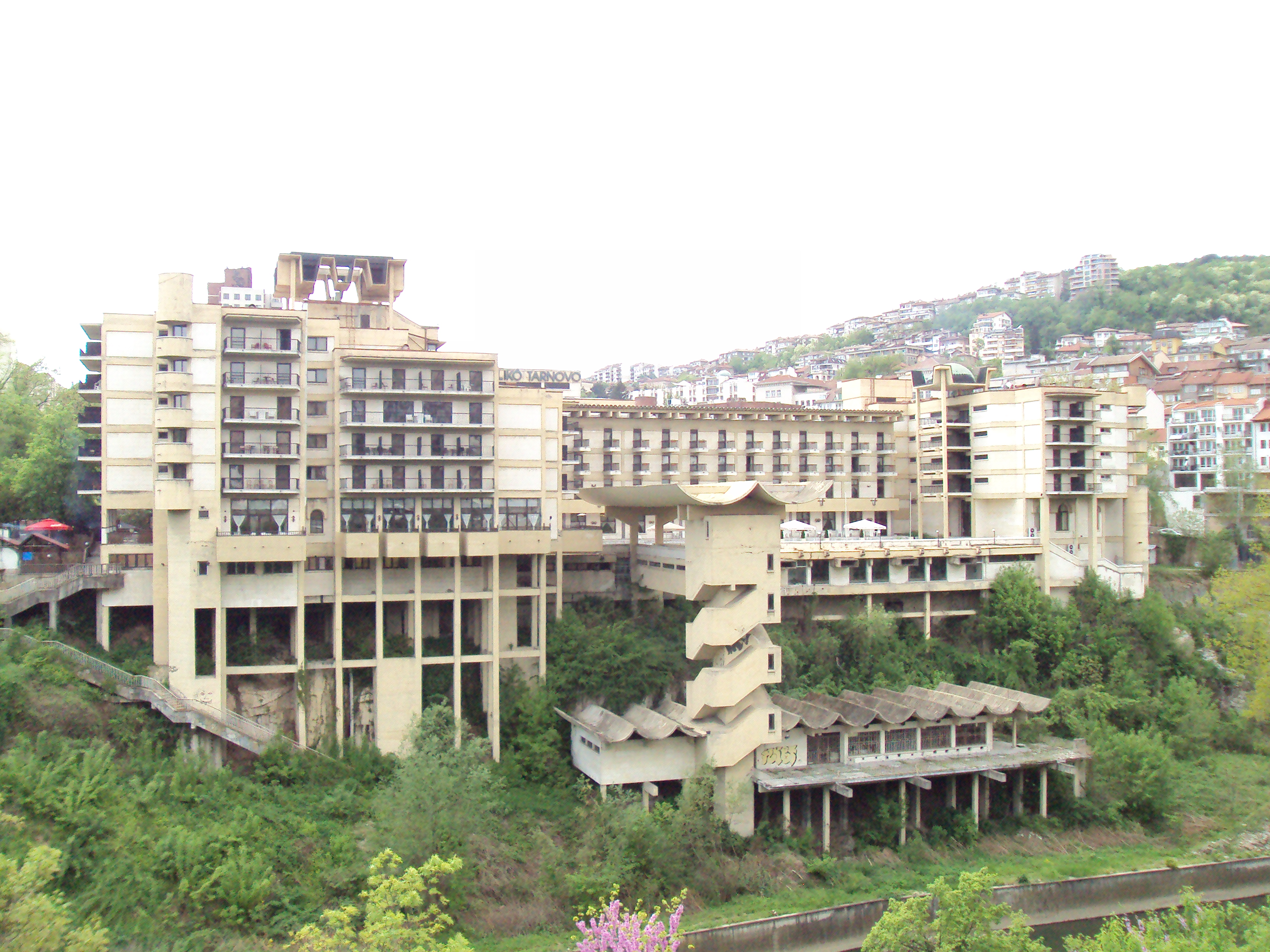
Modern hotel

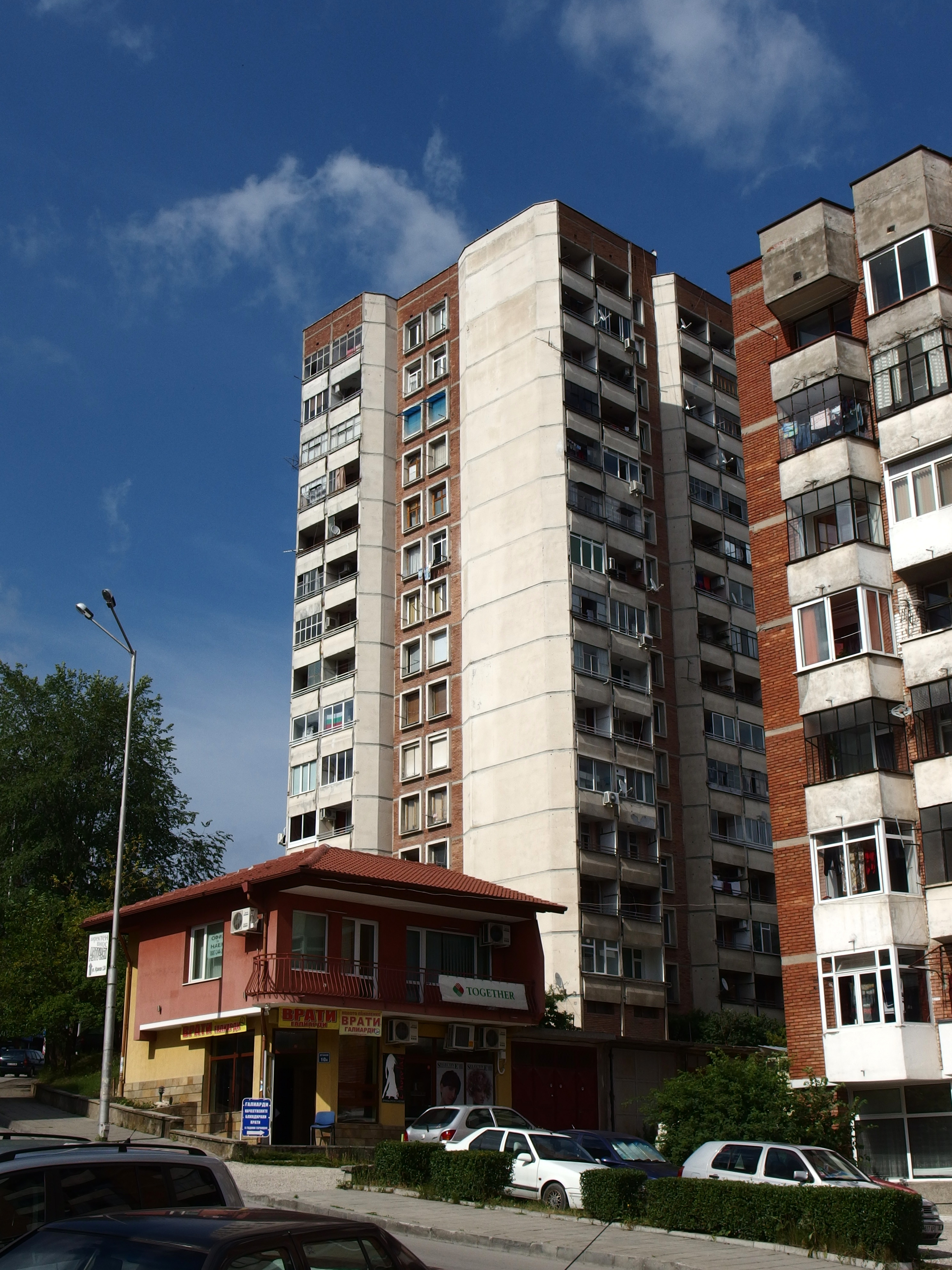

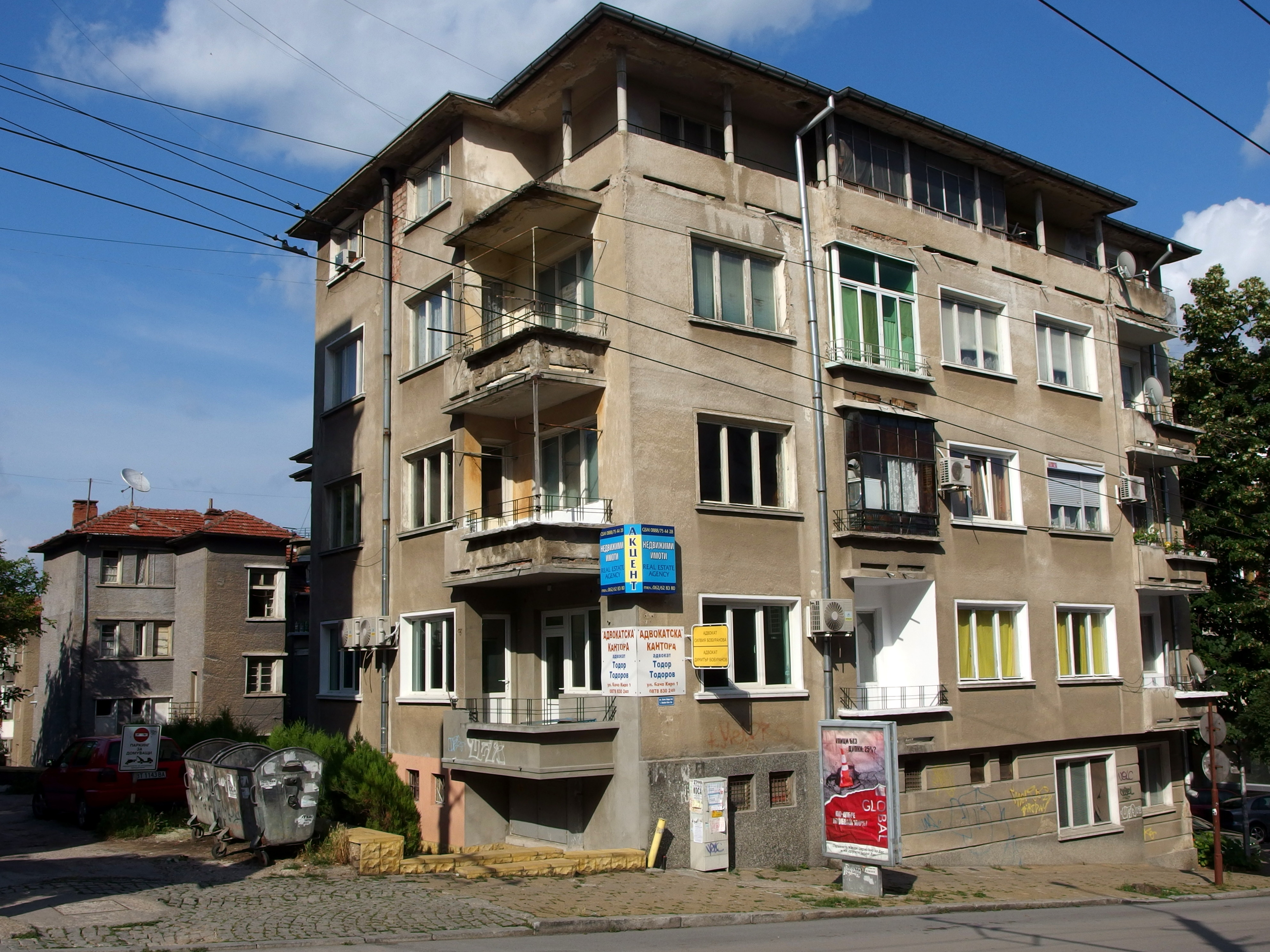

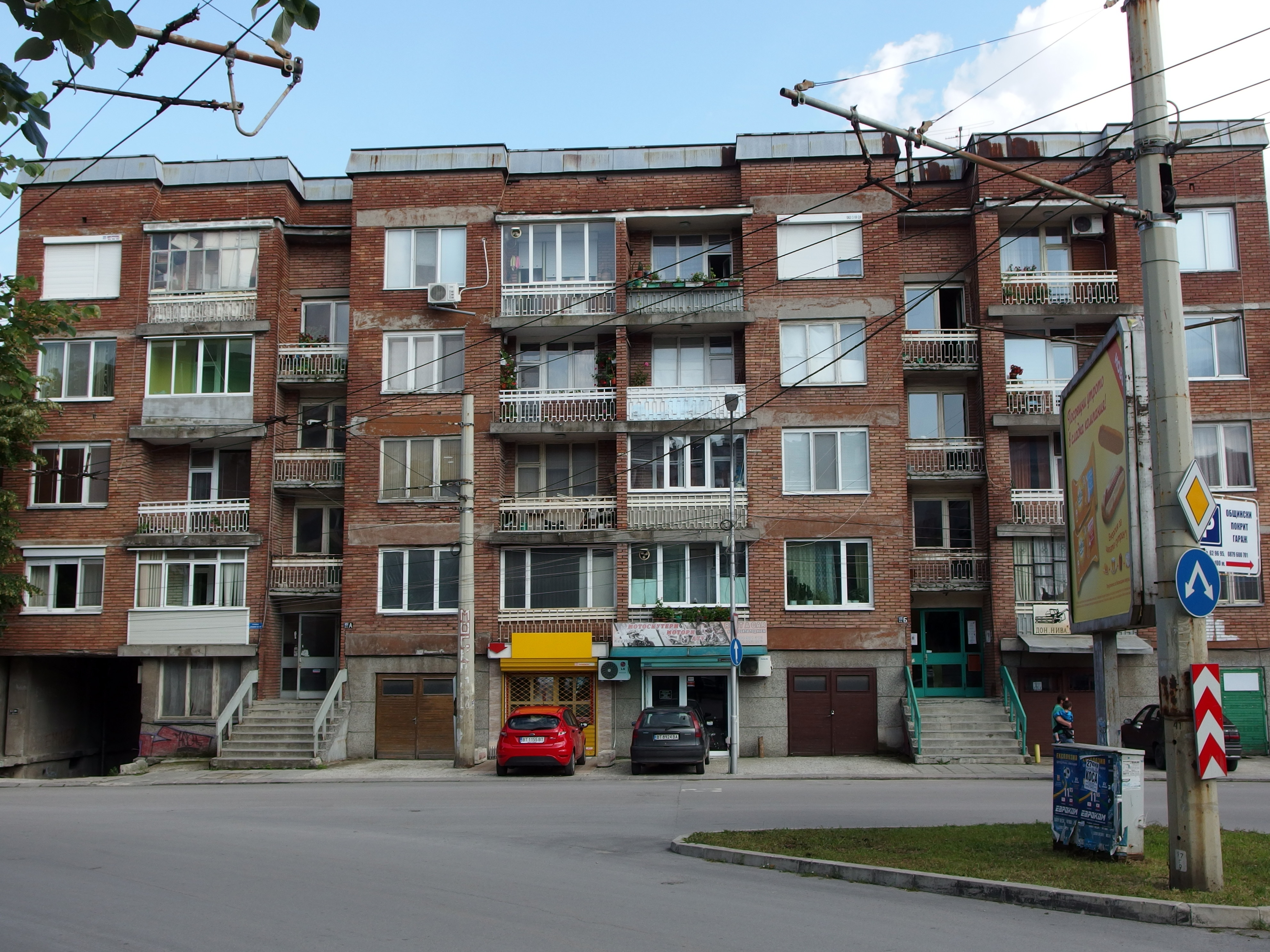

== Modernism ==
In this style, there are different architectural trends. Increasingly, most commonly the glass is used as an element of the building

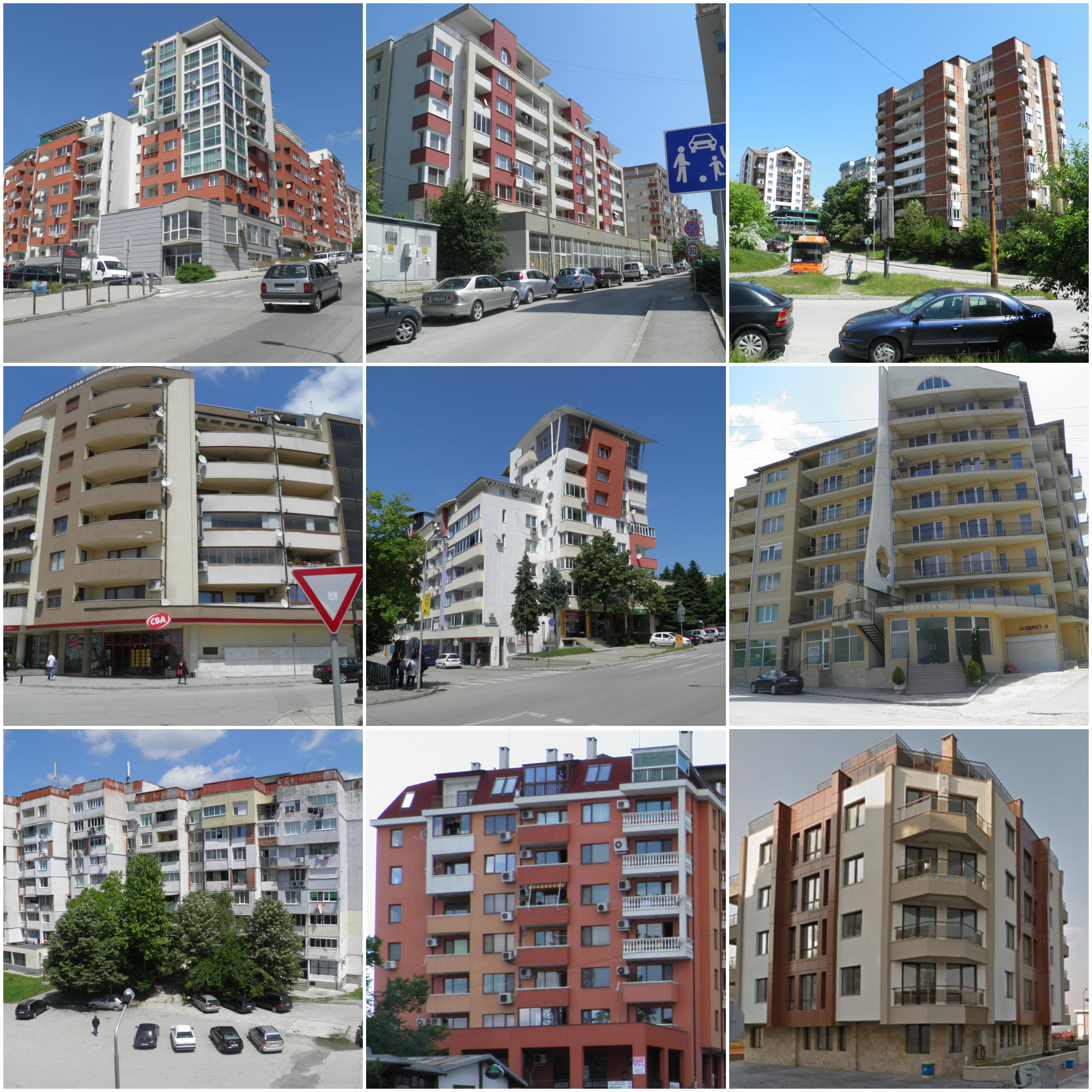

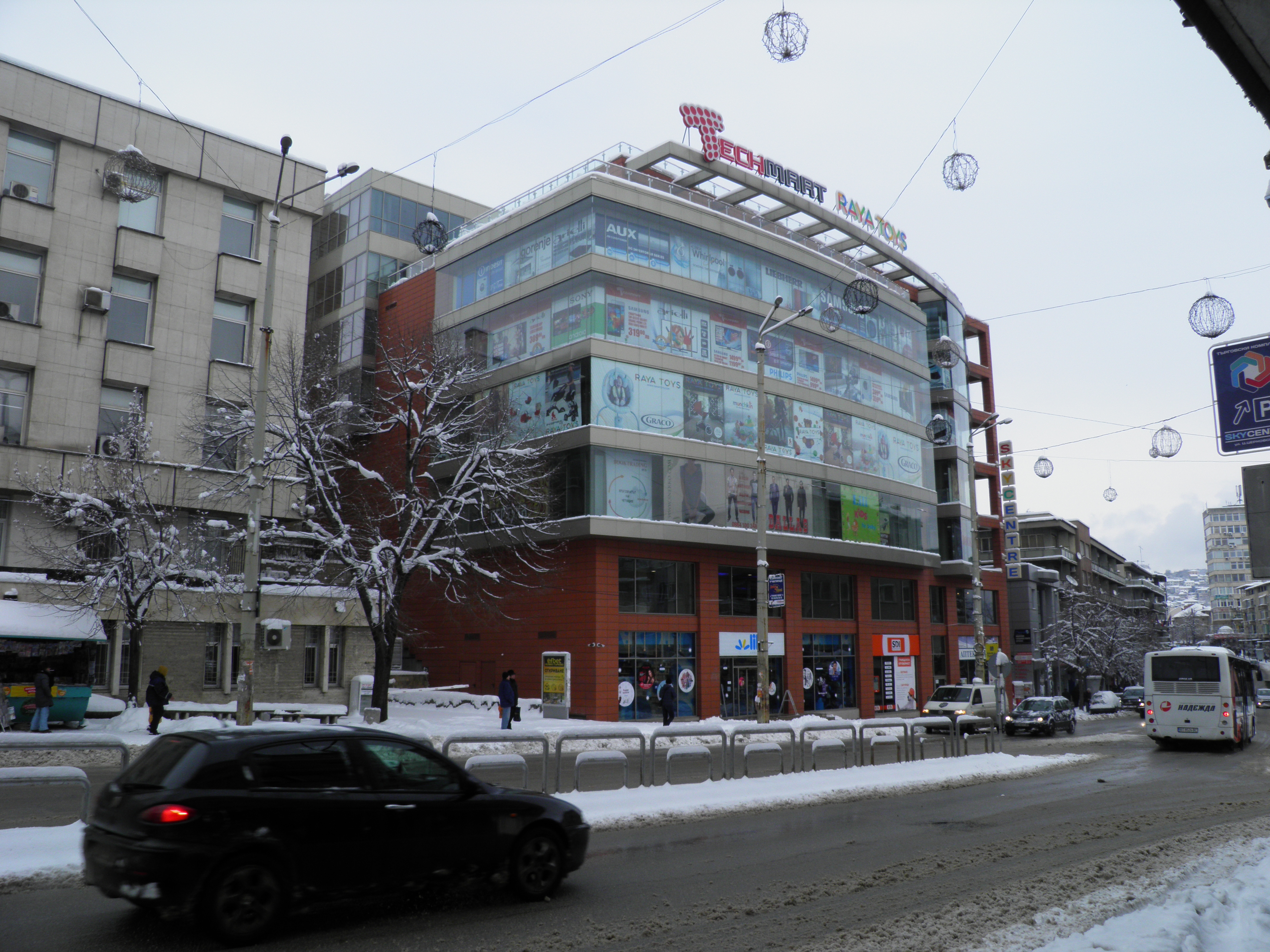

== Public buildings ==
These types of buildings are arrays, with a different concept of the master or group of architects who designed the buildings.

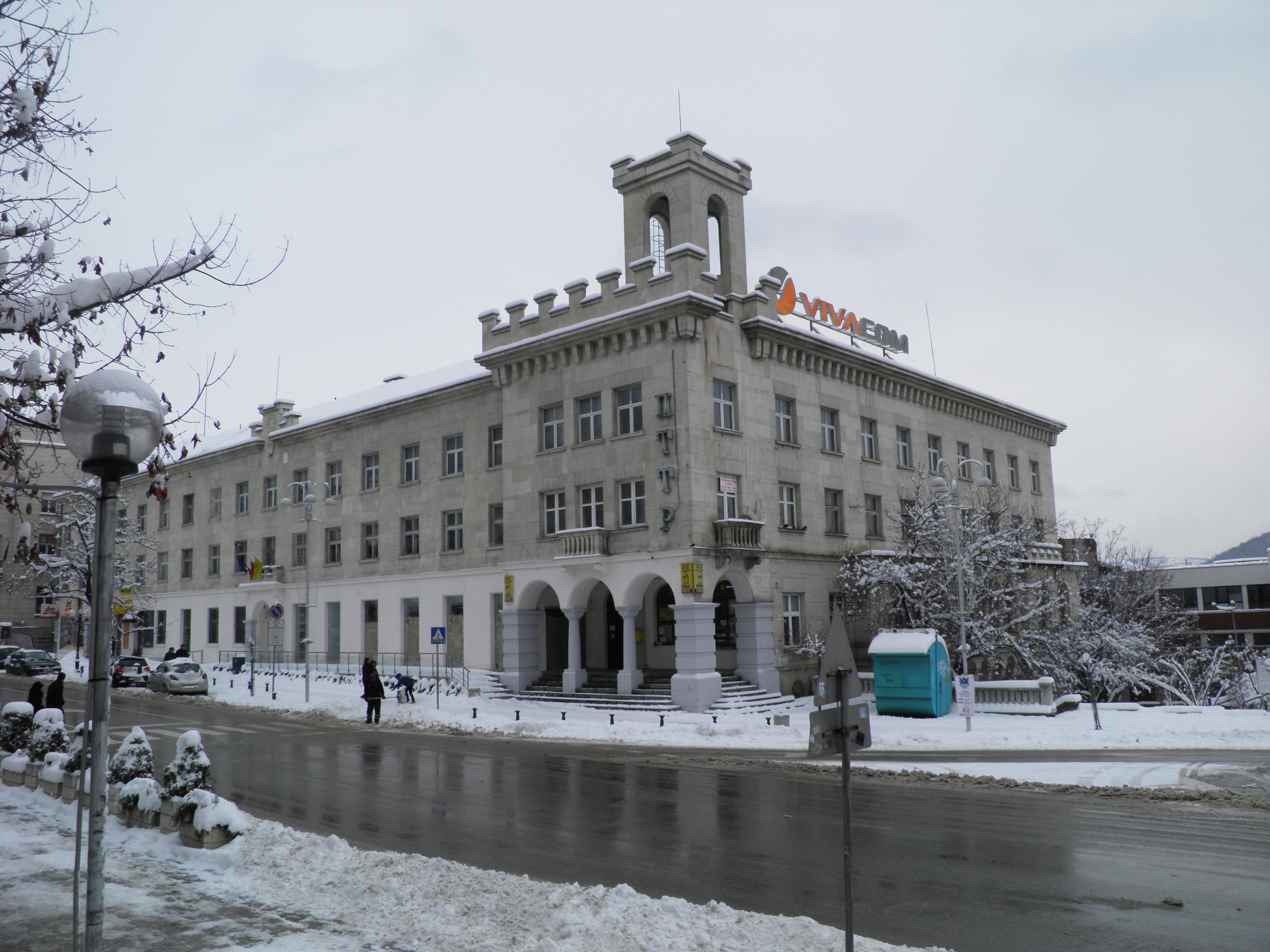
Post office built 70s

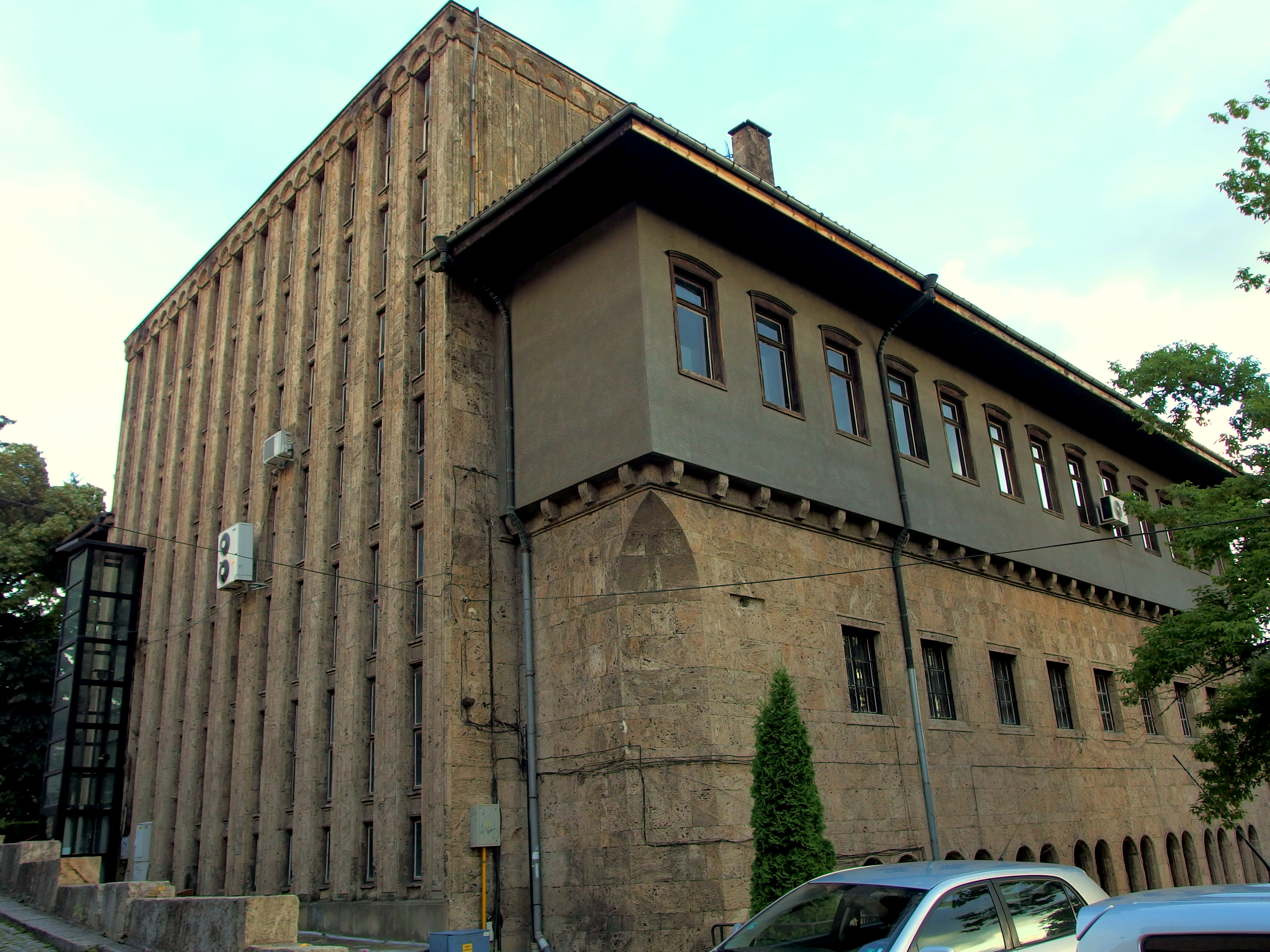
Library

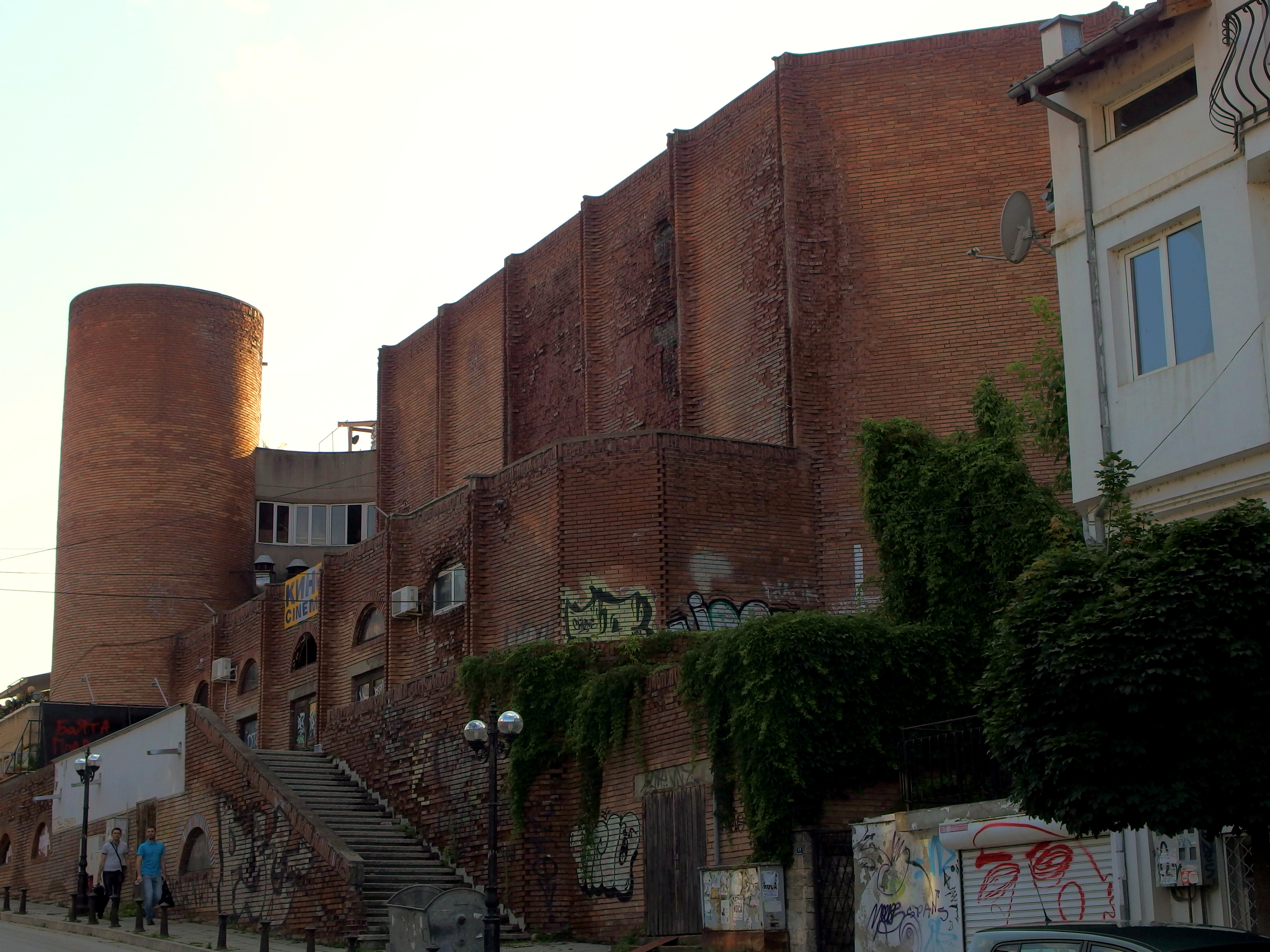
Cinema Poltava

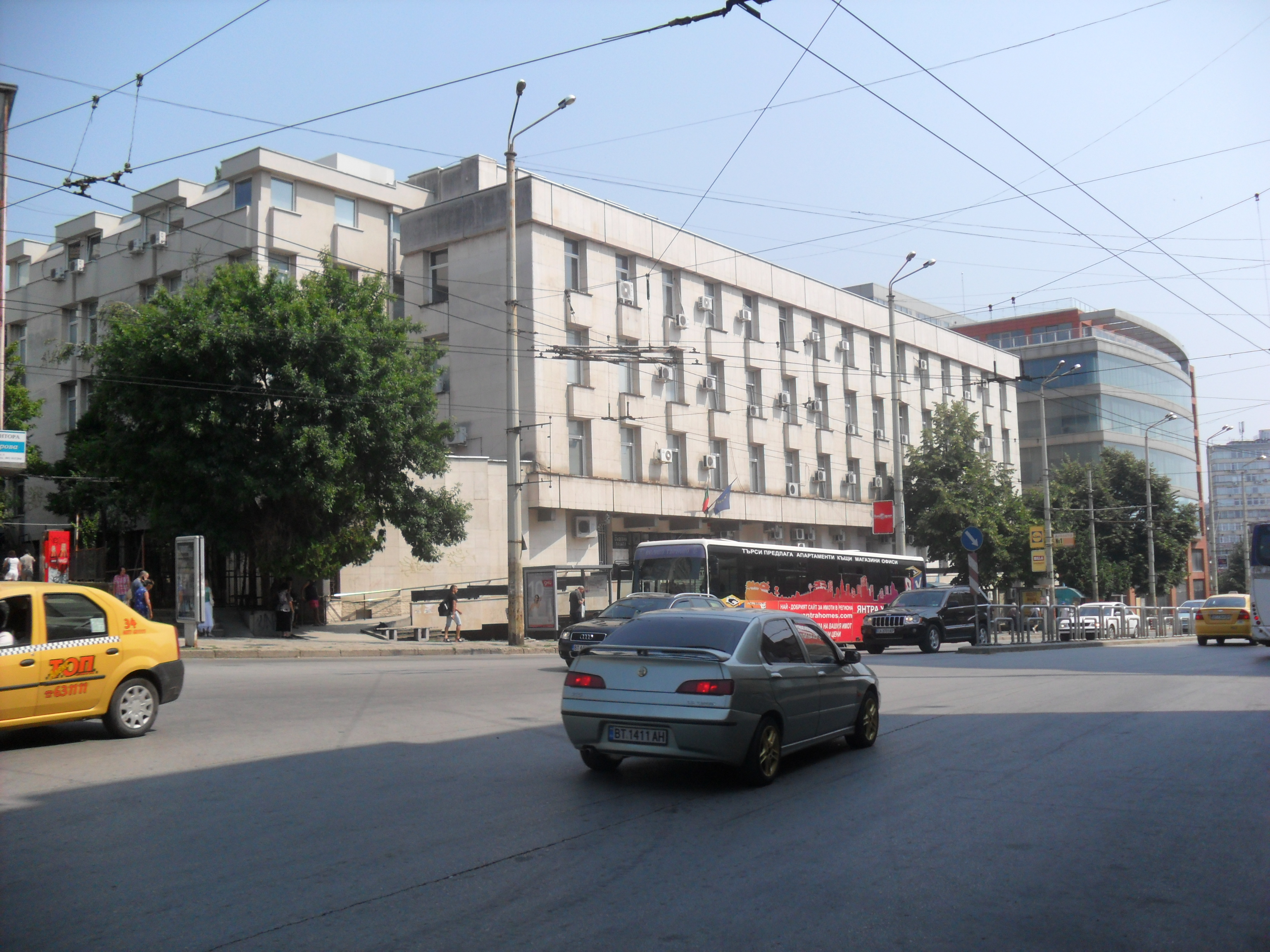
Court

== See also ==
- Architecture of the Tarnovo Artistic School
