= Culture of Bulgaria =

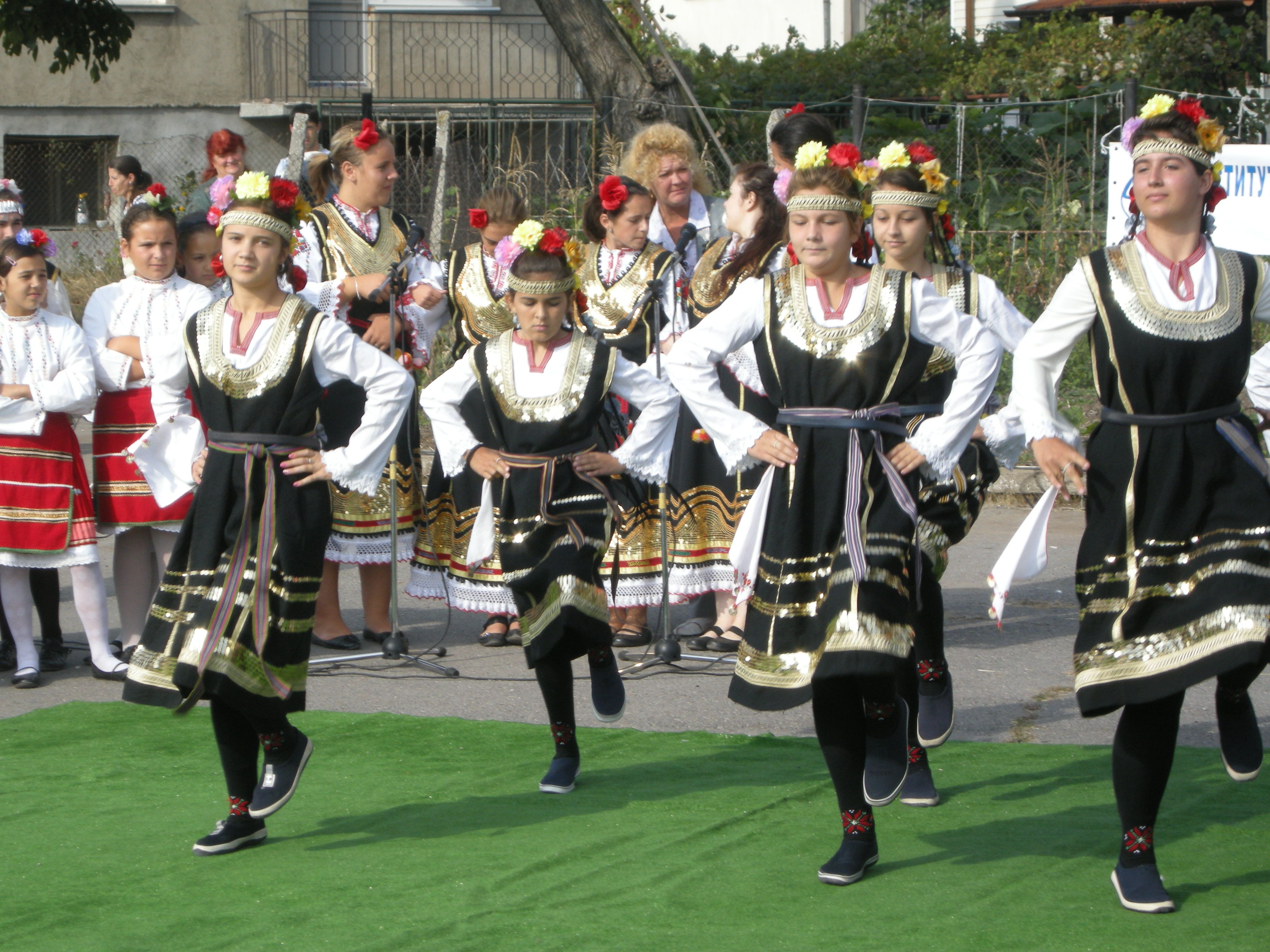
Bulgarian traditional dance.

Bulgarian culture has deep roots in the traditions of the indigenous Thracian heritage and the Slavic peoples who settled the Balkans in the early Middle Ages. It consolidated during the First Bulgarian Empire with influence from the Byzantine civilisation and Eastern Christianity followed by a cultural and technological exchange with the Ottoman Empire during a long period of political subjugation starting in the Late Medieval period.

Material culture predates the Thracians. For example, the oldest known worked gold in the world, dating back to the 5th millennium BCE, was discovered at the Varna Necropolis.

Thracian heritage in Bulgaria includes numerous temples, tombs, treasures, and ancient ritual traditions. Some pre-Christian customs, such as Kukeri, Martenitsa, and rites connected with seasonal fertility, remain part of modern Bulgarian culture.

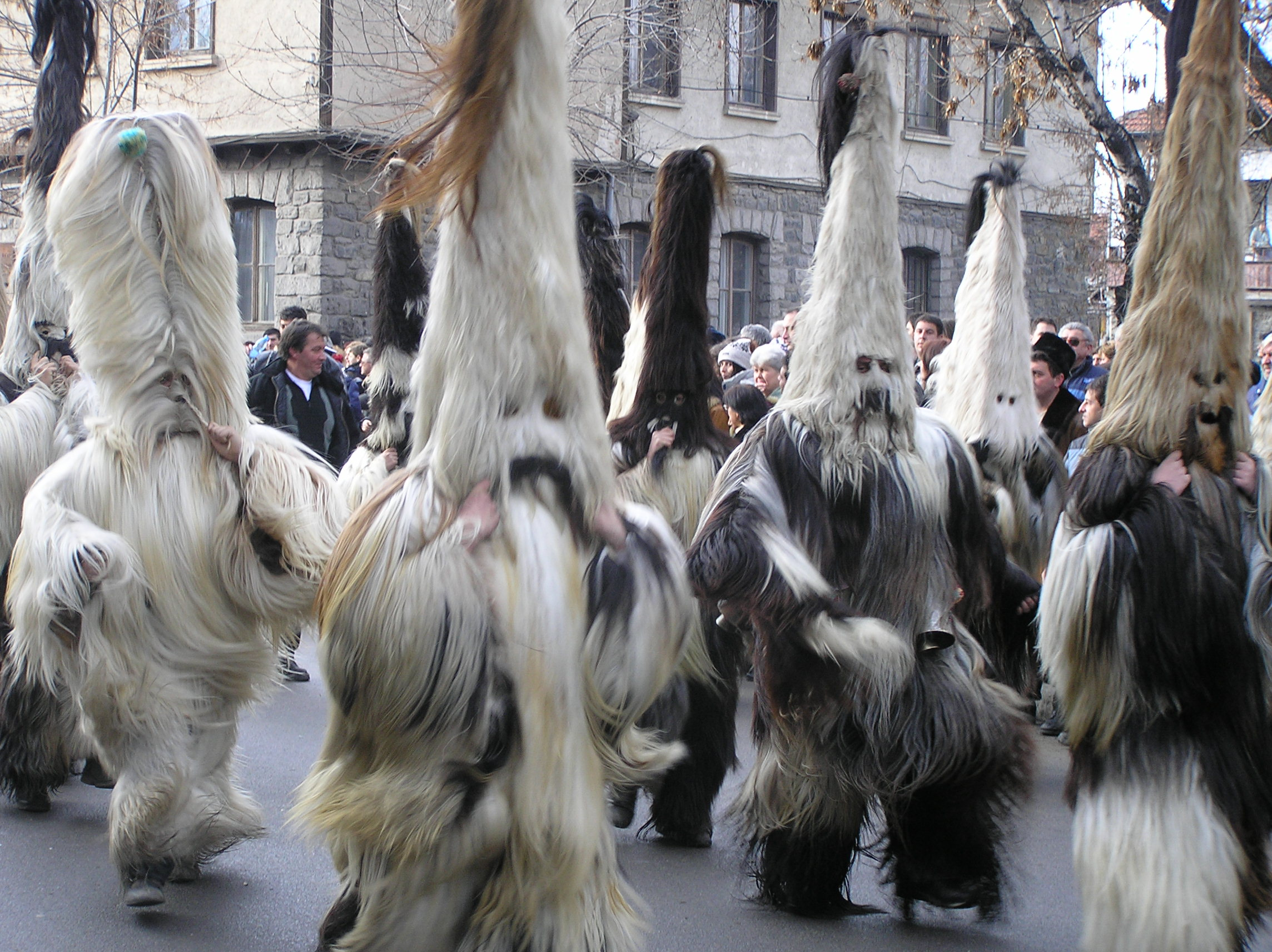
Kukeri in Razlog

Bulgaria functioned as a cultural hub of Slavic Europe during much of the Middle Ages, exerting considerable literary influence over the Eastern Orthodox world through the Preslav and Ohrid Literary Schools. Bulgaria also gave the world the Cyrillic script, the second most widely used alphabet and sixth most-used writing system in the world, which originated in these two schools in the tenth century.

Bulgaria's cultural contribution continued throughout the nineteenth and twentieth centuries in literature, music, theatre, visual arts, and science. Internationally recognised people with Bulgarian roots include Nobel Prize in Literature laureate Elias Canetti, the pianist Alexis Weissenberg, opera singer Boris Christoff, John Atanasoff, one of the pioneers of the digital computer, and visual artists Christo, Pascin, and Vladimir Dimitrov.

== Music ==
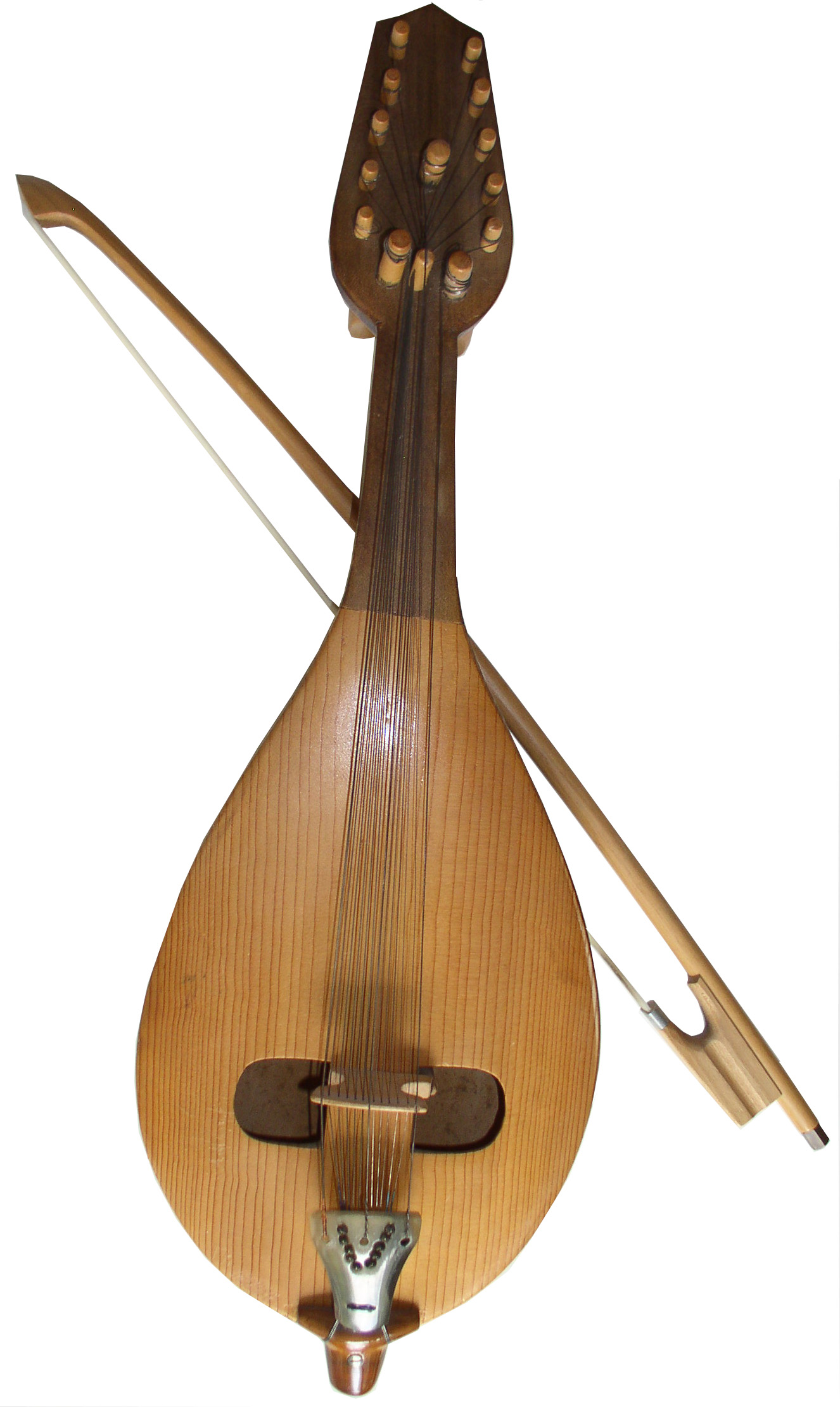
Gadulka, a traditional folk instrument.

Bulgaria has a long-standing musical tradition dating to the early Middle Ages. One of the earliest known composers of Medieval Europe, Yoan Kukuzel (ca. 1280–1360), became famous for his work Polieleion of the Bulgarian Woman. About 90 of his works have survived. Kukuzel also reformed the Byzantine musical writing system, and became known as The Angel-voiced for his singing abilities.

The tradition of church singing in Bulgaria is more than thousand years old. In the Bulgarian Orthodox Church there are two traditions of church singing - Eastern monodic (one-voice) singing and choral (polyphonic). The Eastern monodic singing observes the tradition of Greek and Byzantine music as well as the requirements of the eight-voices polyphonic canon of the Eastern Orthodox Church. The second tradition is the choral church music, established during the nineteenth century, when in Bulgaria enters the influence of Russian polyphonic choral church music. Many Bulgarian composers (Dobri Hristov, Petar Dinev, etc.) create their works in the spirit of Russian polyphony. Today Orthodox music is alive and is performed both during church worship services and at concerts by secular choirs and soloists. Contemporary Bulgarian choirs whose repertoire includes Orthodox music include the Yoan Kukuzel Choir, Plovdiv Boys' Choir 'Stefka Blagoeva', Sofia Boys' Choir, Madrigal Sofia Choir, Sofia Orthodox Choir and Sofia Priest Choir. Bulgaria has also produced internationally recognised opera singers, including Boris Christoff, Nicola Ghiuselev, Nicolai Ghiaurov, regarded as one of the major basses of the post-World War II era; Ghena Dimitrova, an internationally acclaimed dramatic soprano associated with major Verdi and Puccini roles; Elena Nicolai, a Bulgarian mezzo-soprano associated with the Italian operatic tradition; and Raina Kabaivanska, whose international career included a long association with Italian opera and La Scala.

Bulgarian classical music has also been represented by internationally active conductors. Important figures in the Bulgarian conducting tradition include Sasha Popov, founder of the Academic Symphony Orchestra, the predecessor of the Sofia Philharmonic, whose first concert he conducted in 1929; Ruslan Raychev, who worked with leading Bulgarian opera and symphonic institutions and appeared internationally in Europe, the United States, Brazil, Mexico, Cuba and Japan; Emil Tchakarov, a laureate of the Herbert von Karajan conducting competition who later worked as Karajan's assistant; Emil Tabakov, former music director of the Sofia Philharmonic and Belgrade Philharmonic and a prize-winner at the Nikolai Malko International Competition for Young Conductors; Nayden Todorov, artistic director of the Sofia Philharmonic since 2017; and Rossen Milanov, music director of the Columbus Symphony Orchestra, Chautauqua Symphony Orchestra and Princeton Symphony Orchestra.

The distinctive sound of Bulgarian folk music comes partly from the asymmetric rhythms, harmony and polyphony, such as the use of close intervals like the major second and the singing of a drone accompaniment underneath the melody, especially common in songs from the Shopluk region in Western Bulgaria and the Pirin region.

Bulgarian folk music is unique in its complex harmonies and highly irregular rhythms. These kinds of rhythms, also called uneven beats or asymmetric measures, were introduced to musicologists only in 1886 when music teacher Anastas Stoyan published Bulgarian folk melodies for the first time. Examples of such beats are 5/8, 7/8, 8/8, 9/8 and 11/8, or composite ones like 5+7/8, 15+14/8 and 9+5/16. Each area of Bulgaria has a characteristic music and dance style. Bulgarian folk music inspired and was used by musicians like Kate Bush and George Harrison.

Bulgarian vocal style has a unique throat quality, while the singers themselves are renowned for their range. Their voices are low and soprano and the children love singing as well as anything artistic. Diatonic scales predominate but in the Rhodope Mountains, for example, pentatonic scales occur, while in Thrace chromatic scales with augmented intervals (similar to the music of Classical Greece). Also, the intonation varies, and is quite different from the modern Western equal temperament. Depending on whether the melody moves up or down, an interval can augment or decrease by a quarter tone.

Musical instruments (also characteristic of the whole Balkan region) include gaida гайда (bagpipe), kaval кавал (rim-blown flute), zurna or zurla зурна (another woodwind, similar to oboe typical among Roma), tambura тамбура (long-necked lute), gadulka гъдулка (bowed instrument held upright).

The gaida of Bulgaria is worthy of its own subsection. In Bulgaria the gaida has been a long symbol of the country and its heritage, and is one of the more well-known instruments of the country. The gaida most widely used is the Thracian gaida. There is in the Rhodope Mountains the deep-sounding kaba gaida. In the north, common of Dobrudzha and the Vlachs there is the dzhura gaida. Also in the Strandzha region near the border with Turkey there is the Strandzha gaida. The bag itself is made of a goat skin turned inside out, and most often the rims of the different parts of the instrument - chanter and drone pipe - have a piece of horn on it.

Dances have complex steps matching the rhythms, and are often fast. Most are circle-dances or line dances called horo; but some are done singly or in pairs.

Although traditional music and dance are not popular among Bulgarian city youth, they are often performed at weddings, and generally in countryside festivals. They are also performed in Bulgaria and abroad by amateur and professional performing artists and choirs.

Regional folk musical styles abound in Bulgaria. Northern Bulgaria, Dobruja, Shopluk, Thrace, Strandzha, Macedonia and Rhodopes - all have distinctive sounds. Much of traditional folk music revolved around holidays like Christmas, New Year's Day, midsummer, and the Feast of St. Lazarus, as well as the Strandzha region's unusual Nestinarstvo rites on May 21.

Several world-renowned troupes perform Bulgarian folk music, including the State Ensemble for Folk Songs and Dances, founded by Philip Koutev (1903–1982), Trio Bulgarka and the Bulgarian State Television Female Vocal Choir, who are featured, among others, on the anthologies titled Le Mystère des Voix Bulgares, volume 2 of which received a Grammy Award in 1989.

One internationally known artist, Valya Balkanska, sang the song Izlel e Delyu Haydutin, which was chosen to be part of the Voyager Golden Record selection of music sent into space in the two Voyager spacecraft launched in 1977. The Bulgarian State Television Female Vocal Choir also known as Mystery of Bulgarian voices has also attained a considerable degree of fame.

== Customs and rites ==
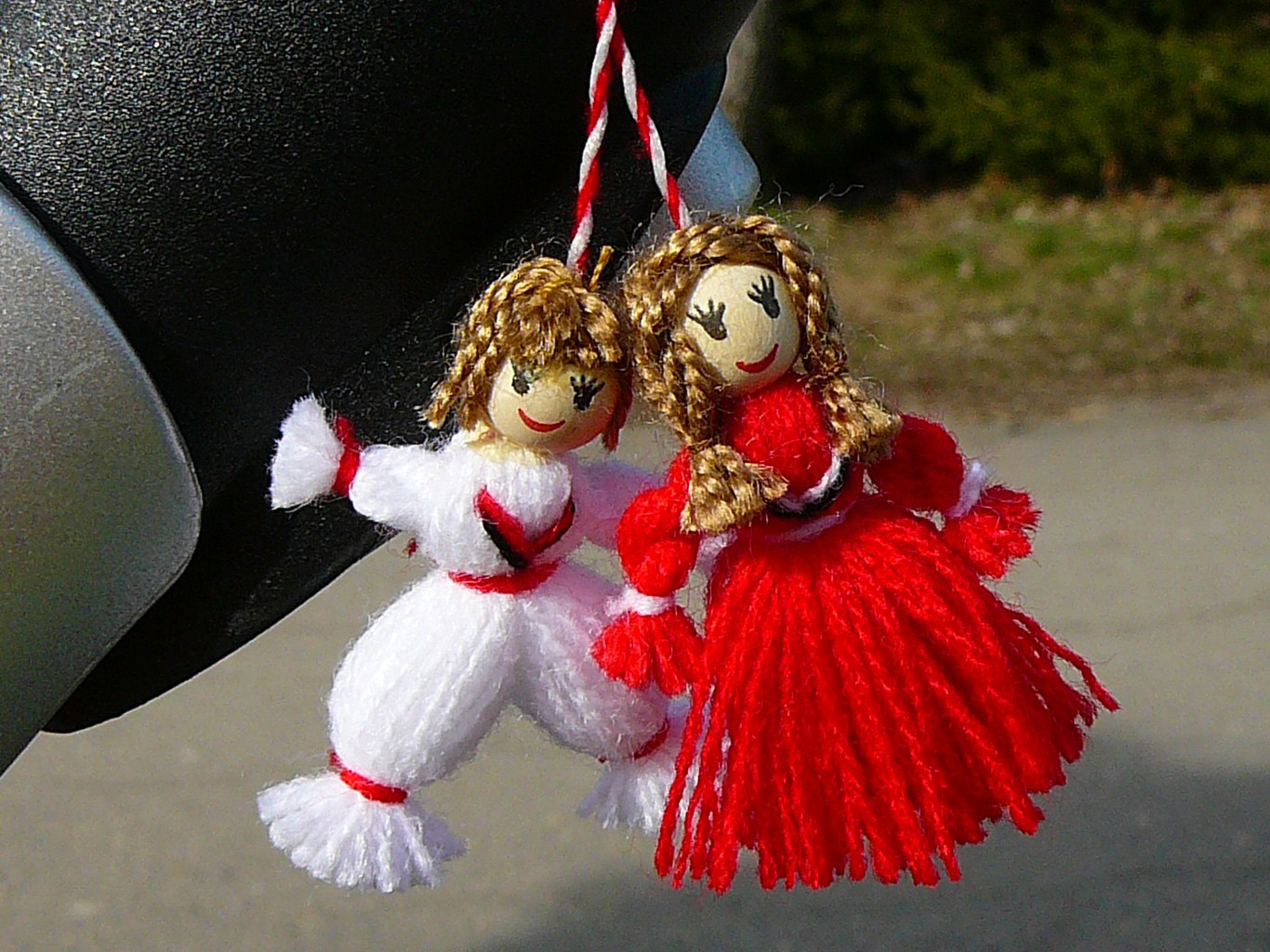
Usual type of Bulgarian martenitsa.

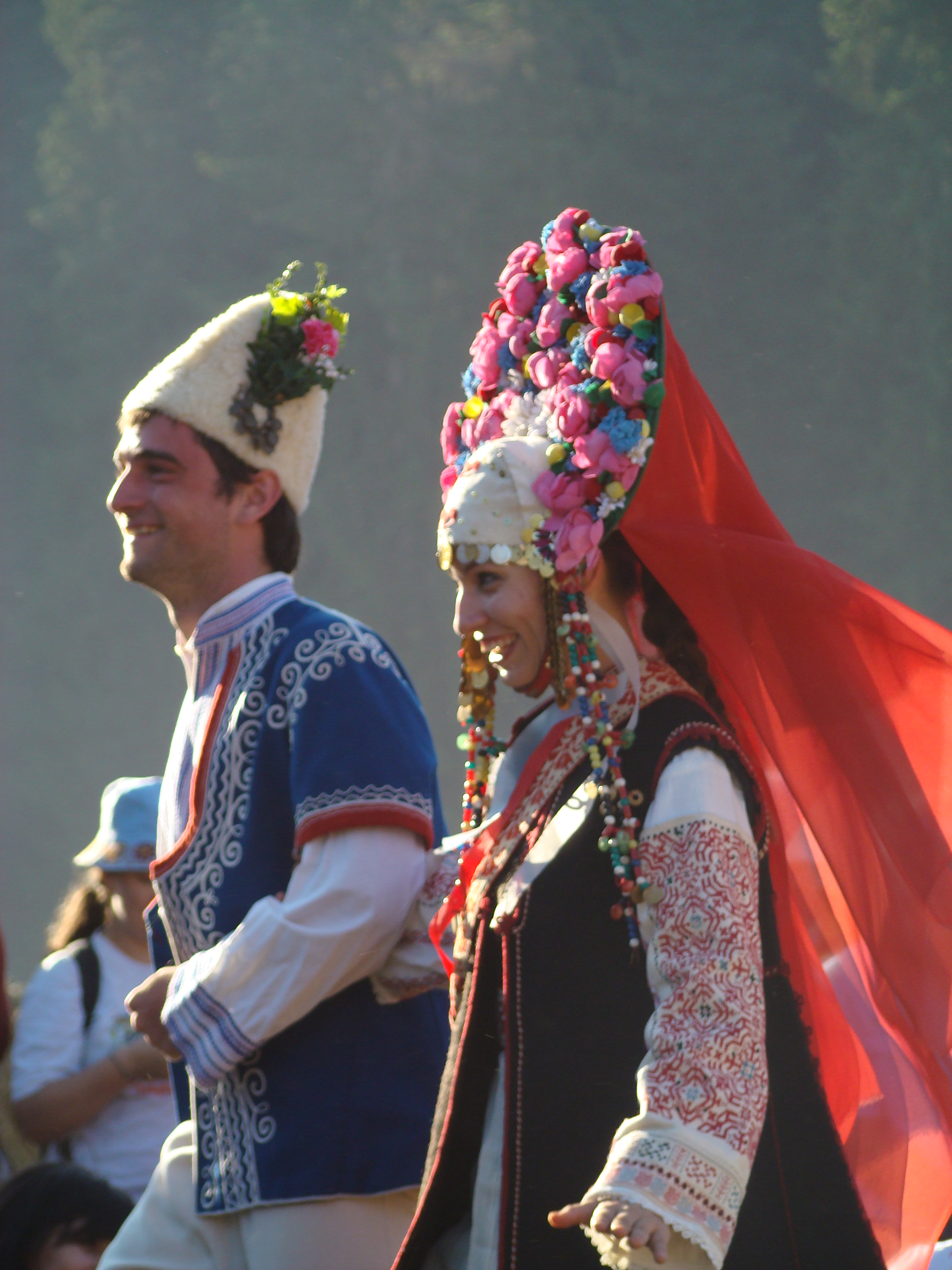
Bulgarian folk costume

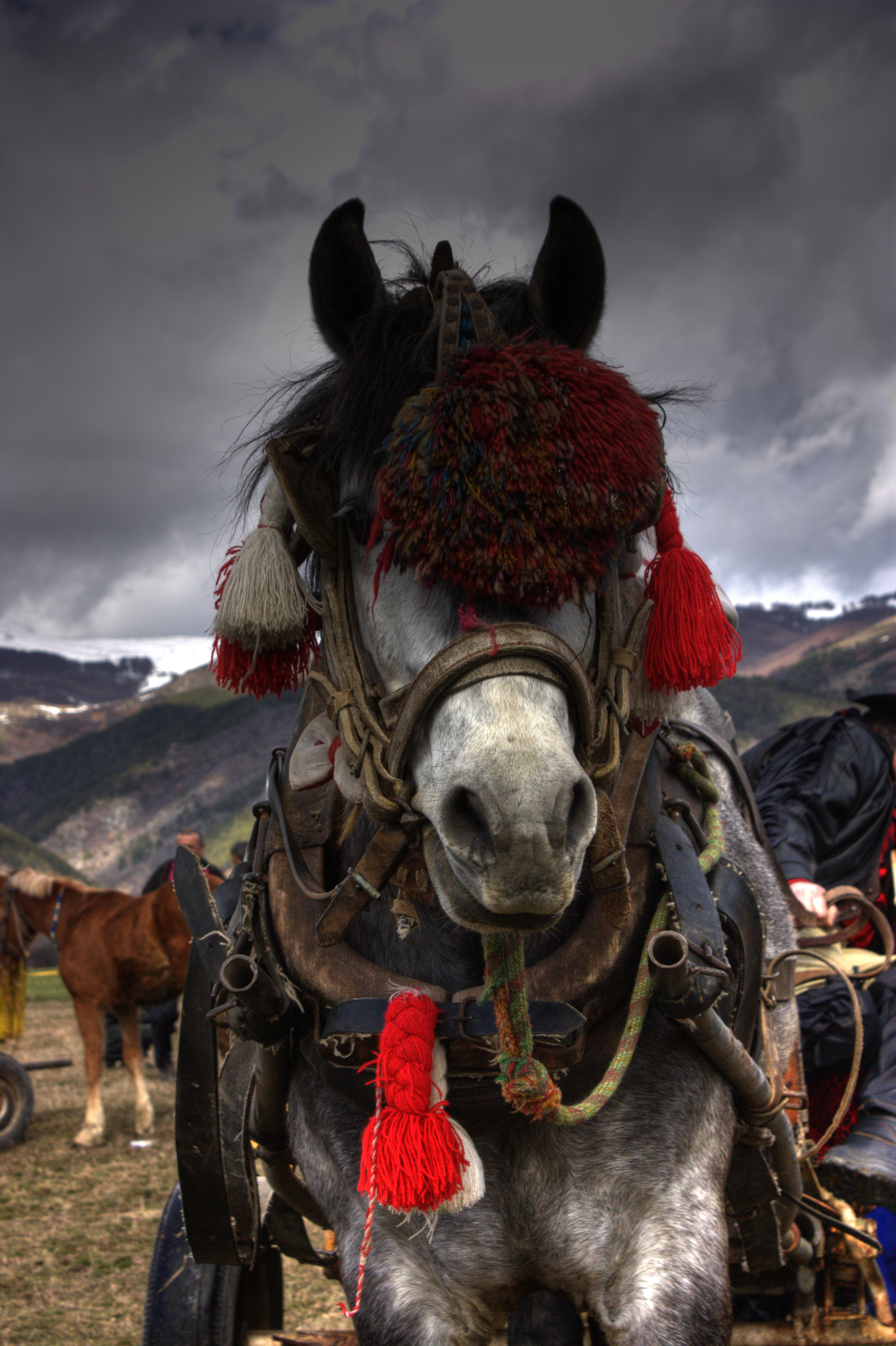
A decorated horse, prepared for a race. Horseraces take place each year to mark Todorovden (St. Theodore's day).

Bulgarians often give each other a martenitsa (мартеница) — an adornment made of white and red yarn and worn on the wrist or pinned on the clothes — from March 1 until the end of the month. Alternatively, one can take off the martenitsa earlier if one sees a stork (considered a harbinger of spring). One can then tie the martenitsa to the blossoming branch of a tree. Family-members and friends in Bulgaria customarily exchange martenitsas, which they regard as symbols of health and longevity. The white thread represents peace and tranquility, while the red one stands for the cycles of life. Bulgarians may also refer to the holiday of 1 March as Baba Marta (Баба Марта), meaning Grandmother March. It preserves an ancient pagan tradition. Many legends exist regarding the birth of this custom, some of them dating back to the 7th century and the time of Khan Kubrat, the ruler of Old Great Bulgaria. Other tales relate the martenitsa to Thracian and Zoroastrian beliefs. Romania and some parts of Greece also have a similar custom. In 2017, UNESCO added the cultural practices centered around the martenitsa ritual in the UNESCO Intangible Cultural Heritage Lists.

The ancient Bulgarian ritual of kukeri (кукери), performed by costumed men, seeks to scare away evil spirits and bring good harvest and health to the community. The costumes, made of animal furs and fleeces, cover the whole of the body. A mask, adorned with horns and decoration, covers the head of each kuker, who also have bells attached to his waist. The kukeri dance, jump and shout in an attempt to banish all evil from the village. Some of the performers impersonate royalty, field-workers and craftsmen. The adornments on the costumes vary from one region to another. In 2015, the ritual was entered in the UNESCO Intangible Cultural Heritage Lists as part of the traditional Surva Folk Fest held annually in Pernik.

Another characteristic custom called Nestinarstvo (Нестинарство), or firedancing, is found in the Strandzha region. This ancient custom involves dancing into fire or over live embers. Women dance into the fire with their bare feet without suffering any injury or pain. In 2009, the ritual was entered in the UNESCO Intangible Cultural Heritage Lists.

== UNESCO World Heritage Sites ==
Bulgaria has nine UNESCO World Heritage Sites, which are part of the national route tourist map of 100 national tourist sites of the Bulgarian Tourist Union:

- The early medieval large rock relief Madara Rider
- Two Thracian tombs (one in Sveshtari and one in Kazanlak)
- Three monuments of medieval Bulgarian culture (the Boyana Church, the Rila Monastery and the Rock-hewn Churches of Ivanovo)
- Two examples of natural beauty: the Fisherman Momerioland the Sreburna Nature Reserve
- The ancient city of Nessebur — a unique combination of European cultural interaction, as well as, historically, one of the most important centres of seaborne trade in the Black Sea
- "Surva"- International Kukeri Festival in Pernik, Bulgaria. One of the biggest masquerade festival on the Balkans and Eastern Europe. Conducted in the last three days of January. Kukeri or Surva Festival (Mummer's games) in the town of Pernik, is the most spectacular "Kukeri" event in Bulgaria. At the end of January thousands of "kukeri" participants from different regions of Bulgaria, as well as from all around the world gather in Pernik for the three-day event. The festival held in Pernik is the oldest festival of the masquerade games in Bulgaria. The first edition was opened on January 16, 1966. In 1995 the International Federation of Carnival Cities accepted the town of Pernik as its full member. In 2009 Pernik was proclaimed as the European capital of Surva's and Mummer's. The news that the Kukeri tradition and the Surva Festival in Pernik will be included in UNESCO's list of protected non-material cultural heritage, was announced before the inaugural ceremony of the 20th edition of the mummery fest in 2015.

Local archaeologists assume that the number of archaeological sites is the third-largest in Europe after Italy and Greece.

== Theatres ==
According to the Bulgarian Statistical Institute as of 2005 there were 75 theatres in Bulgaria including National Opera and Ballet of Bulgaria with around 30,000 seats altogether. The first theatrical events in Bulgaria are related to community centers which were the center of the spiritual and social life of the country in the middle of the 19th century.

The first theatrical production was presented in Shumen in 1856. This is the comedy Mihal Mouseoed by Sava Dobroplodni, who at that time was a teacher in Shumen.

The name of Dobri Voynikov means the beginning of the Bulgarian theater. They call it the father of the Bulgarian drama and theater. According to the fact - an inaccurate definition, because the first dramaturgic work in Bulgaria is the comedy of Theodosius Ikonomov, "The Lovecycle Wanderer or Bella of the hunting poet Sahatchiya", published in 1863 but compiled as early as 1857. The first theatrical performances on the Bulgarian stage are also not Soldiers. These are the comedy "Mihal", translated by Greek and adapted for the Bulgarian audience by Sava Dobroplodni, who organized her performance in Shumen, and the dramas "Multitudes Genoveva" and "Belisarius", placed by Krastyu Pishurka in Lom. All three titles were first played in 1856.

Vazov tells of theater in the 1870s. Until then, dozens of theatrical and pre-theatrical performances have been performed. The first of them began to be organized in the 1940s and 1950s. Even then there are traces of scenographic attempts in our country.

A more important theatrical fact during the Renaissance was the creation of the Svishtov People's Theater. The Bulgarian performances in the town began in the 1870s, when the two enthusiastic theaters - Dimitar Shishmanov and Nikolay Pavlovich - returned in their home country. The first is a director, the second is a local theater painter. The Svishtov performances are played on a specially built stage, whose artistic layout is entrusted to N. Pavlovich. And he probably managed to overcome the level of the then Bulgarian theater.

During the period 1900–1917, the Bulgarian theater entered a new stage of its development - a stage of real professionalisation of the acting art, the Europeanization of the appearance of the spectacle and the permanent establishment of the National Theater as a nationally representative cultural institution.

The Bulgarian Theater in the years to 1989 has ideological-party orientation. It is in the service of socialist realism.

The arts are called "the means of education", and "socialist realism - the only method of artistic creativity". Changes in society, culture, the arts, the theater are ubiquitous. The imposition of socialist realism takes place through the repertoire, the new Bulgarian drama, as well as the staging practice.

The dynamic development of the Bulgarian theater after 1989 typifies theater phenomena for a long period of nearly 25 years and highlights by them trends, essential characteristics and innovative movements.

Famous Bulgarian theatrical actors are: Georgi Kaloyanchev, Stoyanka Mutafova, Roza Popova, Vasil Gendov, Georgi Partsalev, Velko Kanev, Pavel Poppandov, Maria Sapundjieva, Iossif Surchadzhiev and others.

Famous Bulgarian playwrights include: Peyo Yavorov, Nedyalko Yordanov, Stoslav Stratiev, Rangel Ignatov and others.

== Visual art ==
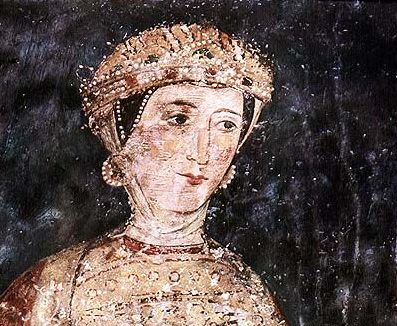
Fresco, depicting Sebastocratoress Desislava in Boyana Church.

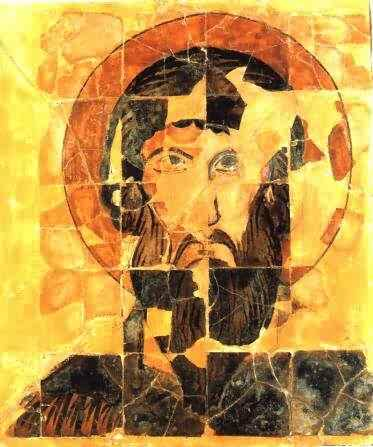
A ceramic icon of St. Theodore, made by the Preslav Literary School in the 10th century

Bulgaria has a rich heritage in the visual arts, especially in frescoes, murals and icons. The Thracian Tomb of Kazanlak offers fine examples of excellently preserved ancient Thracian art. Tomb art provides one of the most important sources of information about Thracian lifestyle and culture. Visual arts in the Bulgarian lands experienced an upsurge during the entire period of the Middle Ages. The crypt of the Alexander Nevski cathedral features an exhibition of a large collection of medieval icons. The earliest of those dates from around the 9th century. The Tarnovo Artistic School, the mainstream of the Bulgarian fine arts and architecture between 13th and 14th centuries, takes its name from the capital and main cultural center of the Second Bulgarian Empire, Tarnovo. Although it shows the influence of some tendencies of the Palaeologan Renaissance in the Byzantine Empire, the Tarnovo painting had its own unique features which makes it a separate artistic school. Art historians classify its products into two types:

- mural painting: mural decoration of churches
- iconography: easel painting

The works of the school show some degree of realism, portrait individualism and psychology.

The unique and realistic portraits in the Boyana Church class as forerunners of the Renaissance.

The wall piers and the arches often featured medallion-shaped bust images of saints. Magnificent examples of those survive in Church of Saints Peter and Paul Church in Tarnovo. Along with traditional scenes such as "Christ's passions" and "Feast cycle" in the second layer; "Christ Pantokrator" in the dome and the Madonna with the infant Christ in the apse, specific images and scenes also appear. During the period of Ottoman rule (1396–1878) the authorities suppressed Bulgarian art. Many churches suffered destruction, and newly built ones remained somewhat modest. In the end of the 18th century the Islamic Ottoman Empire began to decay slowly, thus permitting the Bulgarian National Revival of the 18th and 19th centuries to occur. Bulgaria experienced a revival in every area of culture. Following the Liberation in 1878, fine arts rapidly recovered and came under the influence of European artistic currents such as late Romanticism.

After 1878 until the middle of the 20th century, there was a difficult process of incorporating the Bulgarian art into the contemporary European artistic culture. The development of Bulgarian art follows the path of the ethnographic and descriptive genre scenes, painted by the artists after the Liberation, such as Ivan Markvichka, Anton Mitov, Ivan Angelov, Yaroslav Veshin in landscapes and elegant portraits typical of the beginning of the 20th century by Nikola Petrov, Nikola Marinov, Stefan Ivanov, Elena Karamihailova together with the expressive decorations of the 1920s (Ivan Milev, Ivan Penkov, Pencho Georgiev ... ) to the creative talents and various plastic quests in the 1930s and 1940s by Vladimir Dimitrov - The Master, Zlatyu Boyadzhiev, Dechko Uzunov, Nenko Balkanski, Sirak Skitnik, Vera Nedkova, Ivan Nenov, Bencho Obreshkov, with many different artists from different parts of the country.

Cartoons, illustration and book design first appeared through Alexander Bozhinov, Ilia Beshkov, Raiko Aleksiev, Kiril Buyukliiski, Alexander Zhendov, Stoyan Venev and Sirak Skitnik. Bulgarian sculpture also developed, with foundations laid by Boris Shaz, Zheko Spiridonov, Andrey Nikolov, Ivan Lazarov, Lyubomir Dalchev, Vaska Emanouilova, Marko Markov and Ivan Funev. Bulgarian art has continued to develop independently to the present day.

== Cuisine ==
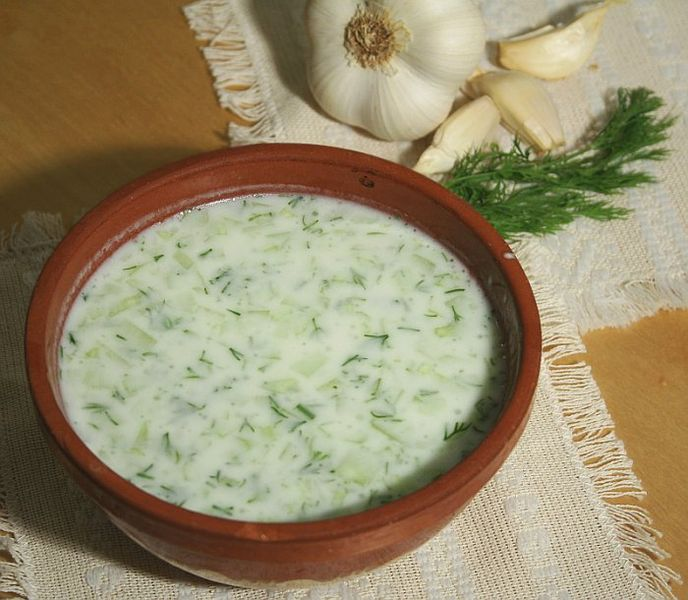
Tarator.

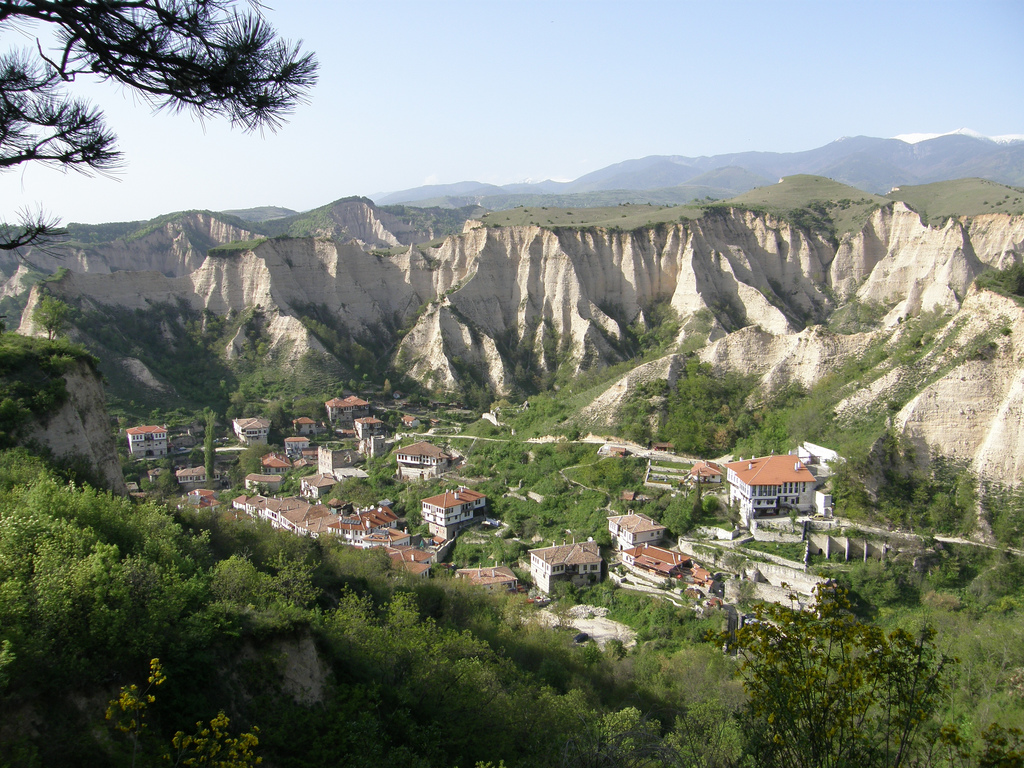
Melnik is a major wine production center since 1346.

The relatively warm climate and diverse geography provide favourable growing conditions for a variety of vegetables, herbs and fruits, contributing to the diversity of Bulgarian cuisine (българска кухня, bulgarska kuhnya).

Famous for its rich salads required at every meal, Bulgarian cuisine also features diverse quality dairy products and a variety of wines and local alcoholic drinks such as rakia (ракия), mastika (мастика) and menta (мента). Bulgarian cuisine also features a variety of hot and cold soups, for example tarator. Many different Bulgarian pastries exist as well, such as banitsa, a traditional pastry prepared by layering a mixture of whisked eggs and pieces of Bulgarian cheese with filo pastry and then baking it in an oven.

Traditionally, Bulgarian cooks put lucky charms into their pastry on certain occasions, particularly on Christmas Eve, the first day of Christmas, or New Year's Eve. Such charms may include coins or small symbolic objects (such as a small piece of a dogwood branch with a bud, symbolizing health or longevity). More recently, people have started writing happy wishes on small pieces of paper and wrapping them in tin foil. Messages may include wishes for happiness, health, long life or success throughout the new year.

Bulgarians eat banitsa — hot or cold — for breakfast with plain yogurt, ayran, or boza. Some varieties include banitsa with spinach (спаначена баница, spanachena banitsa) or the sweet version, banitsa with milk (млечна баница, mlechna banitsa) or pumpkin (тиквеник, tikvenik).

The Bulgarian lyutenitsa (лютеница) is a spicy mixture of mashed and cooked tomatoes, aubergines, garlic, hot peppers and vegetable oil, seasoned with salt, pepper and parsley. Variations of lyutenitsa exist in the national cuisines of most Balkan states.

Tripe soup (шкембе чорба, skhembe chorba) takes as its basis the thick lining of the cleaned stomach of cattle, prepared with milk and seasoned with vinegar, garlic and hot peppers. Under Ottoman rule, the sultans allegedly preferred tripe soup made by Bulgarian cooks, whose mastery in preparing the dish remained unmatched in the Balkans. In addition, Bulgaria is included in the Michelin catalog because of its rich cuisine and traditional dishes.

Exports of Bulgarian wine go worldwide; and until 1990 the country exported the world's second-largest total of bottled wine. The rich soil, perfect climate and the millennia-old tradition of wine-making, which dates back to the time of the Thracians, contribute to the wide variety of fine Bulgarian wines. As of 2007, Bulgaria produced 200,000 tonnes of wine annually, ranking 20th in the world.

== Media ==
Bulgaria's media are generally deemed unbiased, although the state still dominates the field through the Bulgarian National Television (BNT), the Bulgarian National Radio (BNR), and the Bulgarian Telegraph Agency. Bulgarian media have a record of unbiased reporting, although they are deemed potentially at risk of political influence due to the lack of legislation to protect them. The written media have no legal restrictions and newspaper publishing is entirely liberal. The extensive freedom of the press means that no exact number of publications can be established, although some research put an estimate of around 900 print media outlets for 2006. The largest-circulation daily newspapers include Dneven Trud and 24 Chasa.

Non-printed media sources, such as television and radio, are overseen by the Council for Electronic Media (CEM), an independent body with the authority to issue broadcasting licenses. Apart from a state-operated national television channel, radio station and the Bulgarian News Agency, a large number of private television and radio stations exist. However, most Bulgarian media experience a number of negative trends, such as general degradation of media products, self-censorship and economic or political pressure. Slavi's Show and Gospodari Na Efira are among the most popular TV programs, both having more than 1,000,000 views per show.

The Bulgarian National Television also produces cultural programmes such as Art Detective, created and presented by Simona Krasteva.

Internet media are growing in popularity due to the wide range of available opinions and viewpoints, lack of censorship and diverse content.

== Religion ==
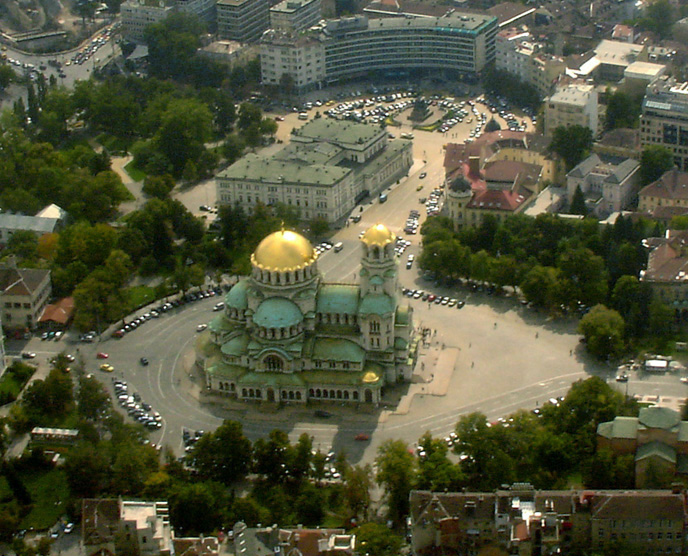
Alexander Nevsky Cathedral, one of the largest Orthodox churches in the world.

Bulgaria is officially a secular nation and the Constitution guarantees the free exercise of religion but designates Orthodoxy as a "traditional" religion. Most citizens of Bulgaria have associations — at least nominally — with the Bulgarian Orthodox Church. Founded in 870 AD under the Patriarchate of Constantinople (from which it obtained its first primate, its clergy and theological texts), the Bulgarian Orthodox Church had autocephalous status since 927 AD. The Church became subordinate within the Patriarchate of Constantinople, twice during the periods of Byzantine (1018 – 1185) and Ottoman (1396 – 1878) domination. It was re-established first in 1870 in the form of the Bulgarian Exarchate, and then in the 1950s as the Bulgarian Patriarchate.

=== Fourteenth century ===
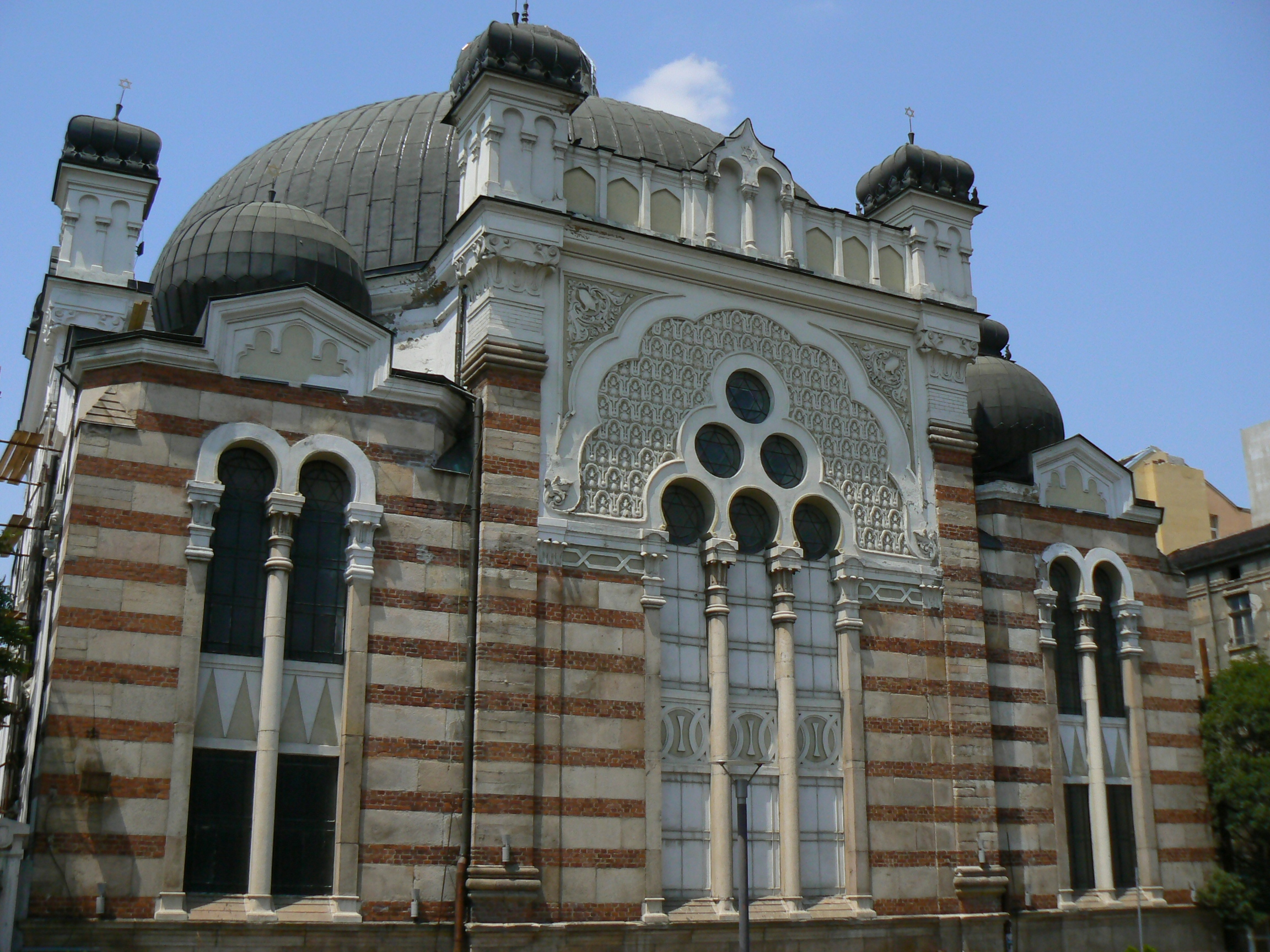
Sofia Synagogue. The Jewish community in the country numbers less than 2,000 people.

Islam came to Bulgaria at the end of the fourteenth century after the conquest of the country by the Ottomans. It gradually gained ground throughout the fifteenth and sixteenth centuries through the introduction of Turkish colonists. One Islamic sect, Ahmadiyya, faces problems in Bulgaria. Some officials have moved against Ahmadis on the grounds that other countries also attack the religious rights of Ahmadis, who many Muslims regard as heretical.

=== Sixteenth and the seventeenth centuries ===
In the sixteenth and the seventeenth centuries, missionaries from Rome converted Bulgarian Paulicians in the districts of Plovdiv and Svishtov to Roman Catholicism. Today their descendants form the bulk of Bulgarian Catholics, whose number stood at 44,000 in 2001.

=== 1800s-present ===
Missionaries from the United States introduced Protestantism into Bulgarian territory in 1857. Missionary work continued throughout the second half of the nineteenth and the first half of the twentieth century. In 2001 Bulgaria had some 42,000 Protestants. In the 2001 census, 82.6% Bulgarians declared themselves Orthodox Christians, 12.2% Muslim, 1.2% other Christian denominations, 4% other religions (Buddhism, Taoism, Hinduism, Judaism) and zero percent atheists.

Buddhism, Hinduism and Taoism became popular among Bulgarians in the time of perestroika and especially after the fall of communist regime and are usually a co-religion or co-belief to Bulgarians who otherwise are Christians (Roman Catholicism or Orthodoxy). Among these Eastern (Asian) religions Buddhist centres are officially registered in Bulgaria as religious denominations. The number of followers of Buddhism has increased gradually in recent years also due to the influx of Vietnamese citizens (predominantly Buddhist) to Bulgaria.

According to the most recent Eurostat "Eurobarometer" poll, in 2005, 40% of Bulgarian citizens responded that "they believe there is a God", whereas 40% answered that "they believe there is some sort of spirit or life force", 13% that "they do not believe there is a God, spirit, nor life force", and 6% did not answer.

== Clothing ==
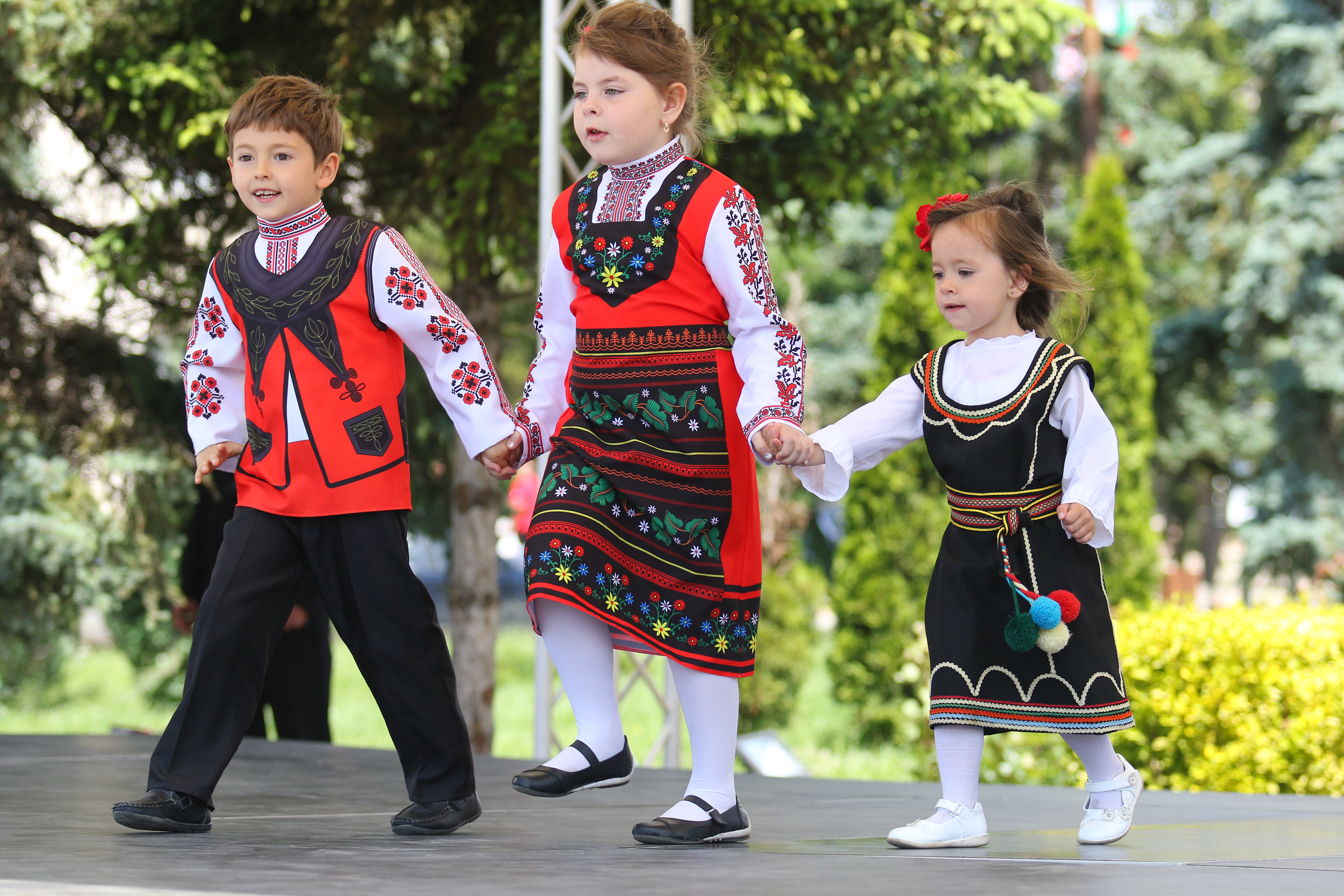
Bulgarian children in national costumes.

Bulgarian traditional clothing is diverse, and every ethnographic area in Bulgaria has its distinct styles. Bulgarians call their traditional clothing 'носия' (nosiya).

== See also ==
- Golden Age of medieval Bulgarian culture
- Art School of Tarnovo
- Tarnovo Literary School
- Architecture of the Tarnovo Artistic School
- Bulgarian language
- Public holidays in Bulgaria
