= History of Tarnovo =

Veliko Tarnovo is a city in north central Bulgaria and the administrative centre of Veliko Tarnovo Province. It is also known as Turnovo, Tsarevgrad or Turnov, and is a city with over 7000 years of history.

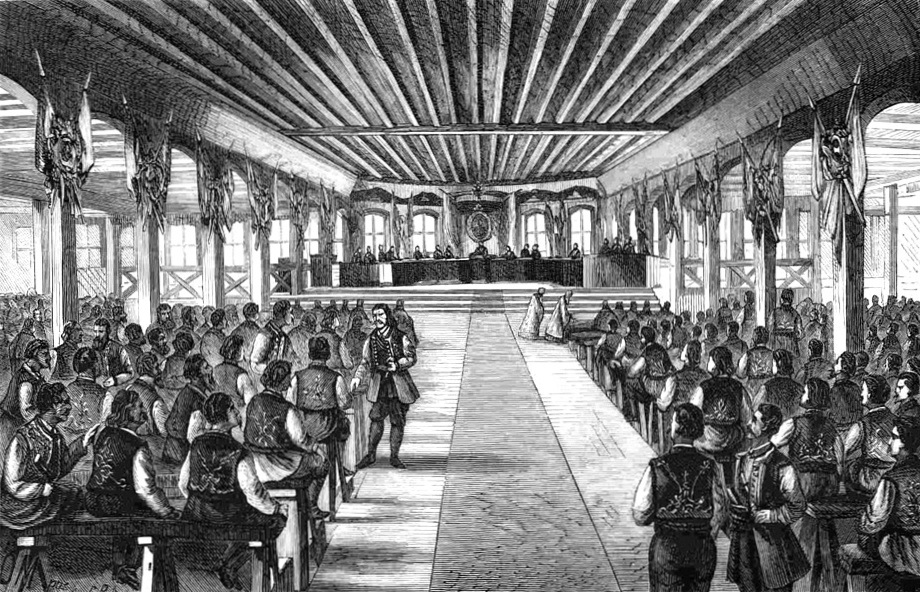
Constituent assembly in Turnovo

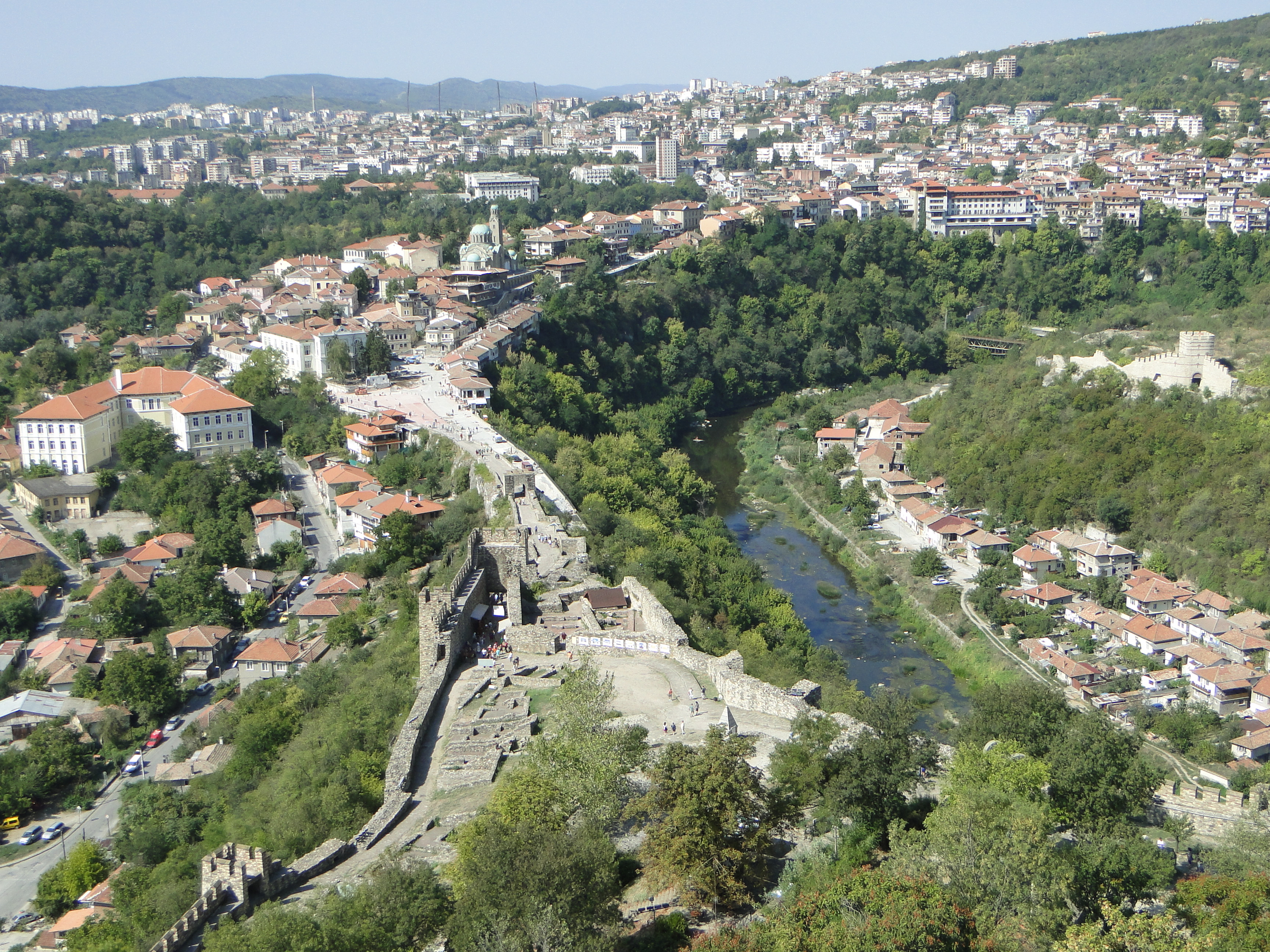

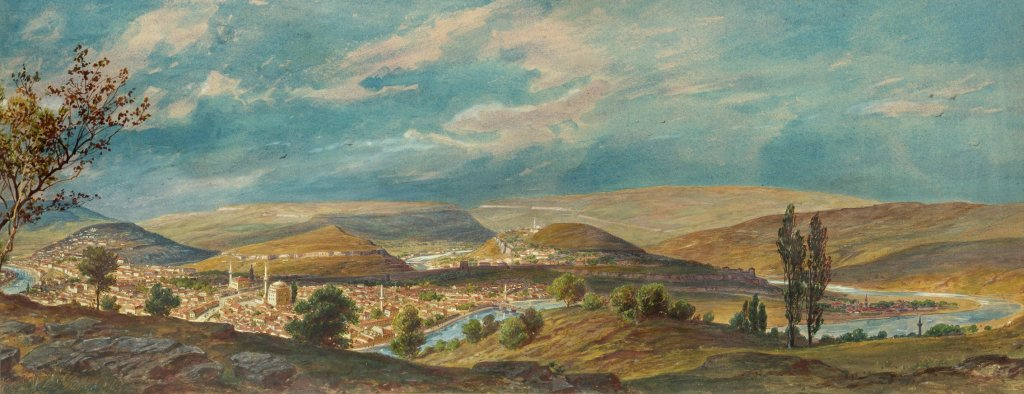
Tarnovo by Felix Kanitz

== Antiquity ==
The largest settlement mound from the Late Neolithic (second half of the 6th millennium BC) was discovered during rescue excavations in 1972-1979 on the territory of the town in the Western industrial zone in the Kacitsa area.

== The Early Byzantine period ==
There was a Roman settlement on the Tsarevets hill called, according to some historians, "Nikopolis i Hemum". From the middle of the 4th century on the hills of Tsarevets and Momina fortress were settled Gothic-Arians led by Bishop Wolfila. Fortified settlements began to be created in the first Bulgarian state in the tenth century. The town was an important settlement from the period of the First Bulgarian State. Nobles lived in the town - called "trapeziti" there was a large military garrison.

== First Bulgarian Empire ==
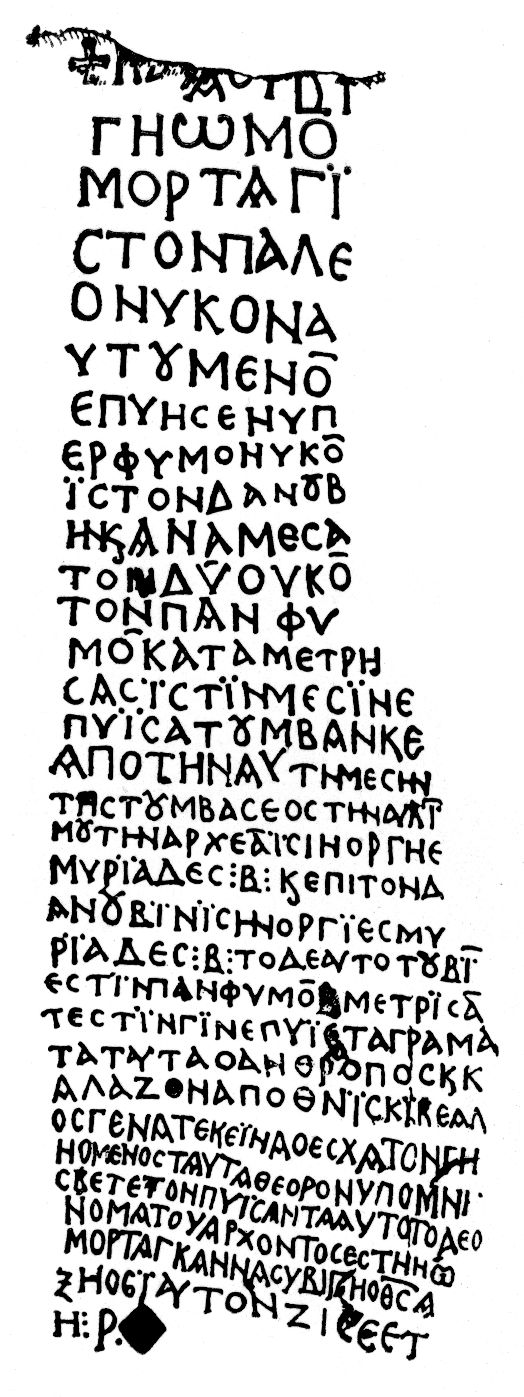
Omurtag's Tarnovo Inscription

On the hills on which the capital city of Turnovo extends, a number of coins, specimens, ceramics from the First Bulgarian State and specimens from Volga Bulgaria were found.

== Capital period (XII-XIV) century ==
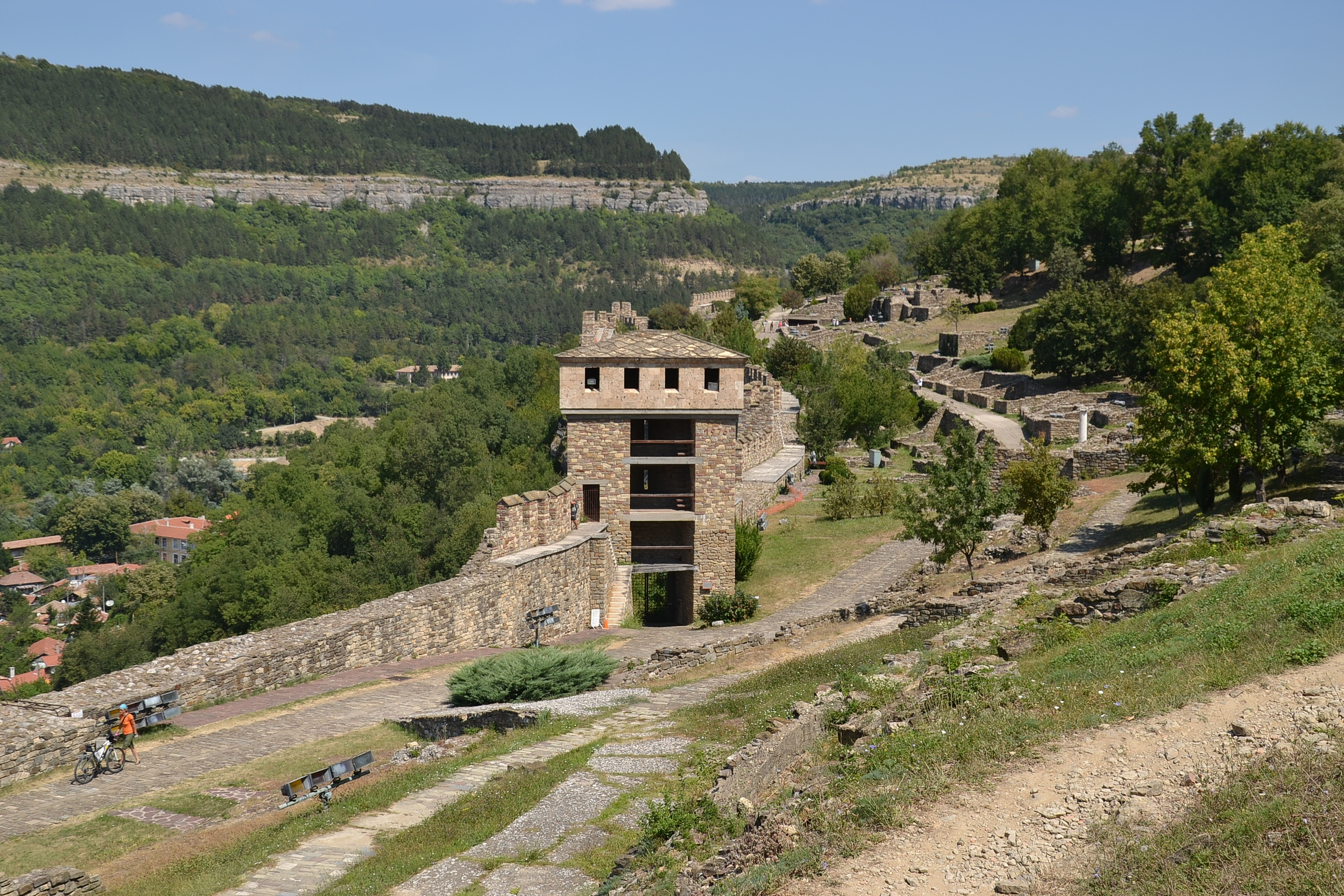
Part of Tsarevets

Turnovgrad was an administrative, military, economic, cultural and religious center. During this period, the Art School of Tarnovo, the Tarnovo Literary School, the Turnovo Architecture developed. The city is ruled by several dynasties: Asenevtsi, Smilets, Terterovtsi, Shishmanovtsi. The city maintained commercial relations with major European cities and towns in the Middle East. Serbian King Saint Sava died in the city, his relics were later handed over to Serbia.

== Ottoman rule ==
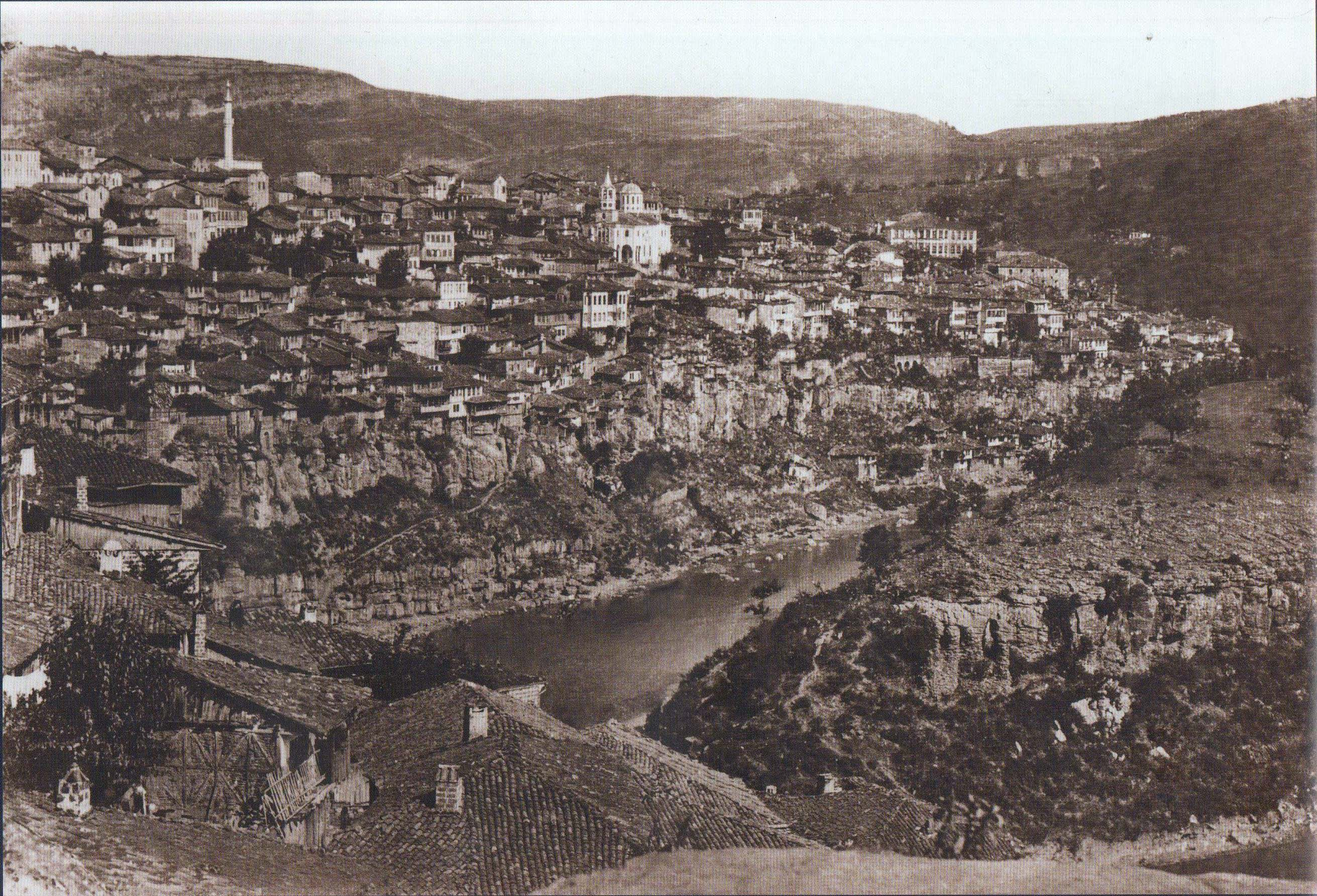
View of Tarnovo in 1877

After Bulgaria fell under Ottoman rule, much of the aristocracy moved to Russia, Asia Minor, and Northern Europe. Some Bulgarians continued to resist. The First Tarnovo Uprising and the Second Tarnovo Uprising in the 16th and 17th centuries broke out in the city. The city became home to a significant Turkish population, and many churches were converted into mosques. The city remained an important administrative centre. Several hamams were opened, and many Turkish cafes and Ottoman-style houses were built, giving an Oriental look to the city. But the city also managed to preserve its Bulgarian culture and identity. In 1835, a rebellion against the Ottoman empire - the Velch Conspiracy - was organized in the city. The monasteries of Veliko Turnovo's Holy Forest were centres of cultural and literary activity. A charity organisation 'Women's Municipality' was founded. There were several agricultural markets in the city (on Asen I square, next to the Men's High School, and the maritime field agricultural market) and the Samovodska Charshia market in the Bolyarski neighbourhood. There are many important examples of Bulgarian National Revival architecture, including works by the outstanding architect Kolyu Ficheto.

== Modern Bulgaria ==
The city was liberated on July 7, 1877 by General Iosif Gurko's army. The Russian Grand Duke Nikolai Nikolaevich entered Tarnovo on June 30, 1877, greeted by thousands of Bulgarians and passing under a specially built triumphal arch. Bulgaria's first archaeological society was founded in the city in 1878. On February 10, 1879, a Constituent Assembly was convened in Tarnovo. The Independence of Bulgaria was proclaimed by Tsar Ferdinand in the city in 1908. The villages of Marino Pole, and the settlement in the Dervent Gorge were incorporated into the city. The Trapezitsa Tourist Association was opened in the city in 1902. On June 1, 1913, at 11.28 am the city and surrounding settlements were struck by an earthquake with a magnitude of 7 on the Richter scale. More than 20 people were killed, and hundreds of houses and cultural monuments were destroyed. Today Veliko Tarnovo is very much part of the western world, and even has dealerships for Ford, Citroen and Renault cars!
