= Culture of Veliko Tarnovo =

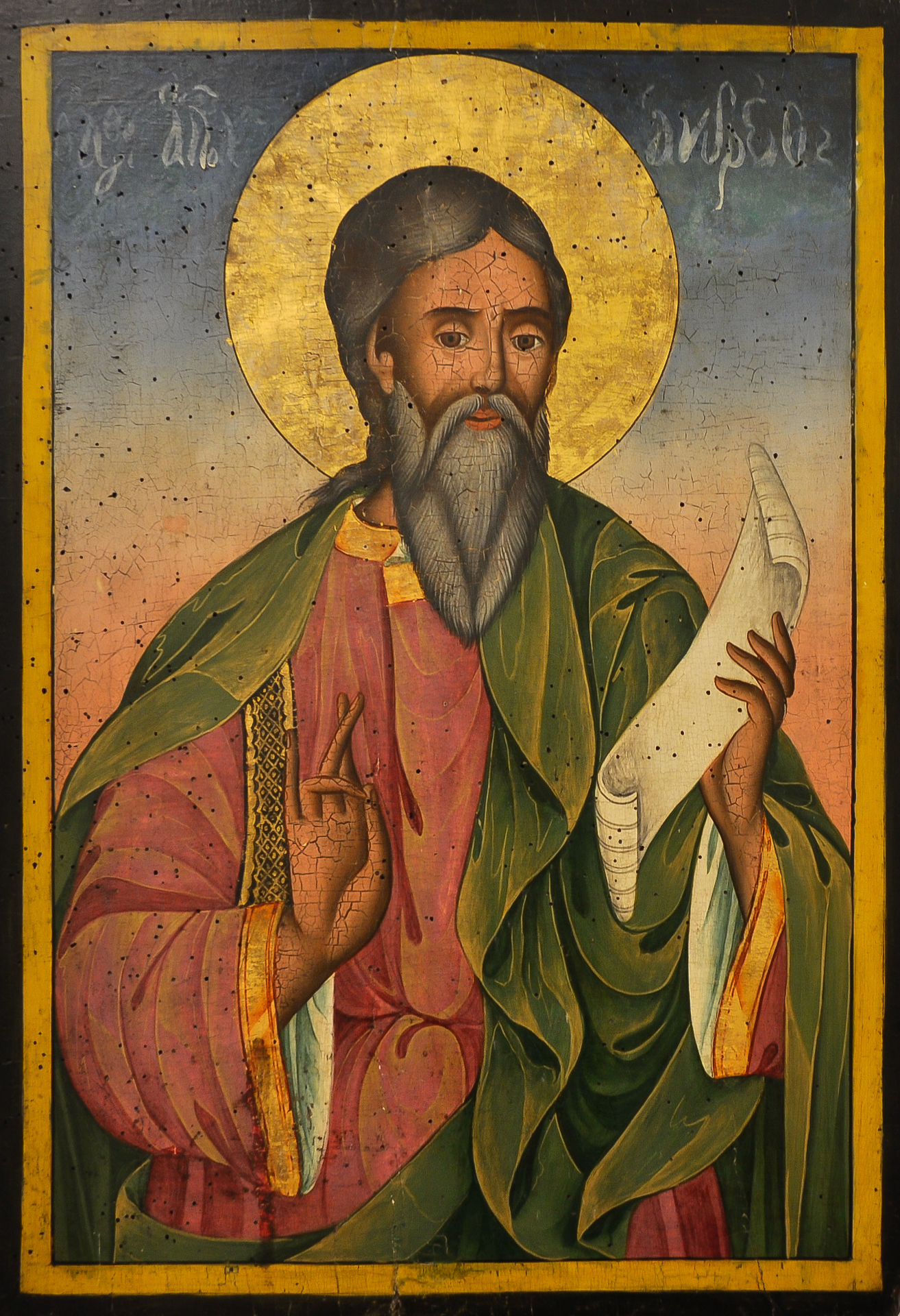
Icon of St Andrew the Apostle

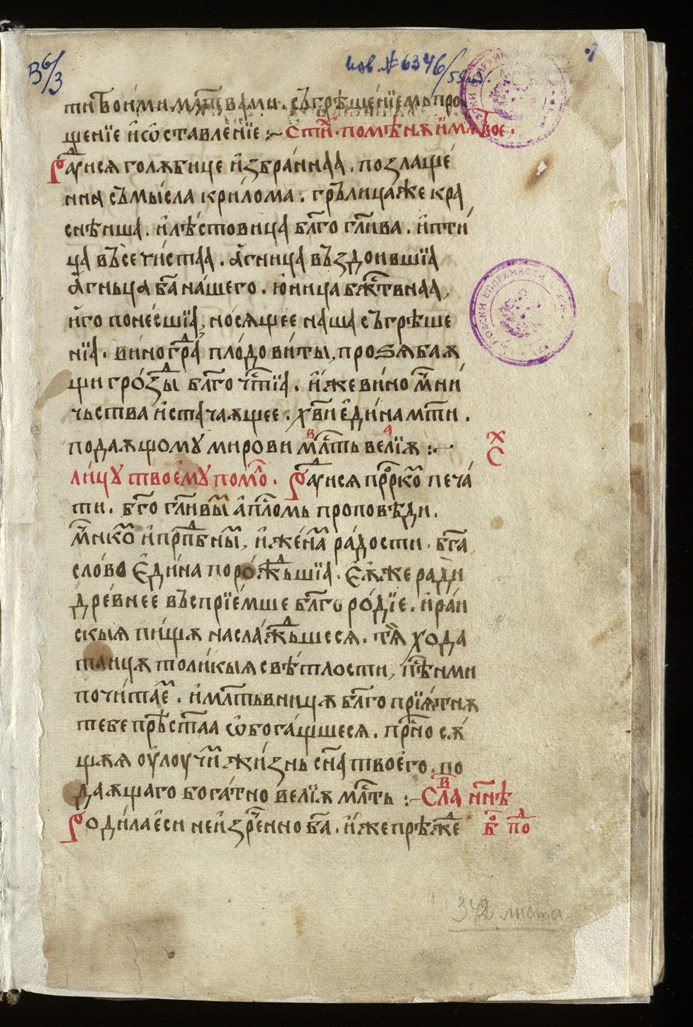
Octoechos in the Middle-Bulgarian language

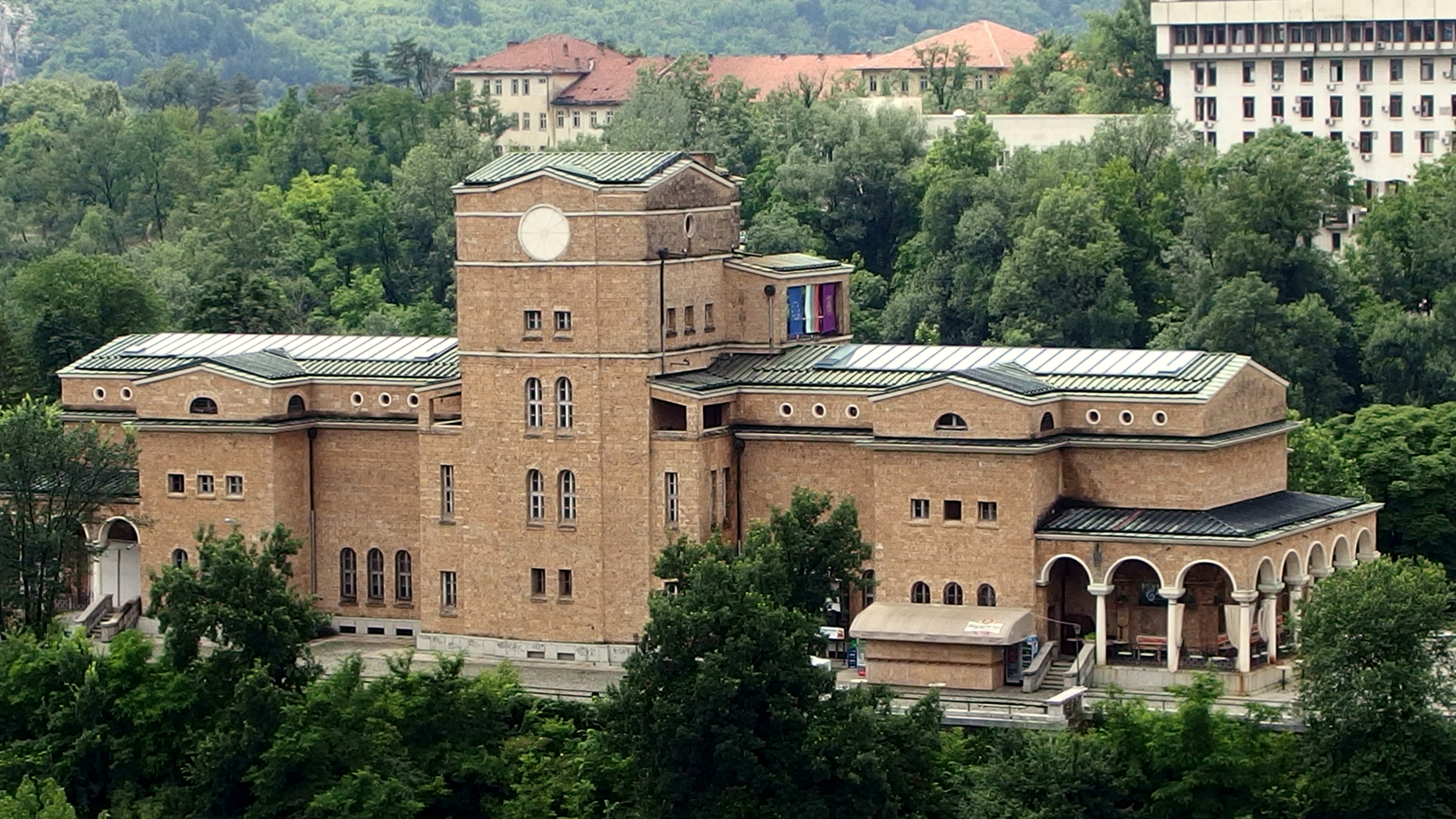
The City Gallery

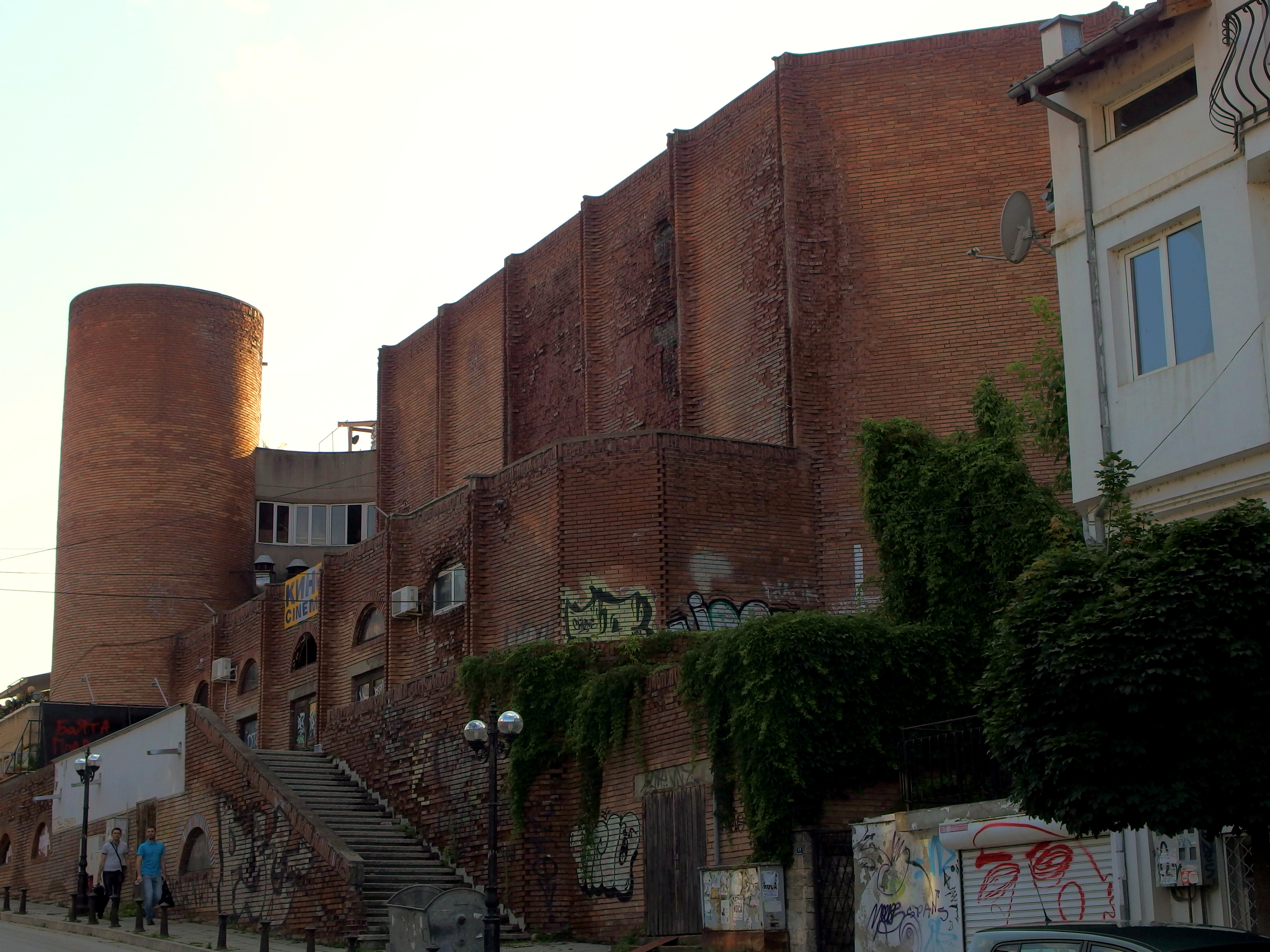
Poltava cinema in the city center

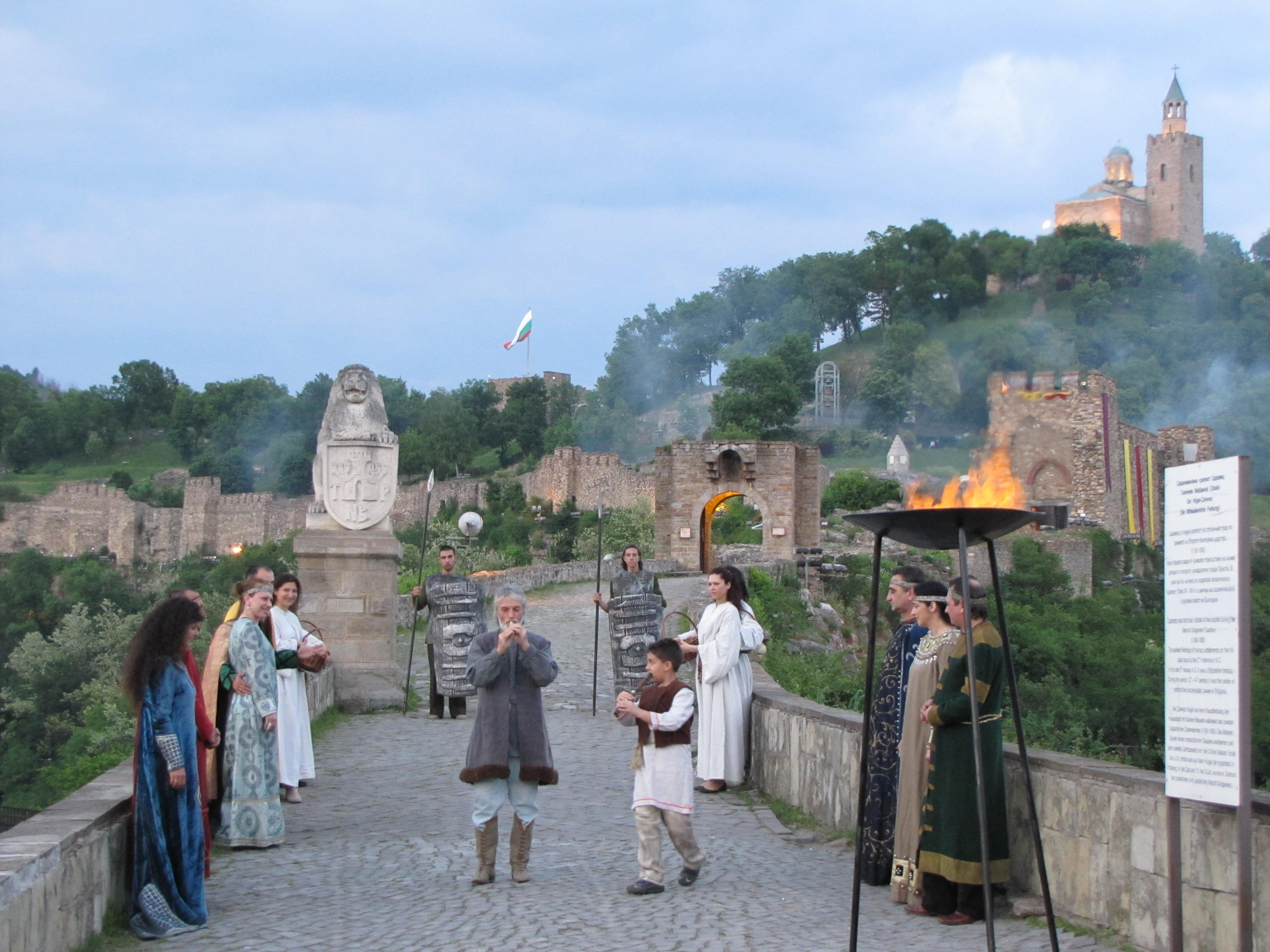
Medieval costumes

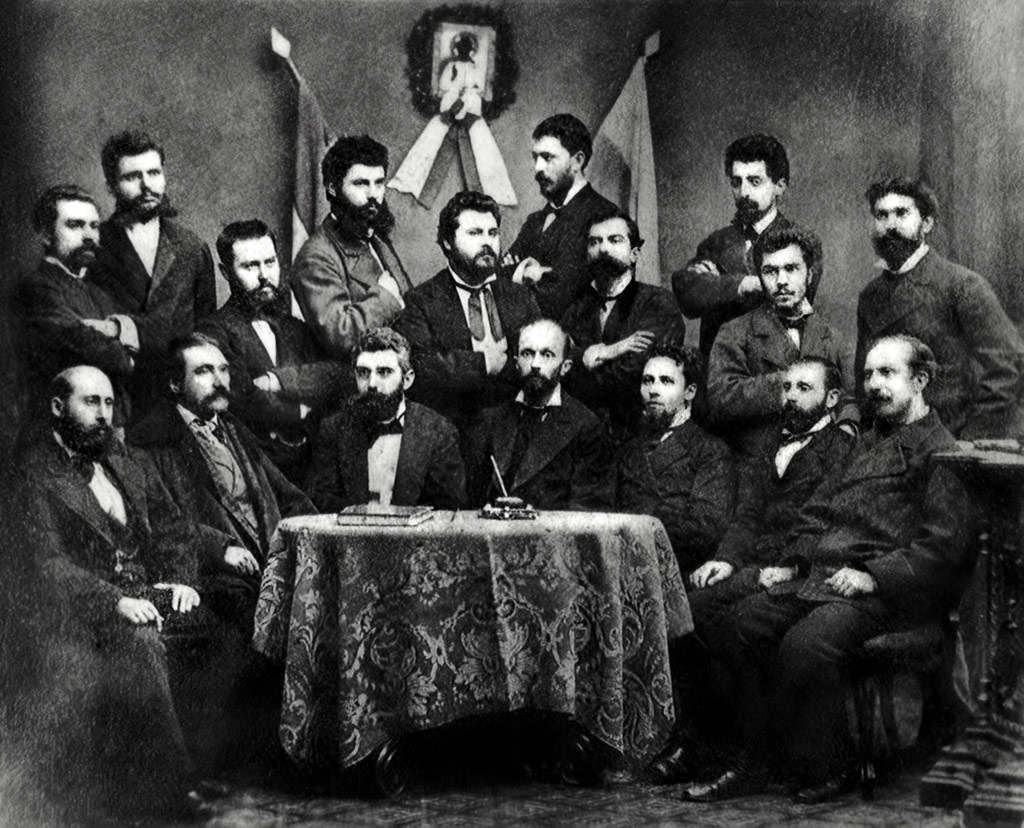
Wear of Bulgarian Liberal Party leaders in 1879

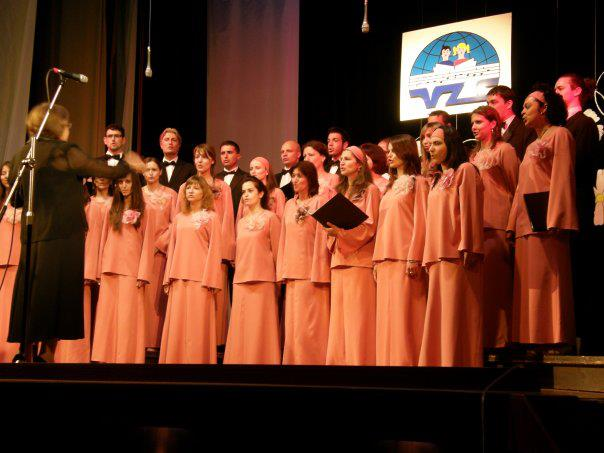
Choir Cantilena

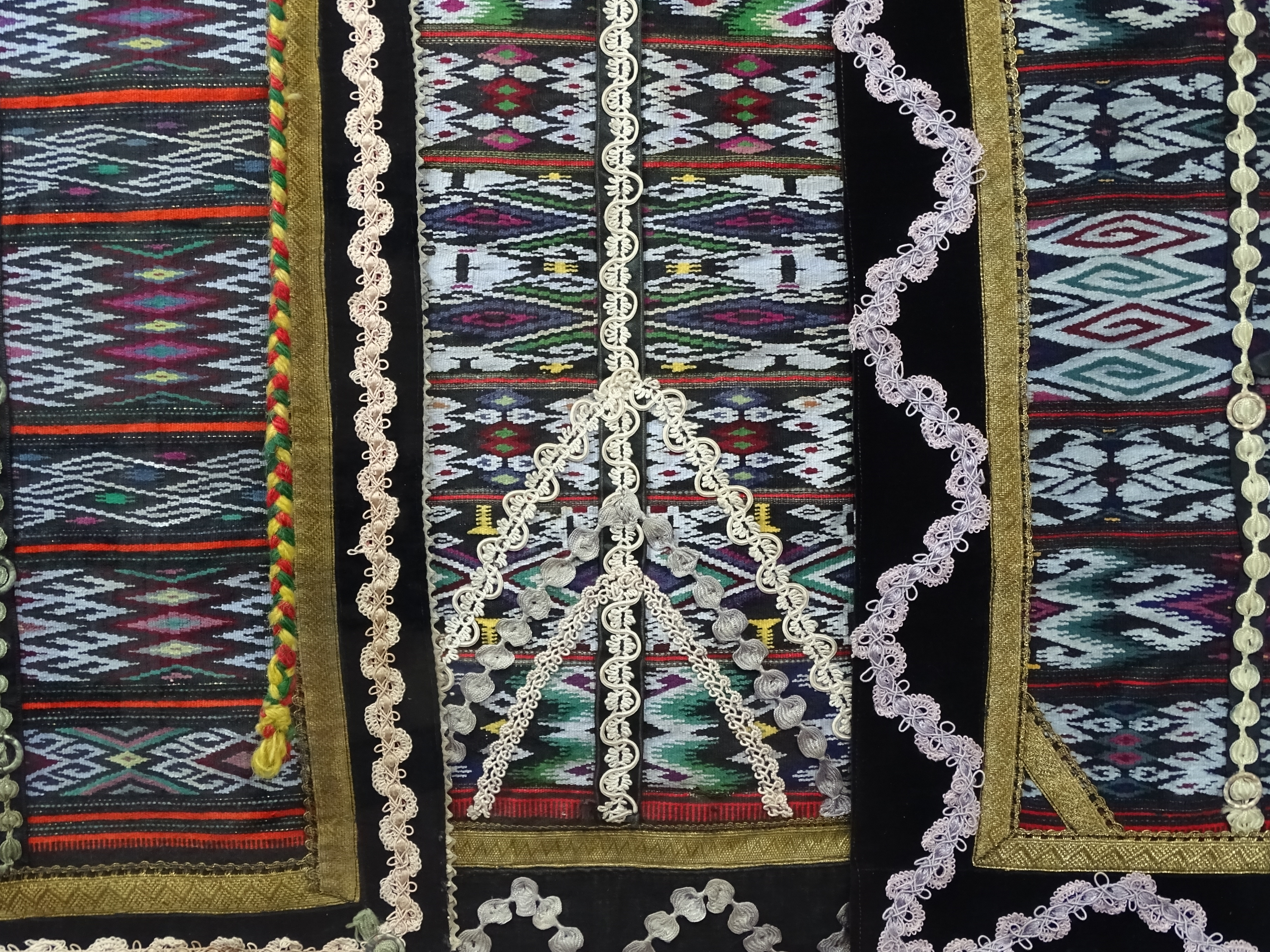
Traditional embroidery

The culture of Veliko Tarnovo concerns the arts, museums, festivals and other entertainment in Veliko Tarnovo, Bulgaria.

== Music ==
In medieval Turnovo (Tarnovgrad), Orthodox church music and medieval Bulgarian folklore were the basis of the Bulgarian culture. The first piano in Bulgaria was imported into the city in the beginning of XVII century. A brass band was created in 1967. Boris Shopov is one of the founders and longtime teachers of the Children's Music School in Veliko Tarnovo.

== Literature ==
There is scarce information about church and secular literature and poetry in Old Bulgarian. The most striking trace in the Medieval literature is left by the writers:Theodosius of Tarnovo, Methodius Svetogorets, Stefan Svetogorets, Konstantin Kostenechki, Gregory Tsamblak, Dimitar Kantakuzin, Tsani Ginchev. With dozens of novels, poetry and short stories, the creators Petko Slaveykov, Emiliyan Stanev, Assen Razcvetnikov stay in the history of the modern Bulgarian literature.

== Art ==
The creators of the Art School of Tarnovo leave the brightest trace of Bulgarian medieval creativity. Thousands of churches and monasteries were drawn from these figures throughout the Balkan Peninsula. Prominent Renaissance artists: Boris Denev. Contemporary Artists Nikola Donchev Totev – founder of the company of Turnovo artists, Angel Karaneshev, Ivan Valchanov, Asen Momchev, Angel Angelov, Blagoi Ivanov, Velio Mitev, Georgi Kostov, Krasimir Dobrev – Doctors, Margarita Pueva, Velio Mite, h. x. Jordan Popov, Nestor Ivanov, Denio Chokanov.

== Cinema ==
The first movie in the city was screened by Slovakian Yuri Kuzmich, who installed a cinema at Haralambi Penkov's store. In 1912, a modern theater cinema was built in the city in the place of Dryanovski inn. Until then, screenings will be held in the hall of the Chitalishte "Hope". The first tourist movie is being screened in the city. In 1945, a movie theater was built at the Iskra Culture Center. In 1974, the Poltava Cinema building was built, which remains emblematic of the city. The cinema hall discontinued its operations in 2010 and was destroyed in 2019

== Fashion ==
=== Formal wear ===
During the period of the Second Bulgarian Kingdom, the clothing of the rulers consisted of the following elements: dalmatia / divtation, loros, purple, zohus. Acacia, crown and scepter are added to them. The fabric of the royal family's and boyars' clothes was made of silk, linen and cotton. According to different color sources, they were mostly red or purple. Often the aristocratic costumes in the Second Bulgarian Kingdom are studded with pearls, precious stones and embroidered with gold brimstone. The clothes of other classes, whether of hemp, wool or leather. During the Renaissance, only the most wealthy and power-minded Turnovans were dressed in clothes influenced by Western Europe. After the Liberation of Bulgaria from Ottoman slavery, the European culture of clothing entered the city. The first fashion show took place in the city, it was the work of Evdokia Antonova, daughter of Anton Zarkov Zlatev, a well-known merchant of fabrics, money-lender and chiflikchia. In the streets, under lit streetlights, on aristocratic streets, citizens with rags and bombs and their wives with long dresses, crinolines, ruffles – wavy / corrugated / ornaments as well as wide, rich Buffon decorations were increasingly visible. Turnovo tailors in the beginning of the XX century, were known all over Northern Bulgaria. They were well aware of the tailoring in Italy and France.

=== Traditional wear ===
The traditional women's Tarnovo costume consisted of: a hairpiece – mostly white (in some cases with red patterns), a white shirt with red or red-green patterns around the sleeves, a black dress, a black apron with several alternating rows of patterns: green, yellow, red, slippers – silver or gilded, pendants. Men were most often in white shirts, with red cuts and trousers.

== Museums ==
The Regional Museum of History (Veliko Turnovo) has been in existence since 1879, with its original exposition being presented at the Chitalishte "Nadezhda". It is a find from antiquity and the Middle Ages. Since 1954, the museum has expanded significantly after changing its location several times. By the early 1960s, 16,000 archeological units were being stored in the museum.

Museum Gallery

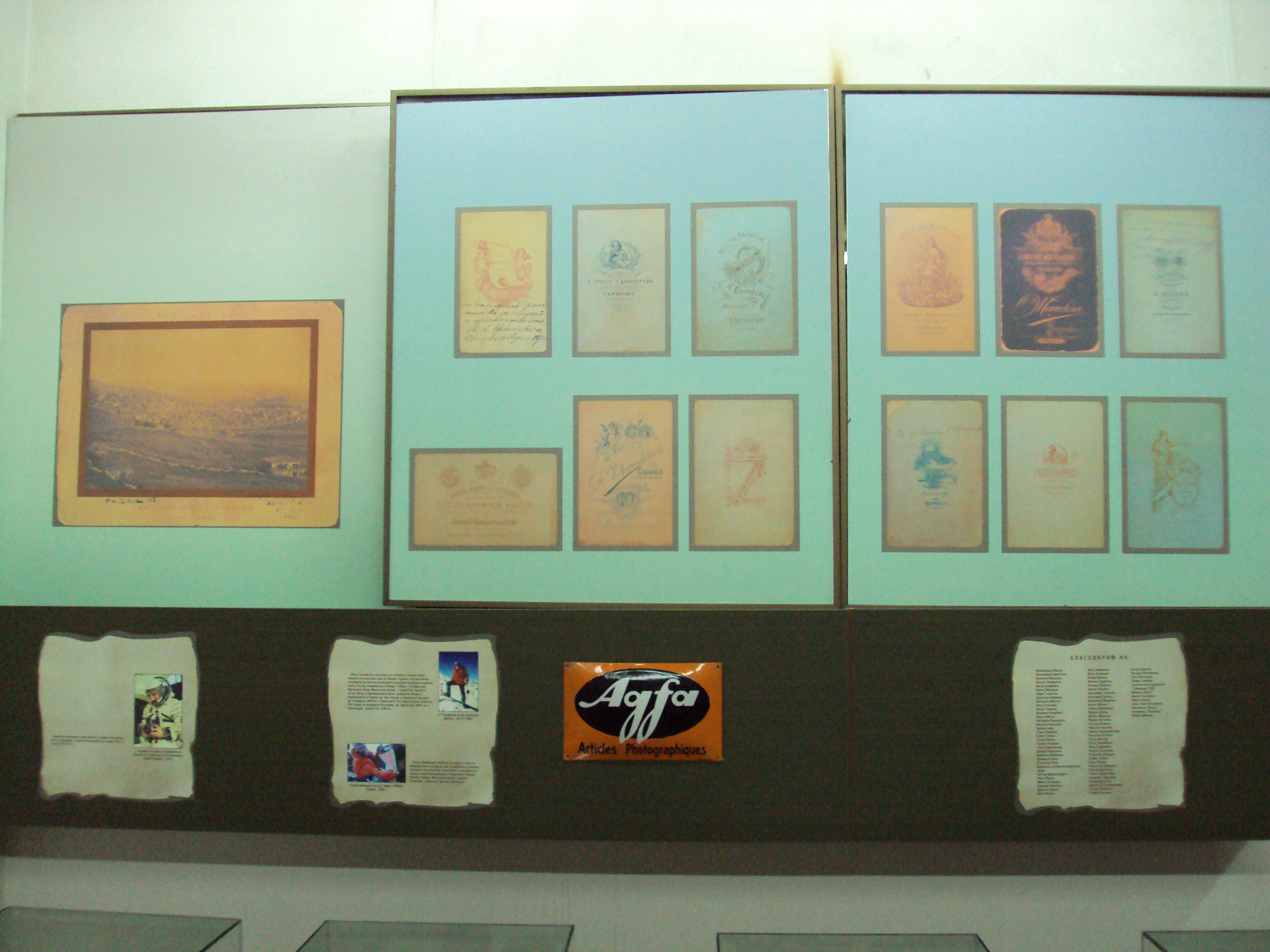

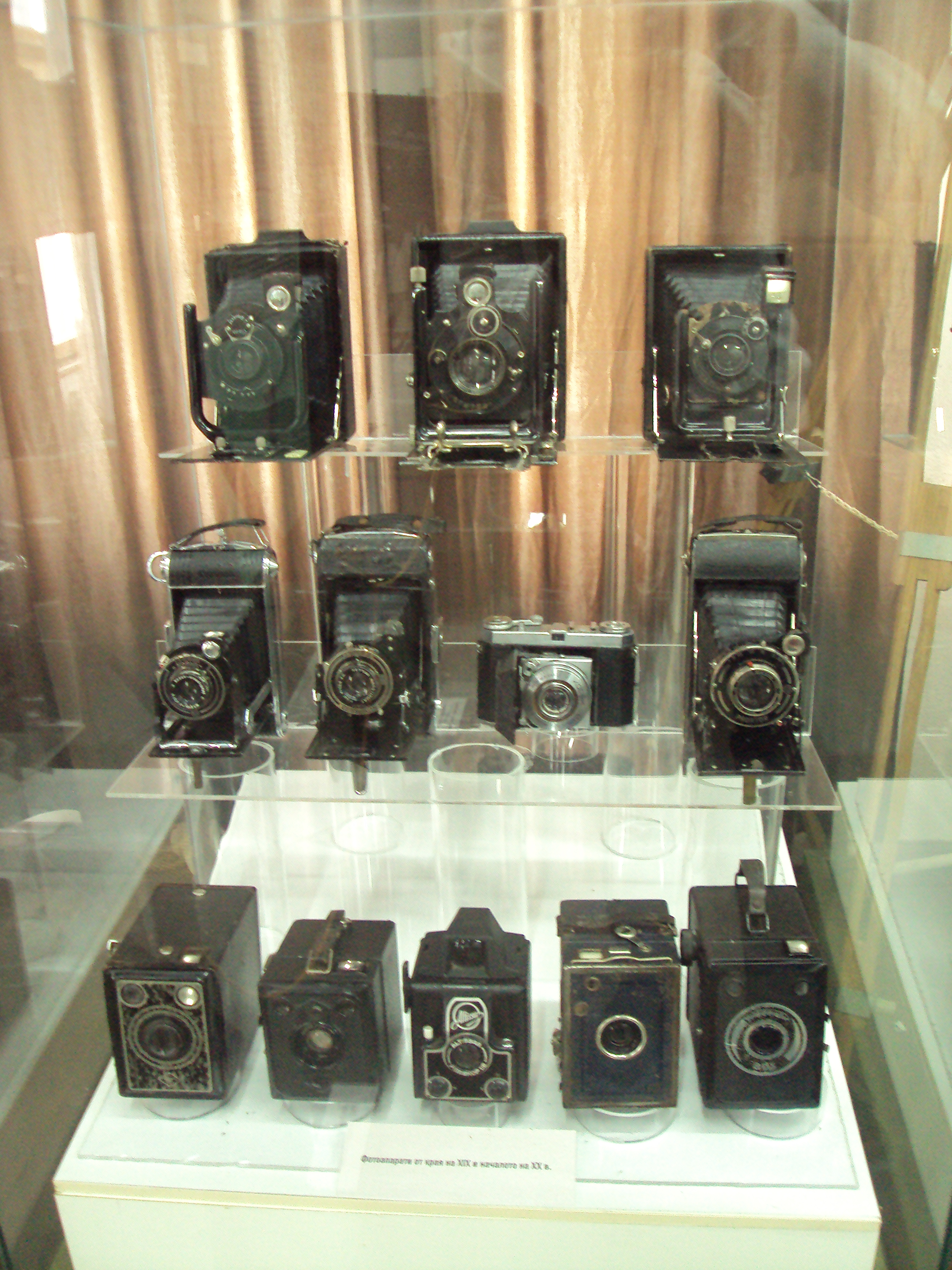

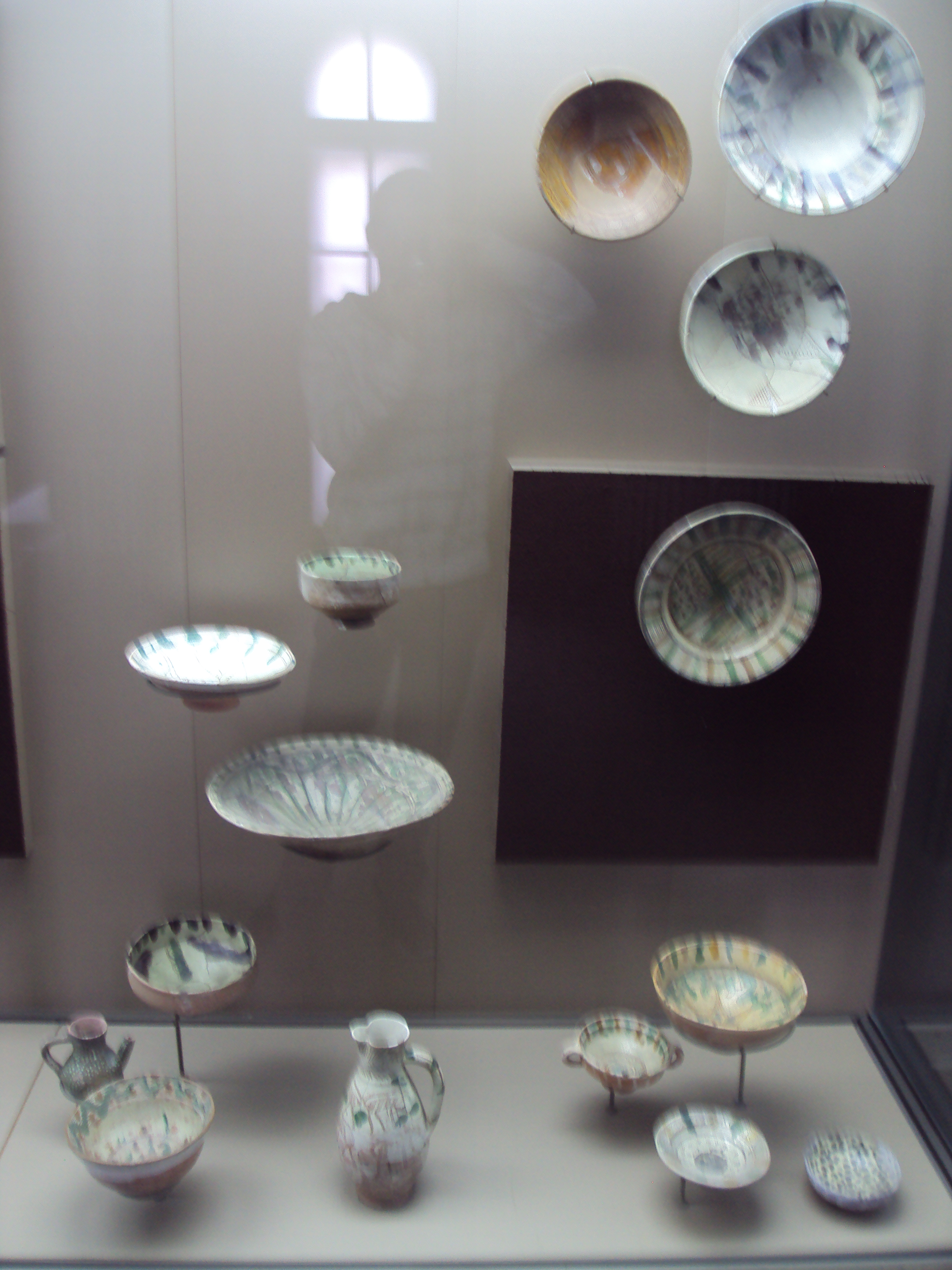

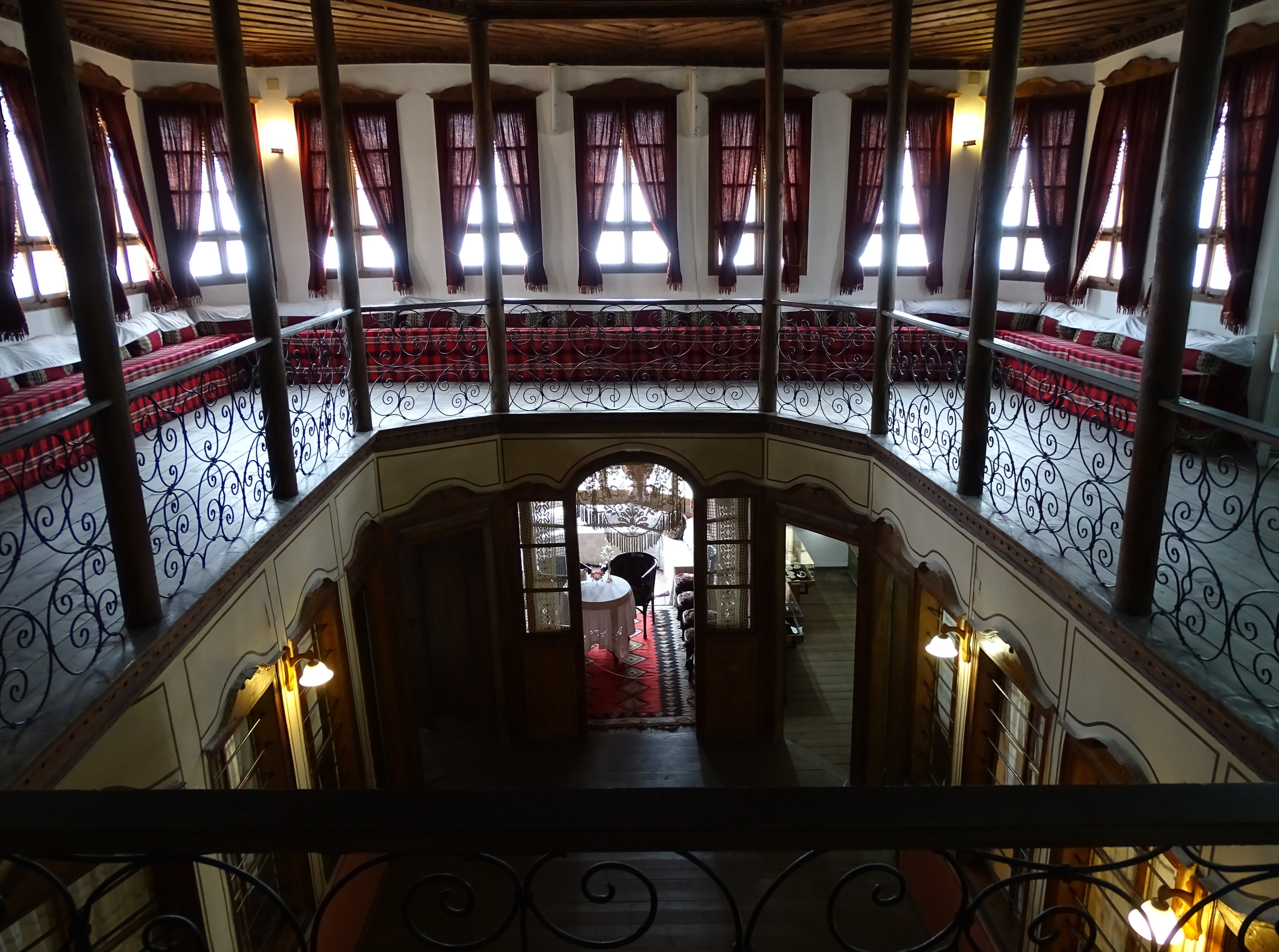
Saradkina house

== See also ==
- Architecture of Veliko Tarnovo
