= Roza Popova =

Bulgarian actress (1879–1949)

- Роза Попова
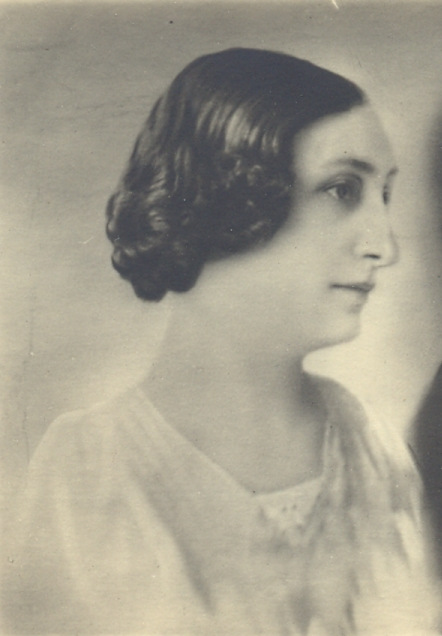
- Popova in 1939
- Born: Ruska Mihaylova Manuilova; Руска Михайлова Мануилова; 1879; Sofia, Bulgaria
- Died: 11 April 1949 (aged 69–70); Mezdra, Bulgaria
- Spouse: Stoyan Popov

Ruska Mihaylova Manuilova (Bulgarian: Руска Михайлова Мануилова, 1879 – 11 April 1949) or better known as her stage name Roza Popova (Bulgarian: Роза Попова), was a Bulgarian actress and theater director and the wife of the Bulgarian writer Chicho Stoyan.

== Biography ==
=== Early life and debut ===
Roza Popova was born in Sofia, Bulgaria in 1879. She married in secret a little past her 16th birthday.

She studied theatrical arts under the direction of Konstantin Sapunov. During her high school education, she found her passion of acting and joined the traveling theatrical troupe "Zora". In 1897, Roza Popova makes her debut with her role of Sophia in "Iskreno Priyatelstvo" by Sardu in Veliko Tarnovo, the old capital of Bulgaria.

However, official records state that her first major role and debut was in the play by Victor Hugo – Lucrezia Borgia (play) in the role of Lucrezia, with the collaboration of the most successful Bulgarian troupe – "Salza i Smyah". She then proceeded to play in the troupe alongside her husband, leading the troupe herself between 1900 and 1902. Afterward, she joined the Croatian troupe of M. Stoikovich.

=== Middle years ===
In 1900 she was stalked by her admirer Todor Bogdanov, who was her teacher from Vratsa. On January 20, 1903, he shot her and himself, and died. She regained her strength despite the bad wound. She was also released from the service of the theater in the same year.

In the period between 1904 and 1906, she joined the troupe in Plovdiv.

The next town she went to was Vienna, where she studied literature and medicine in the Vienna University. During 1910 she was appointed as the first director in the Ruse theater.

In 1918 she founded her own theater "Roza Popova".

== Theatre roles ==
Major theatre roles in which Roza Popova acted:

- Antigone – Antigone by Sophocles
- Medea – Medea: A Tragedy in Three Acts by Ernest Legouvé
- Vela and Malama – Vampire by Anton Strashimirov
- Margarita Gauthier – The Lady of the Camellias by Alexandre Dumas fils
- Sappho – Sappho by Franz Grillparzer
- Sonya and Elena Andreevna – Uncle Vanya by Anton Chekhov

In 1926, Teodor Trayanov devoted a poem "Skitnishki napev" to her.
