= Sofia Boys Choir =

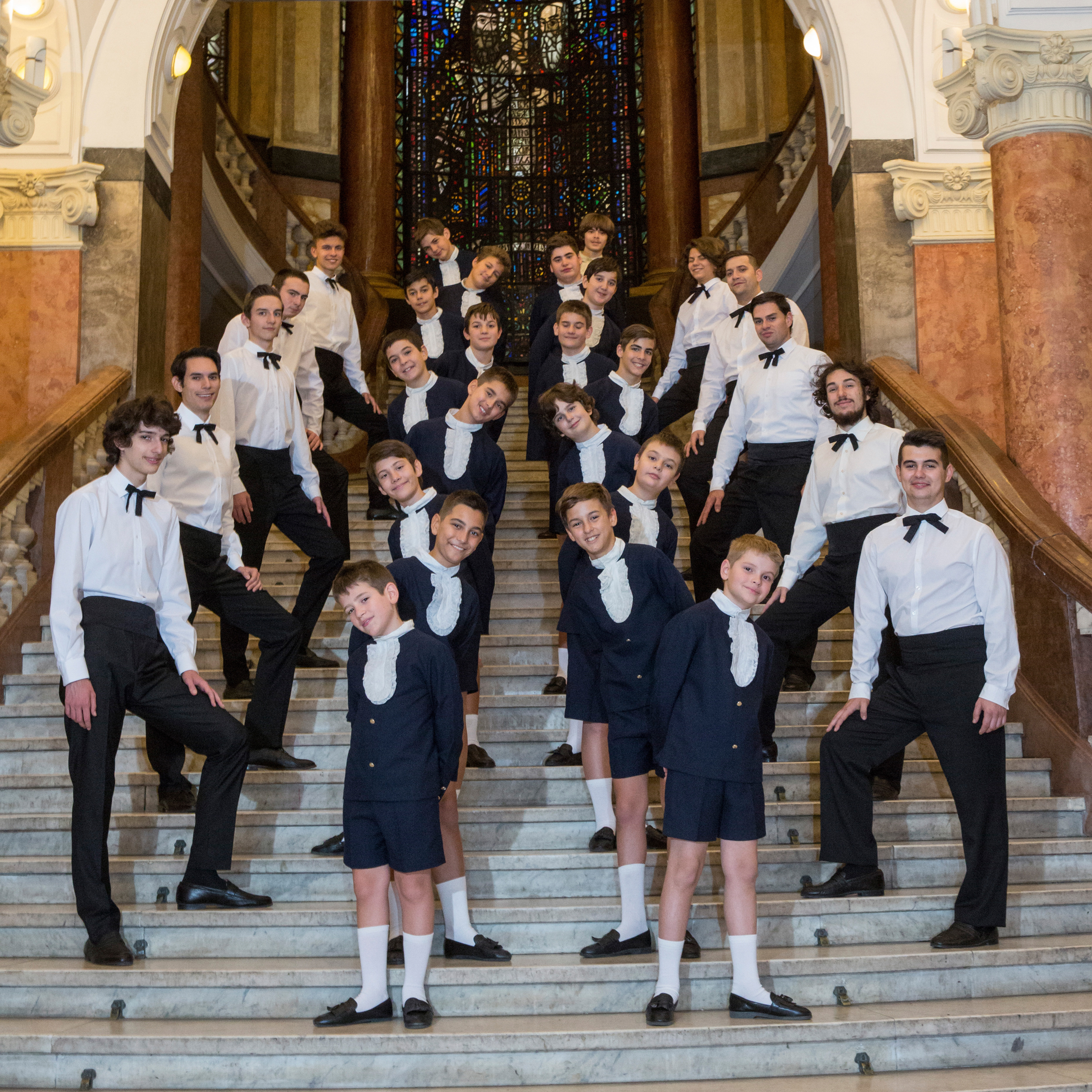

Background information
- Origin: Sofia, Bulgaria
- Genres: Boys' choir, choral music
- Years active: 1968–present

The Sofia Boys Choir, founded in 1968, is the first boys' choir in Bulgaria. Artists from 8 to 15 years old are selected from schools in Sofia. Adriana Blagoeva has been a conductor of the choir since 1989. In 1997, she founded the Youth Formation ensemble with the Sofia Boys Choir, consisting of former members of the boys' choir. Today the choir has three ensembles: boys, youth, and mixed.

The Sofia Boys Choir has a very wide-ranging repertoire, including Bulgarian choral music, Orthodox music, Bulgarian folk music, and choral pieces in various other musical genres and eras, from the 14th century to today. The choir also performs in musicals and operas. Recordings of many of the choir’s performances are stored in the archives of Bulgarian National Radio (BNR) and Bulgarian National Television (BNT). The choir’s performances have been published on 20 audio CDs (11 solo and nine with other musicians).

Since 1993, the Sofia Boys Choir has won many awards at international choral competitions and has toured throughout Europe and Japan.
