= Art School of Tarnovo =

Art school in Tarnovo, Second Bulgarian Empire

The Art School of Tarnovo (in Bulgarian: Търновска художествена школа) was an art school in the old Bulgarian capital — Tarnovo (now Veliko Tarnovo) — during the Second Bulgarian Empire and Bulgarian National Revival from the 15th to 19th centuries.

Many directions in Bulgarian art, music, and architecture from the Second Bulgarian Empire were developed by graduates of this school, as the Architecture of the Tarnovo Artistic School.

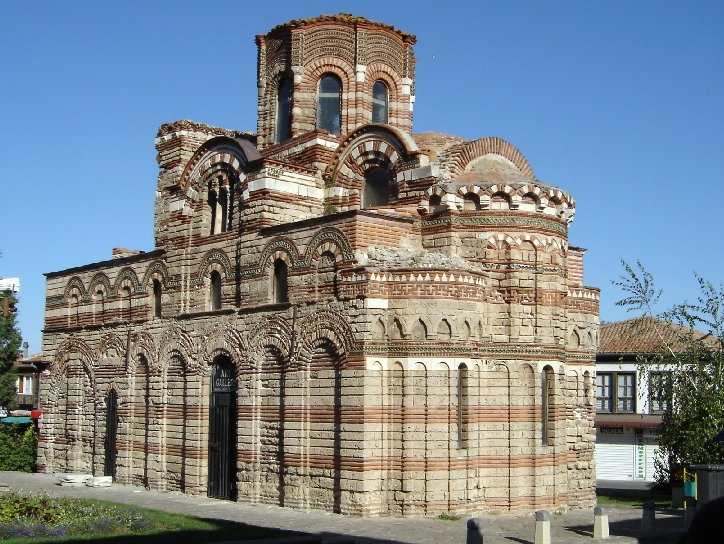
Nessebar, Church Pantocrator
