= Architecture of the Tarnovo Artistic School =

Period in Bulgarian architecture

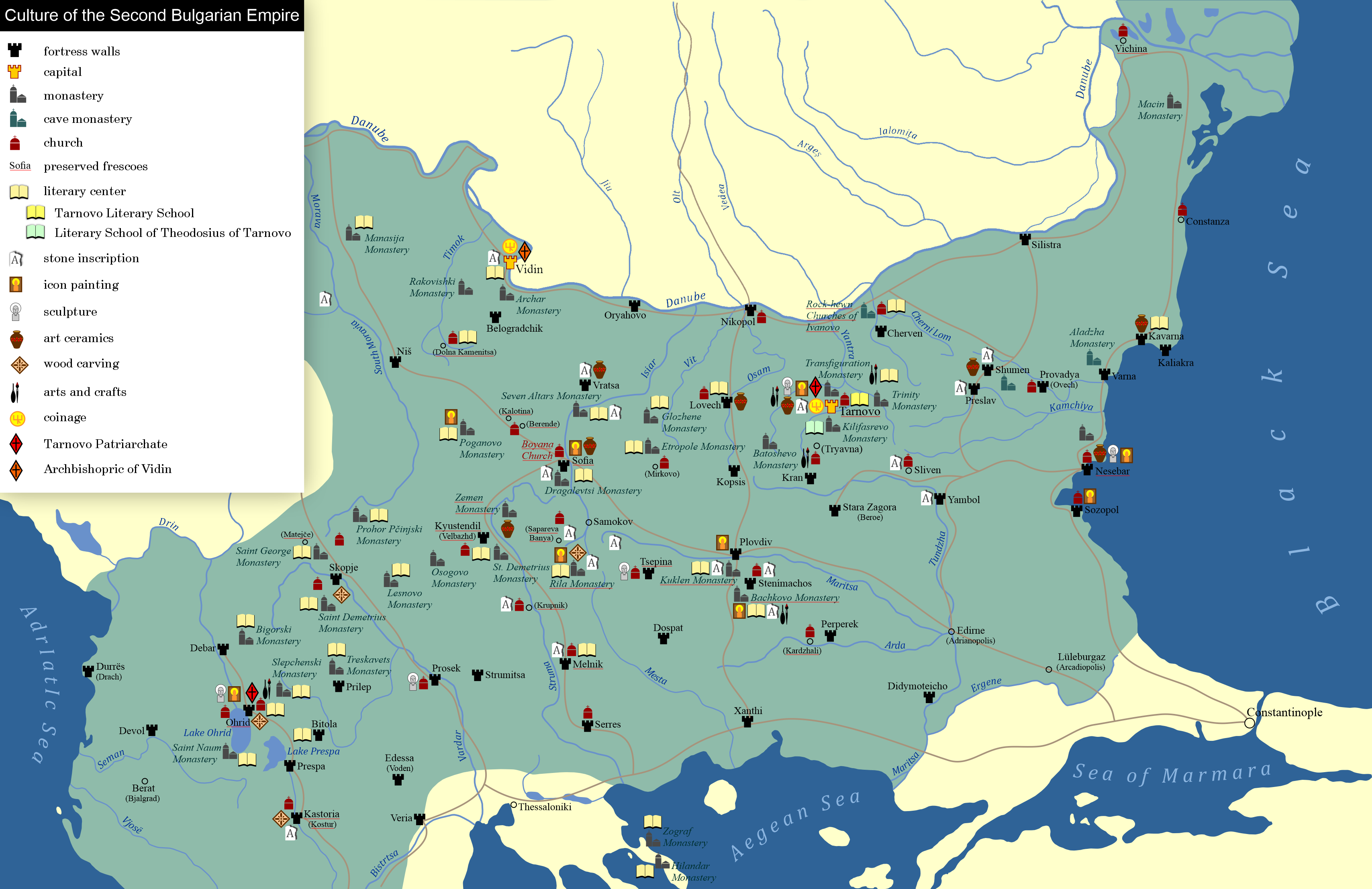
Culture of the Second Bulgarian Empire

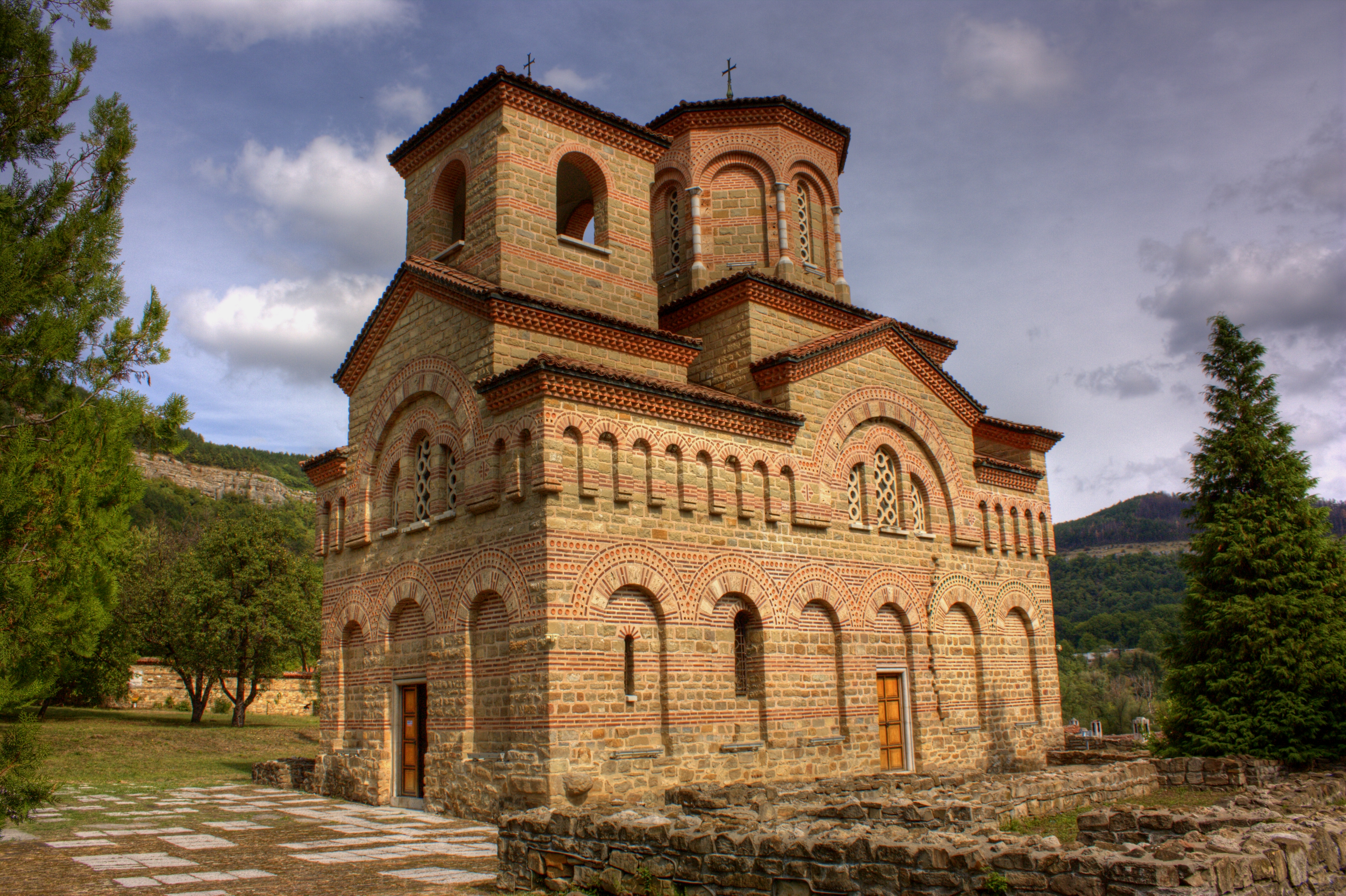
Church of St Demetrius of Thessaloniki, Veliko Tarnovo

The Architecture of the Tarnovo Artistic School is a term for the development of architecture during the Second Bulgarian Empire (1185–1396). In the 13th and 14th centuries the capital Tarnovo determined the progress of the Bulgarian architecture with many edifices preserved or reconstructed which show the skills of the Medieval Bulgarian architects and the construction and decorative techniques they used. The builders have created a unique architectural style, known as Tarnovian Style (Tarnovo style), that influenced the architecture in many countries of Southeastern Europe and parts of Central Europe. With its diverse architecture, the Tarnovo School may be separated into several branches according to the function of the buildings.

== Religious architecture ==
=== Design ===
A general plan of SS. Forty Martyrs Church in Tarnovo

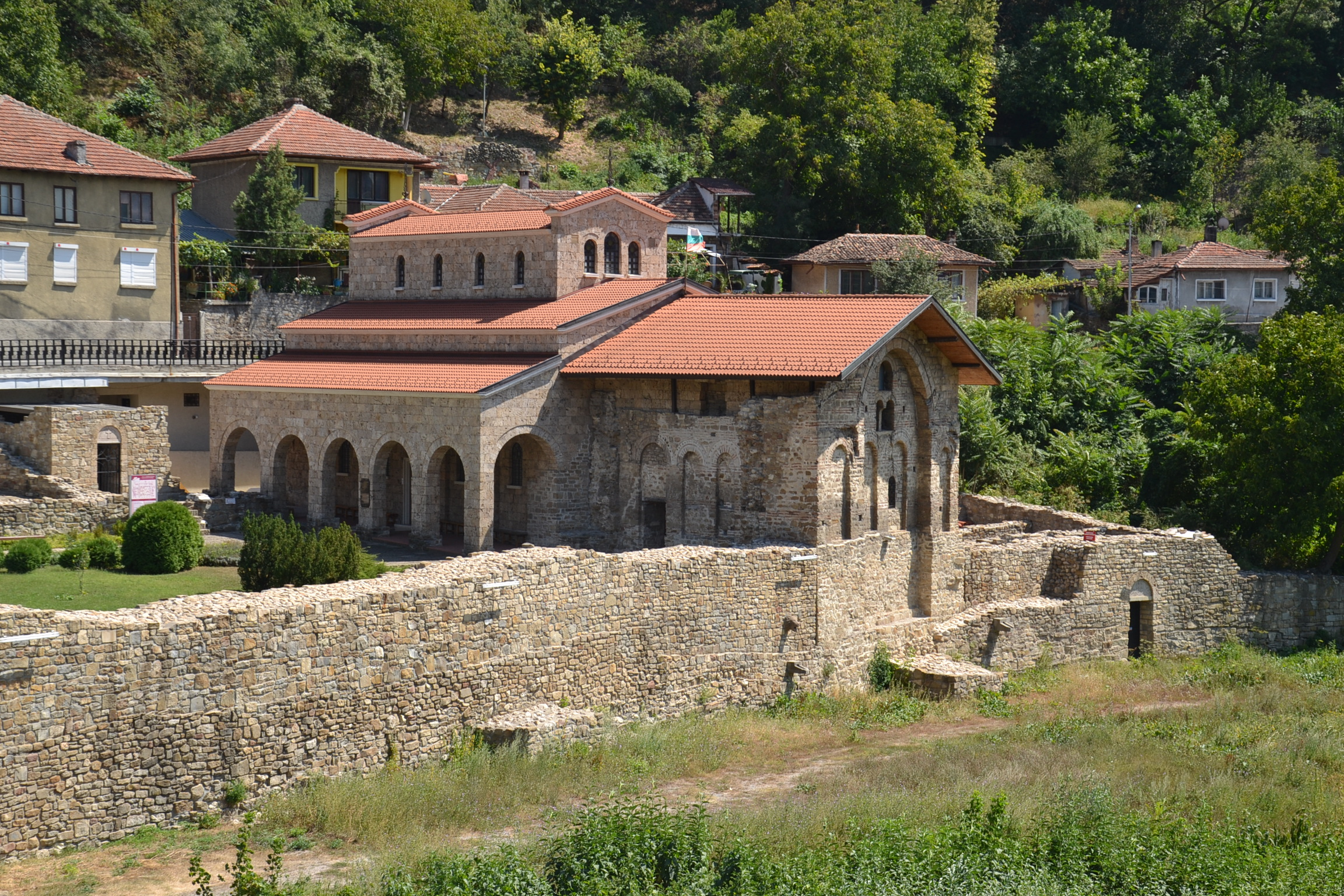
Exterior of SS. Forty Martyrs Church in Tarnovo

During the Second Bulgarian Empire the churches did not have large or complicated designs because they were intended to be a place of penance. Typical of the Tarnovo School of Architecture were relatively small cruciform dome churches or basilicas. At the expense of its small length and width, the churches rose to height. They were often built over a stone base around one meter high. As a principle the main entrance was located to the west. After the doorway followed the pritvor (narthex), the naos and the altar. A small rectangular bell-tower sometimes rose above the narthex ("St Dimitar of Solun" in Tarnovo, the Church in the Asenova krepost in Asenovgrad, the Church of Christ Pantocrator in Nessebar and others). The naos could be separated into naves (in the basilicas) with columns or pillars.

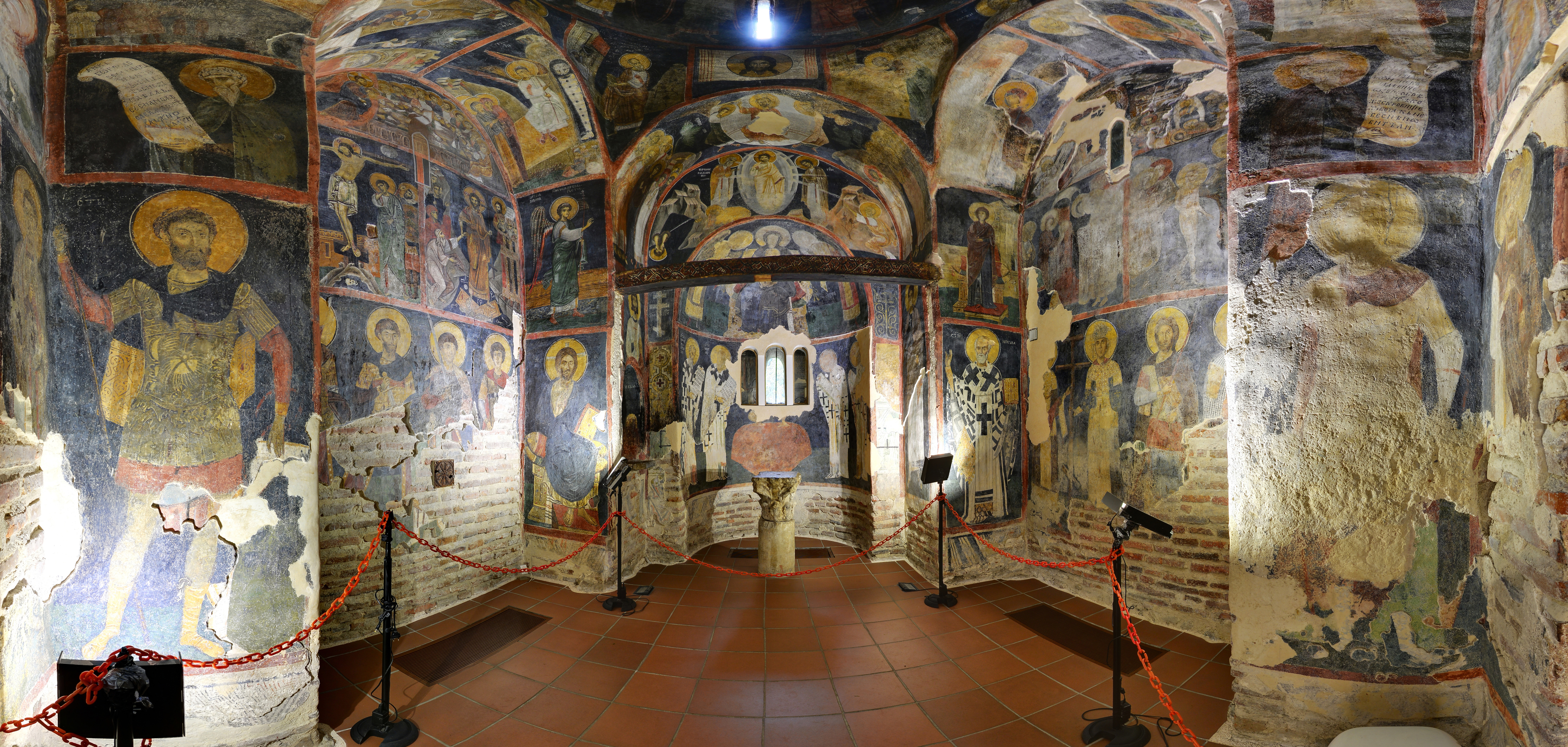
Interior view with the frescoes dating back to 1259, Boyana Church in Sofia, UNESCO World Heritage List landmark.

According to the number of naves the churches were one-naved (Church of St Demetrius of Thessaloniki, Veliko Tarnovo in the Asen's Neighbourhood, Tarnovo, Boyana Church), two-naved ("St Ivan of Rila" in Trapezitsa, Tarnovo) and three-naved (SS. Forty Martyrs Church in Tarnovo, "St Nicola" in Melnik). In the cruciform dome churches (Church of St John Aliturgetos and Church of Christ Pantocrator, both in Nessebar) the dome lied over four columns which were connected to the walls with arches. The altar was formed by a semicircular or polygonal apse. In some churches the altar was separated into three parts and the external ones (called bema and diakonnik) were used for safe-keeping of the church plates, garments and books. In that case there was usually a triple apse. The design was complicated by a pre-apse space. The vaults were semicircular and built of bricks. Some churches had outhouse parts such as galleries (SS. Forty Martyrs Church and "St Peter and Pavel" in Tarnovo), chapels (Boyana Church), ossuaries and others. The Church "St Virgin Maria of Petrich" in the Asenova krepost has two stories and the lower one served as an ossuary.

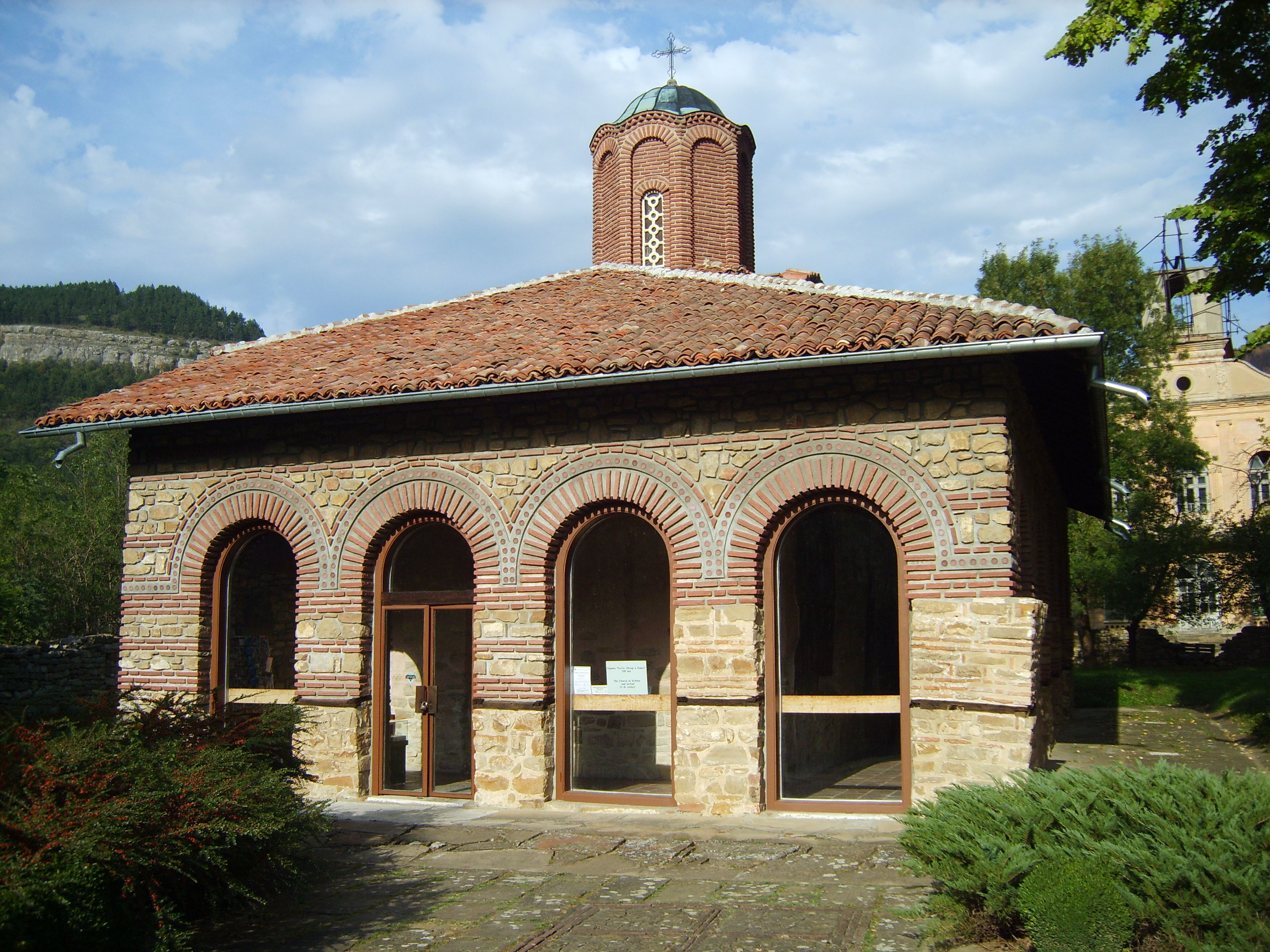
Church of Saints Peter and Paul, Veliko Tarnovo

A peculiar type of Christian churches were those with a triconch plan. They are small, one-naved with or without a narthex. Their main peculiarity were the three conchas (apses) placed in the eastern, southern and northern walls of the naos. The small dome is laid directly on the walls. The conchal churches can be found mainly in the monasteries and are not so exquisite. Examples include the church in the "St Archangels" Monastery in Tran, "St Nicola Mrachki" in the Peshterski Monastery and others.

=== Decorative ornaments ===
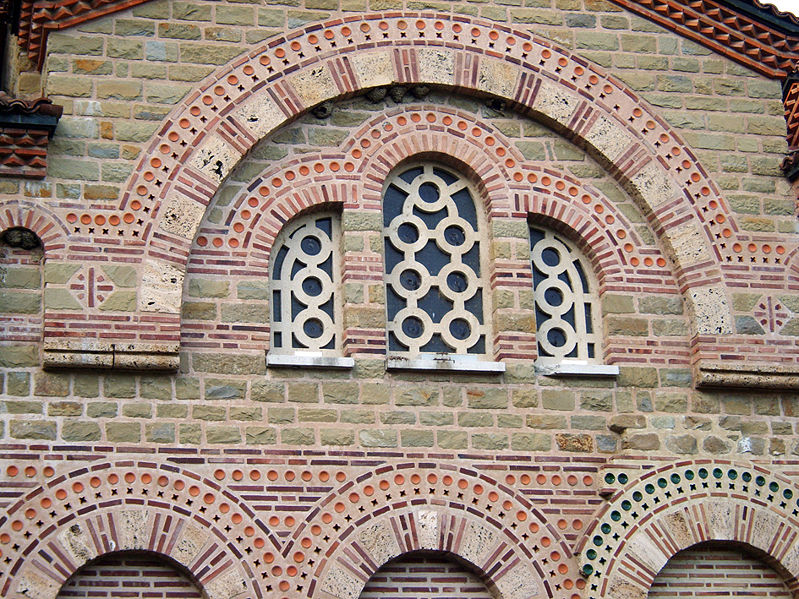
A detail from Church of St Demetrius of Thessaloniki, Veliko Tarnovo

The main feature of the Tarnovo School of Architecture is the rich decorative ornamentation in exterior of the edifices. The technique that was used was called mixed construction in which belts of stone and bricks alternated with each other. That method was a heritage from the Roman architecture (opus mixtum) but in that case it had lost its initial constructive application and was used mainly with artistic purpose. The wide plaster fugues also had decorative purpose. The builder chose different types of stone (limestone, travertine, marble, granite), and the bricks had varied shape and dimensions and were put in different positions forming decorative ornaments and monograms. A cell type method was sometimes used in which each stone block was completely surrounded by bricks. The bricks were painted in red in order to increase the contrast. The facades of the churches were segmented by deep niches (often with two steps) decorated with flying buttresses and archvaults. Unlike the churches in Constantinople the niches from the Tarnovo School of Architecture do not respond to the interior (pseudo constructive niches) and were used for purely decorative purpose. As an additional decoration rows of clay circles and four-leaves glazed in green, brown, yellow or orange were used. The origins of that type of decoration are in the Arab architecture. The Nessebar churches "St John Aliturgetos" and "Christ Pantocrator" have especially sumptuous decoration.

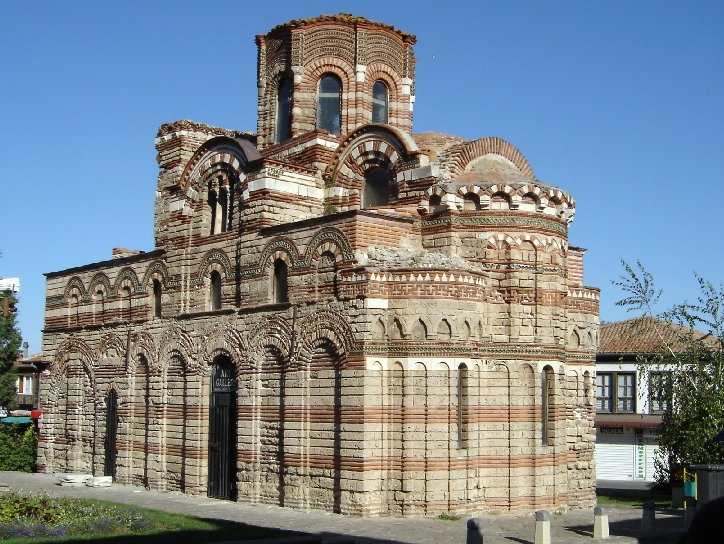
Church of Christ Pantocrator, Nesebar

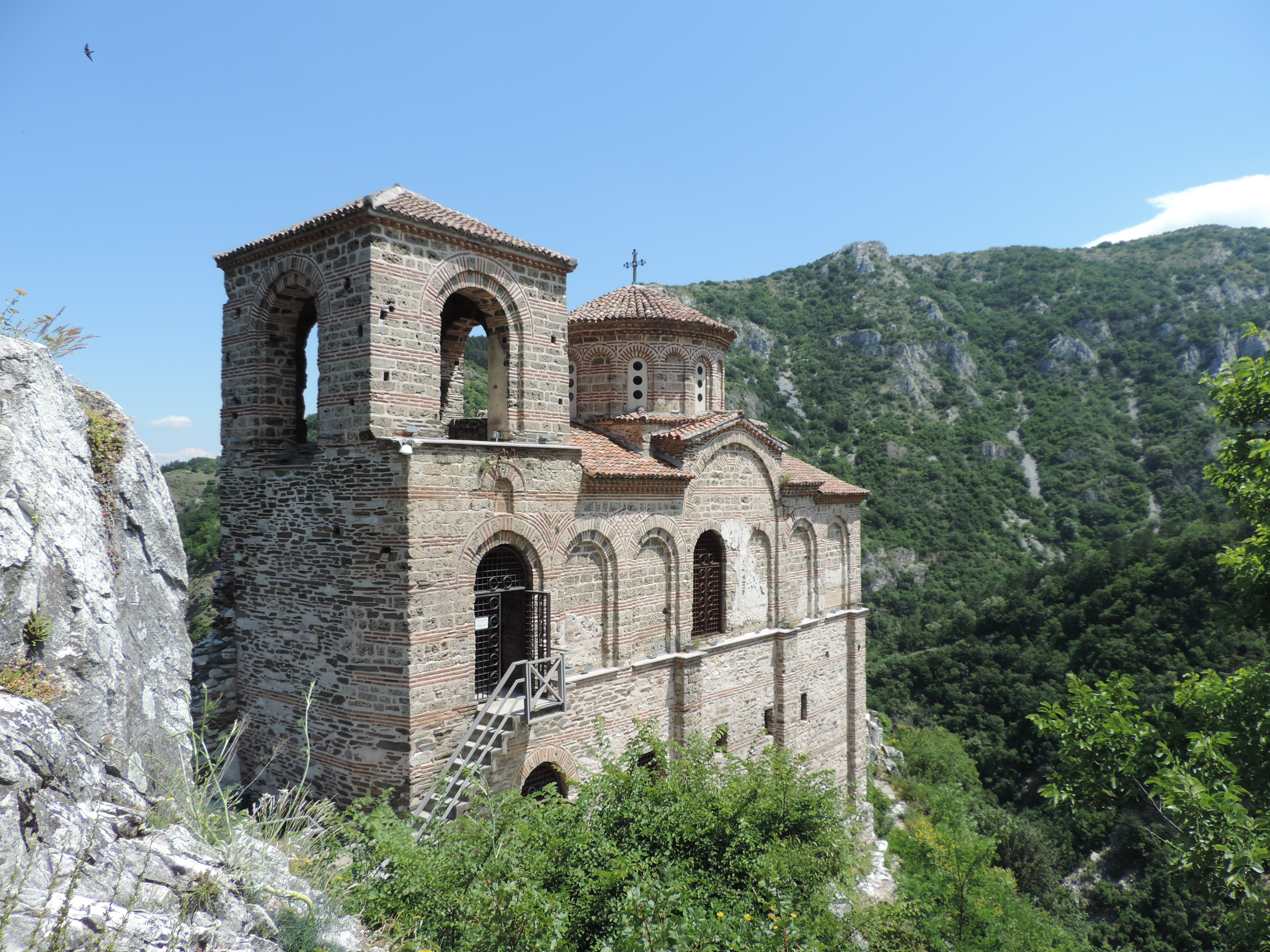
Church of the Holy Mother of God, Asen's Fortress

Sometimes the architects used painting to decorate certain elements. The lunettes of the niches of St Dimitar of Solun Church in the capital were plastered up and painted with rhomboid patterns. High on the walls in some churches consoles were built in on which laid small decorative arches. The roofs were covered with tiles or lead plates (the initial cover of St Peter and Pavel in Tarnovo), the dome was narrow and high with circular or polygonal shape. The polygonal domes were characterized with small columns on the corners. The appearance of the churches was complemented with sculptures and paintings.

=== Monasteries ===
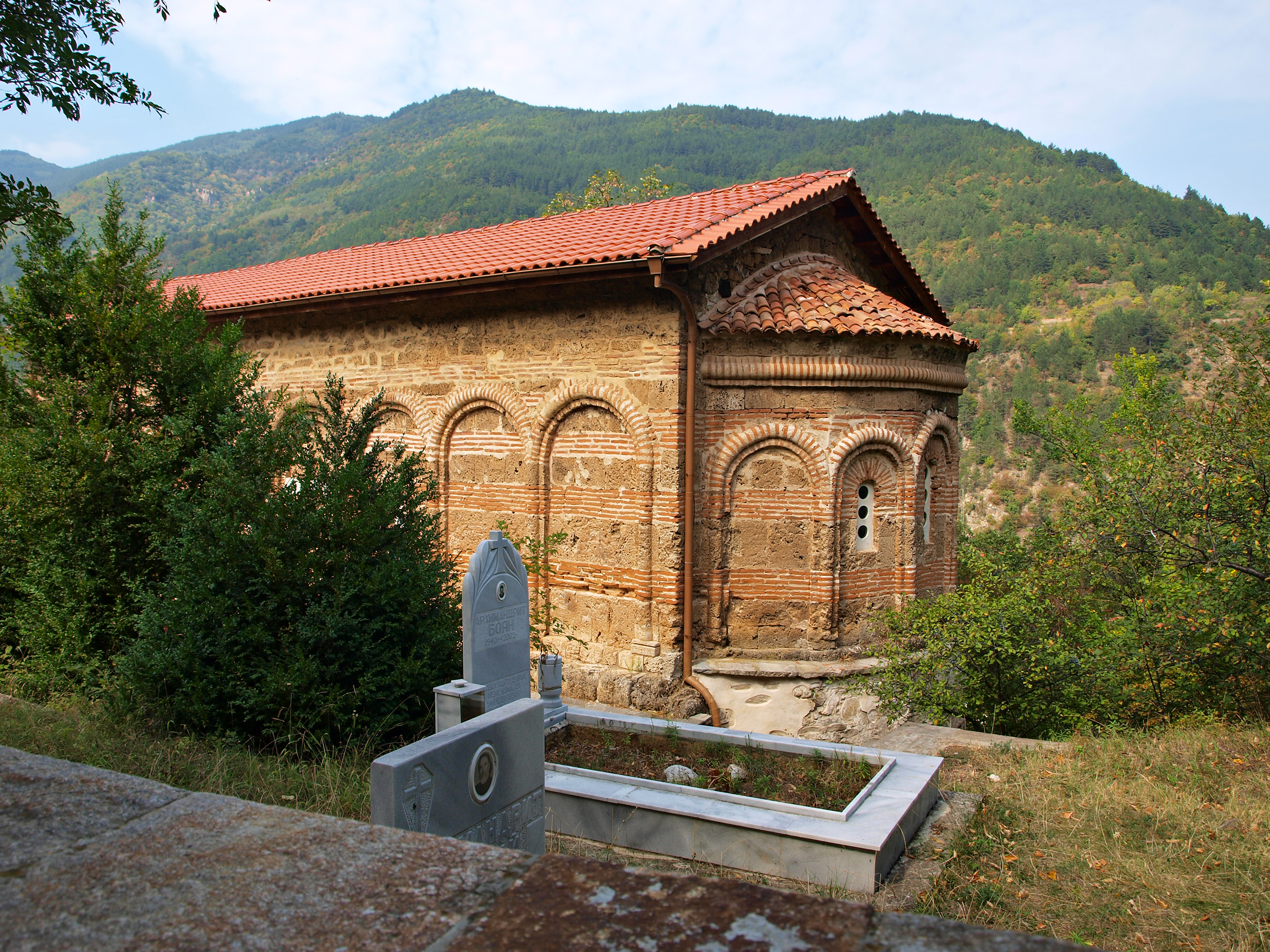
The medieval ossuary of Bachkovo Monastery

During the 13th and especially during the 14th centuries the construction of monasteries thrived. Small monasteries such as the SS Forty Martyrs Monastery as well as large monastery complexes were constructed. Due to the troubled times many monasteries resembled fortresses. They usually had rectangular shape, the buildings surrounded a yard in which the main church was located. From the outside they had high stone walls reinforced with counterforts, and from the inside there were galleries with several stores which led towards the dwellings of the monks. The monastery complexes also included farm buildings, stores and workshops. Examples of that type are the Zograf Monastery in Athon; Bachkovo Monastery near Asenovgrad or the Rila Monastery. Although destroyed several times, the overall plan of the later follows the traditions of the Second Bulgarian Empire.

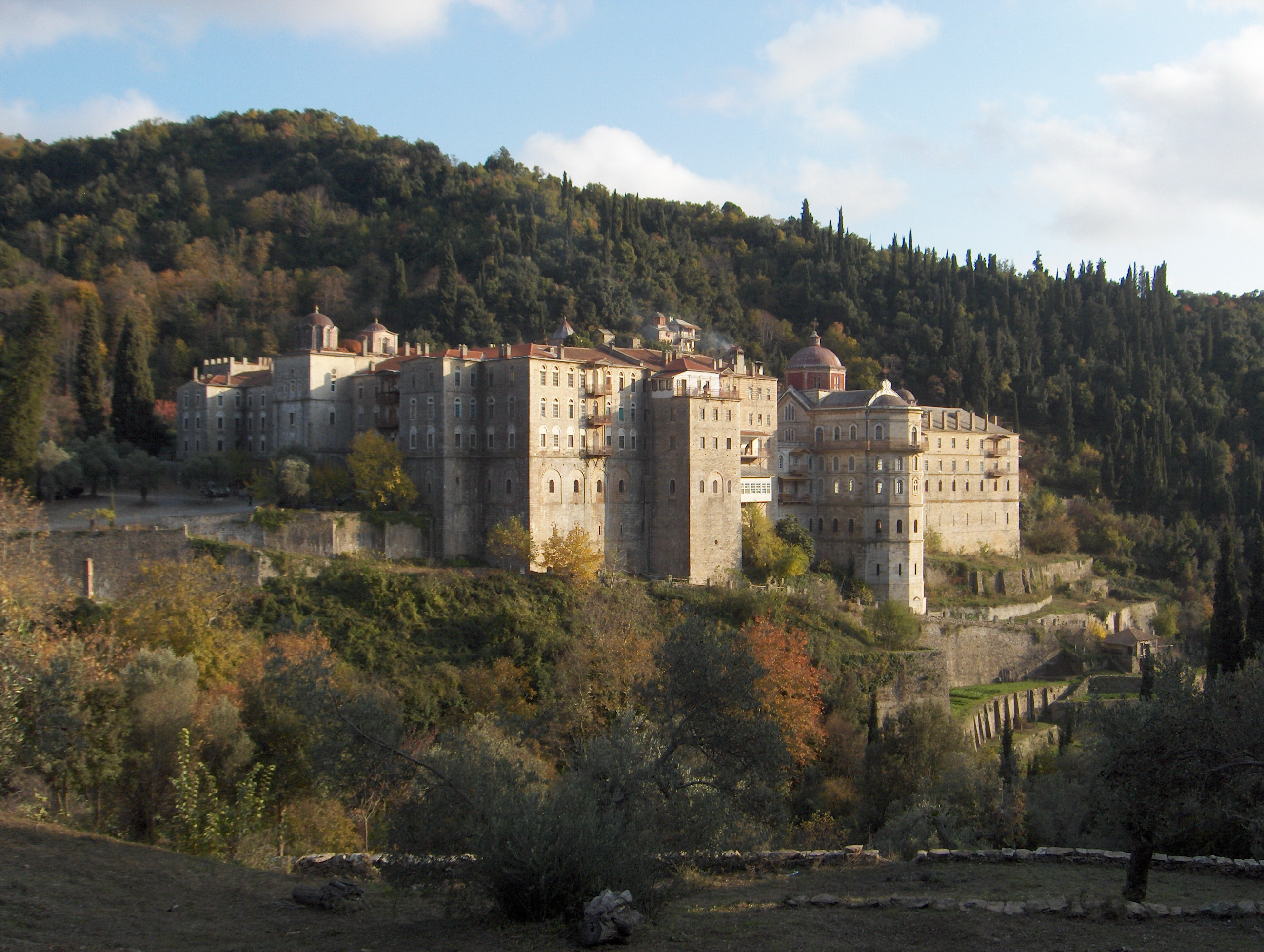
Zograf Monastery

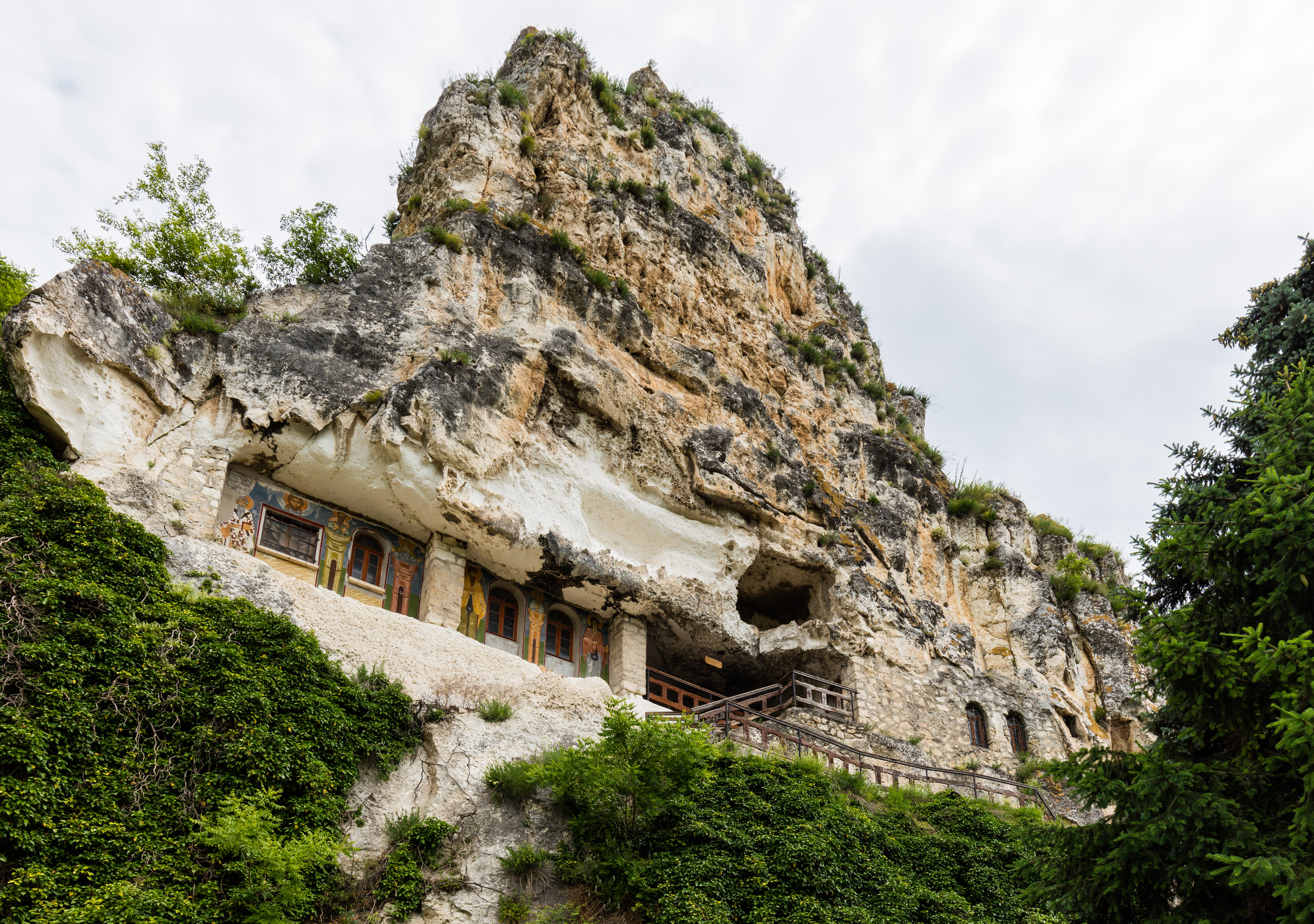
Rock-hewn Churches of Ivanovo, UNESCO World Heritage List landmark.

With the growing influence of the Hesychasm, during the 14th century the rock monasteries became widespread. The monk's dwelling and the churches were directly hewn into the rocks. Wooden balconies and stairs were added from which only the cradles in the rocks have survived. That type of monasteries were mainly built in north-eastern Bulgaria along the rivers Ruse Lom, Black Lom and White Lom.

The largest concentrations of monasteries in medieval Bulgaria were in northern Stara Planina especially around the capital; in the areas to the north and south Sofia; the southern Black Sea coast; the area around Pirot and in Macedonia. Many of these were called the small Mount Athon.

== Military architecture ==
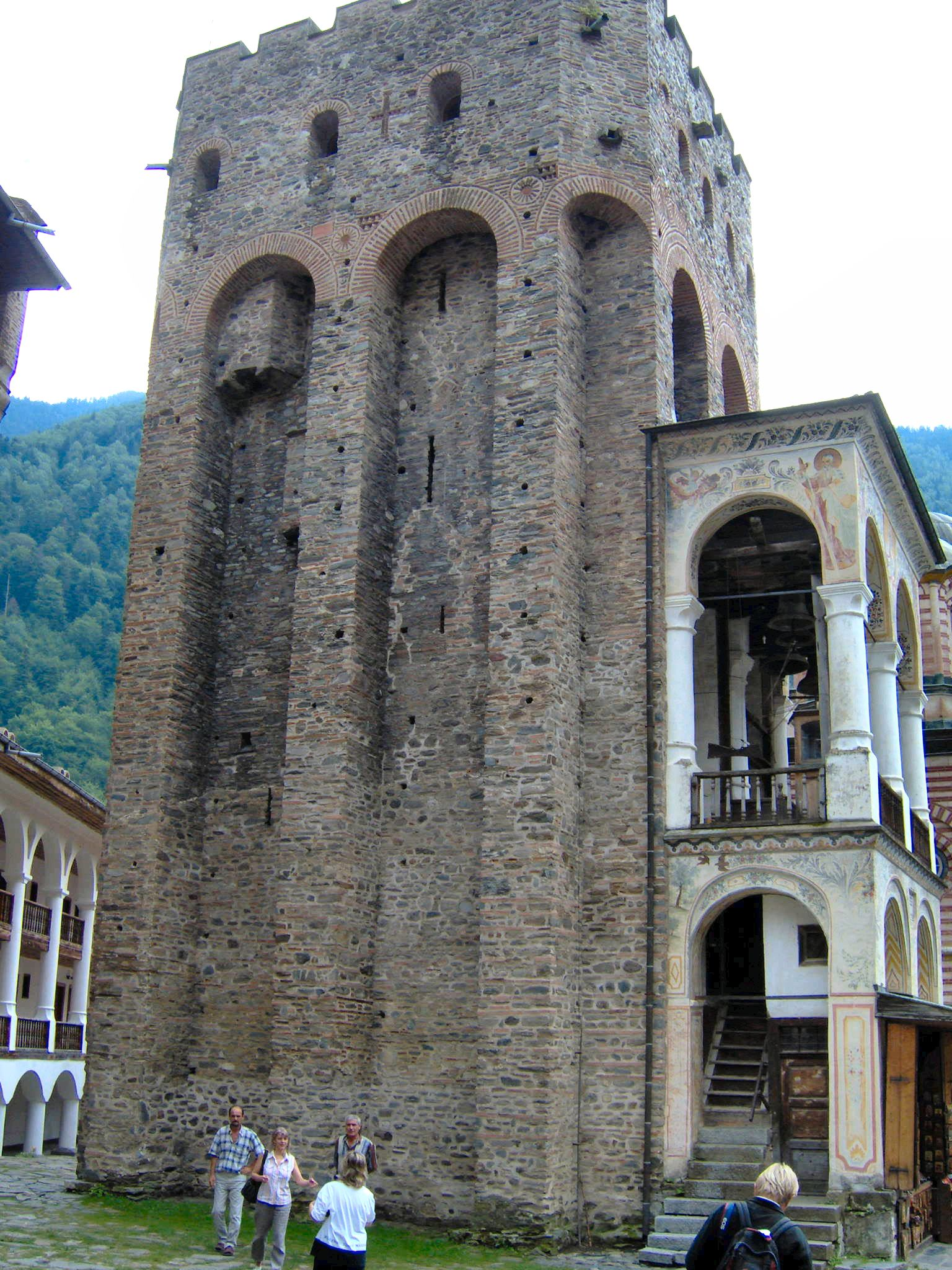
The Tower of Hrelyo, 1335 in the Rila Monastery

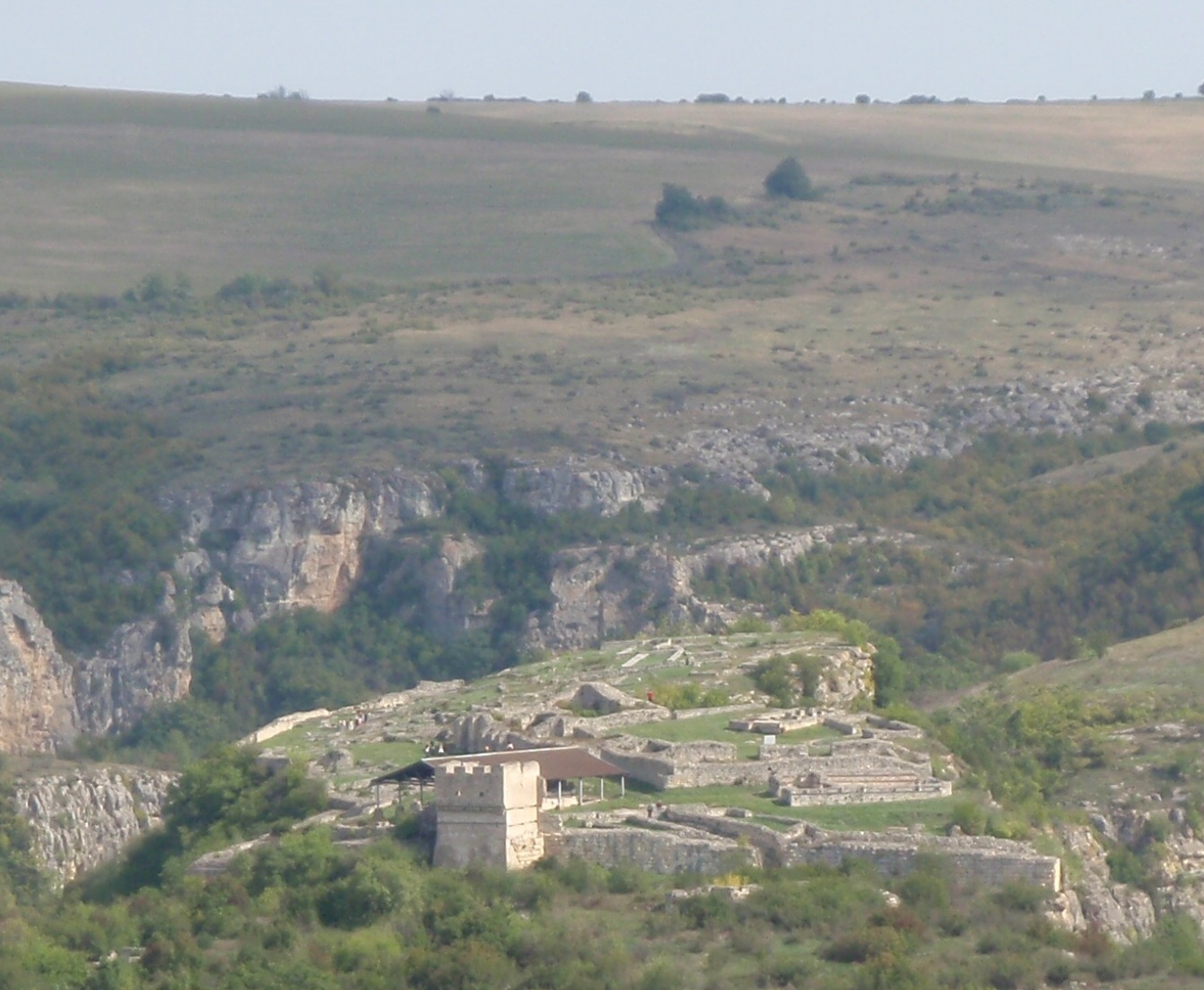
Cherven medieval fortress

During the Second Empire the fortresses were usually built on locations which were difficult to access (hills or plateaus) and thus they sharply differed from the monumental construction in the north-east of the country from the period of the First Bulgarian Empire. The walls of the fortresses were built from stones welded together with plaster; they had two faces and the space between them was filled with a mixture of gravel and plaster (blockage). A wooden scaffolding was built from the inside which protected the walls from collapse until the blockage dried up. The height and thickness of the walls varied depending on the terrain and in the different parts of one castle complex they could vary. The top of the walls and the towers had pinnacles. Counterforts were used as additional protection from landslip.

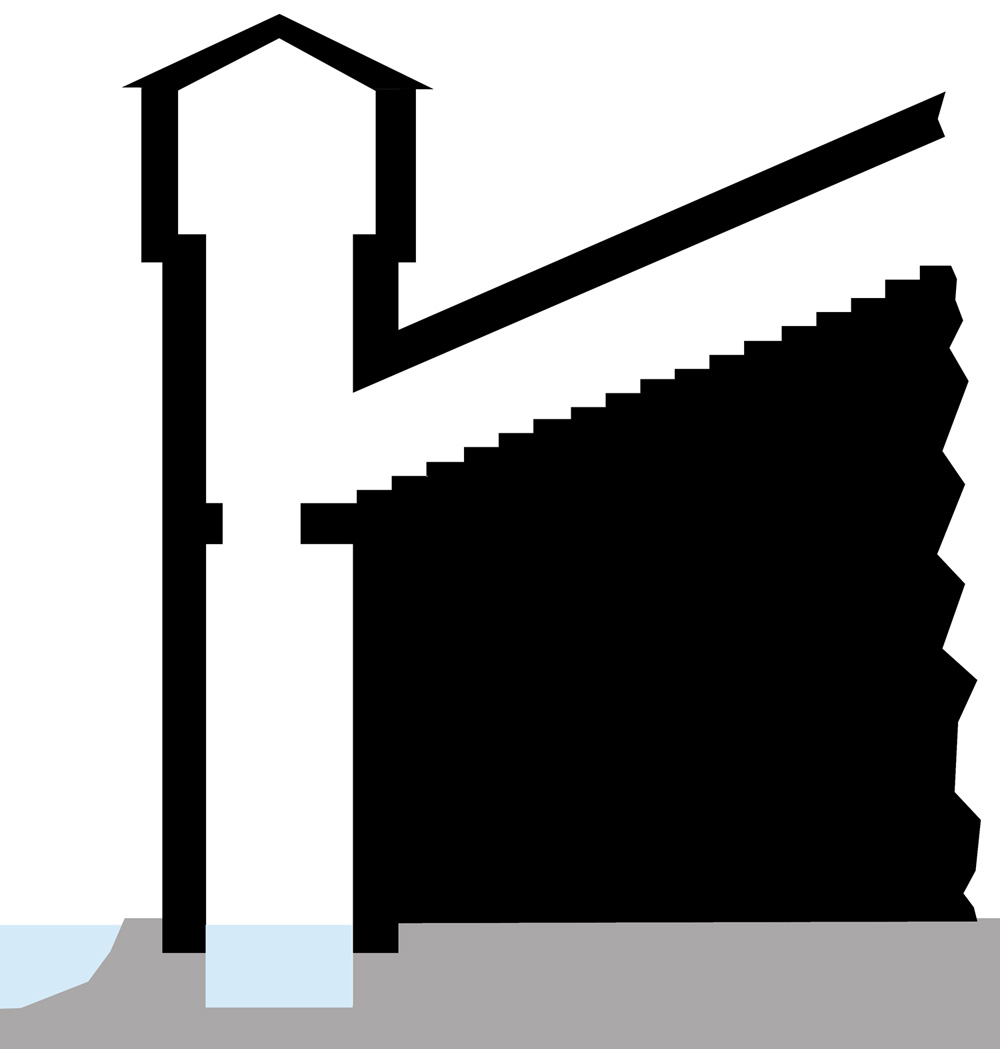
A scheme of a water tower

The tower varied in shape: square, rectangular (the tower in Cherven), circular, oval, triangular, horseshoe-shaped or with irregular shape. Depending on their position and functions they were: entrance, defense, edge or water towers. The later were towers-wells, located in the immediate vicinity of a river in such a way that their foundations soaked up water. The immense fortress Tsarevets in Tarnovo had such water towers. They could be reached by vertical walls from the main stronghold with secret galleries. They were extremely useful during long sieges. In the most difficult place to access in the fortress stood the citadel: a separate rampart in case the outer areas were overrun by the enemy. Examples of such citadels can be found in the castles of Shumen, Lovech, Cherven, Ohrid, Devol and others. As an additional defense some castles had water-filled moats. A fine example of this is Baba Vida in Vidin.

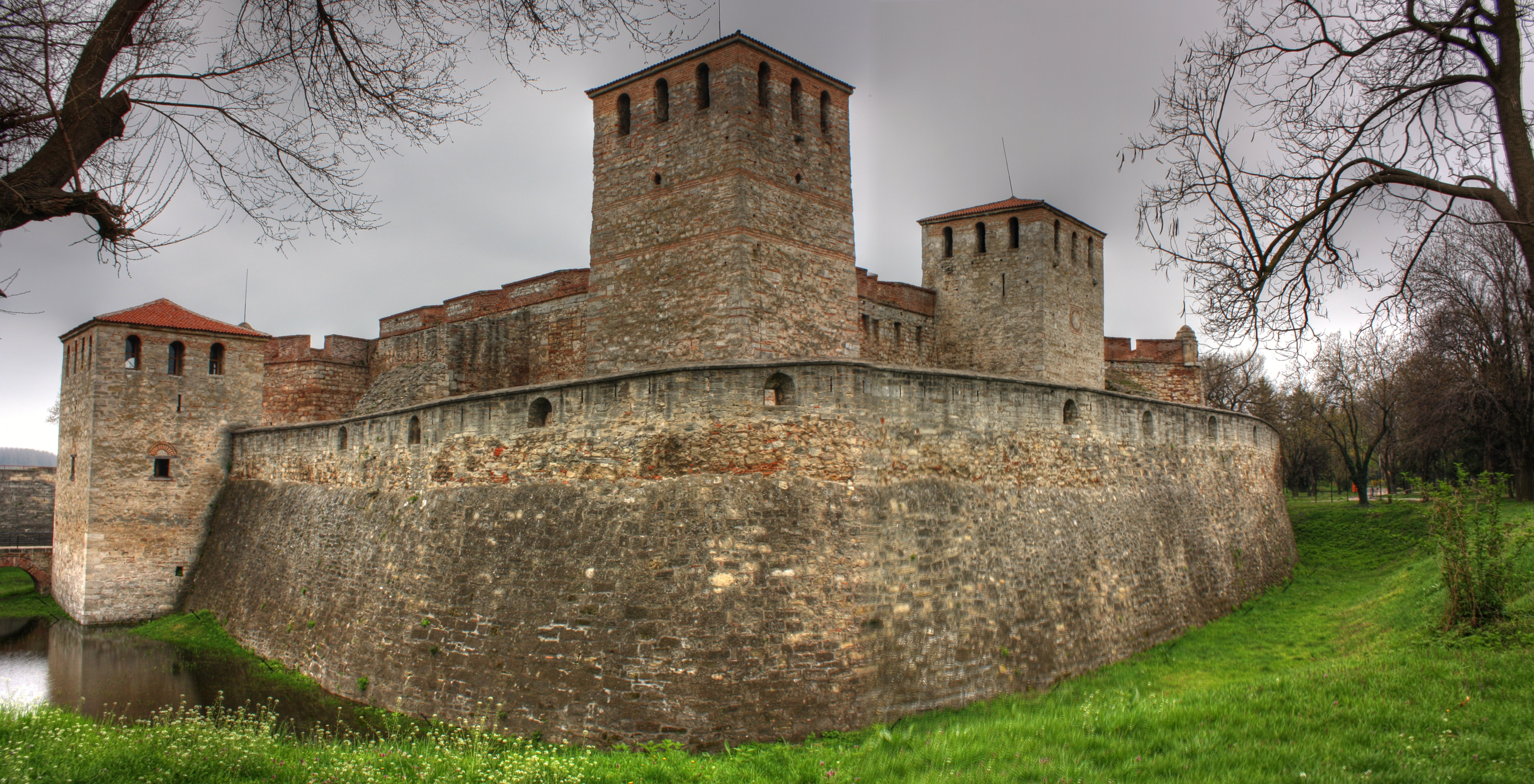
Baba Vida

In many cases such moat were of no need due to the fine positioning of the fortress. The Yantra river makes double curve around the two main fortresses in the capital Tarnovo, Tsarevets and Trapezitsa and served as a natural water obstacle. Many other castles were protected in a similar way such as Cherven or Prosek. Some seaside strongholds (Kaliakra, Nessebar) also had a natural water barrier.

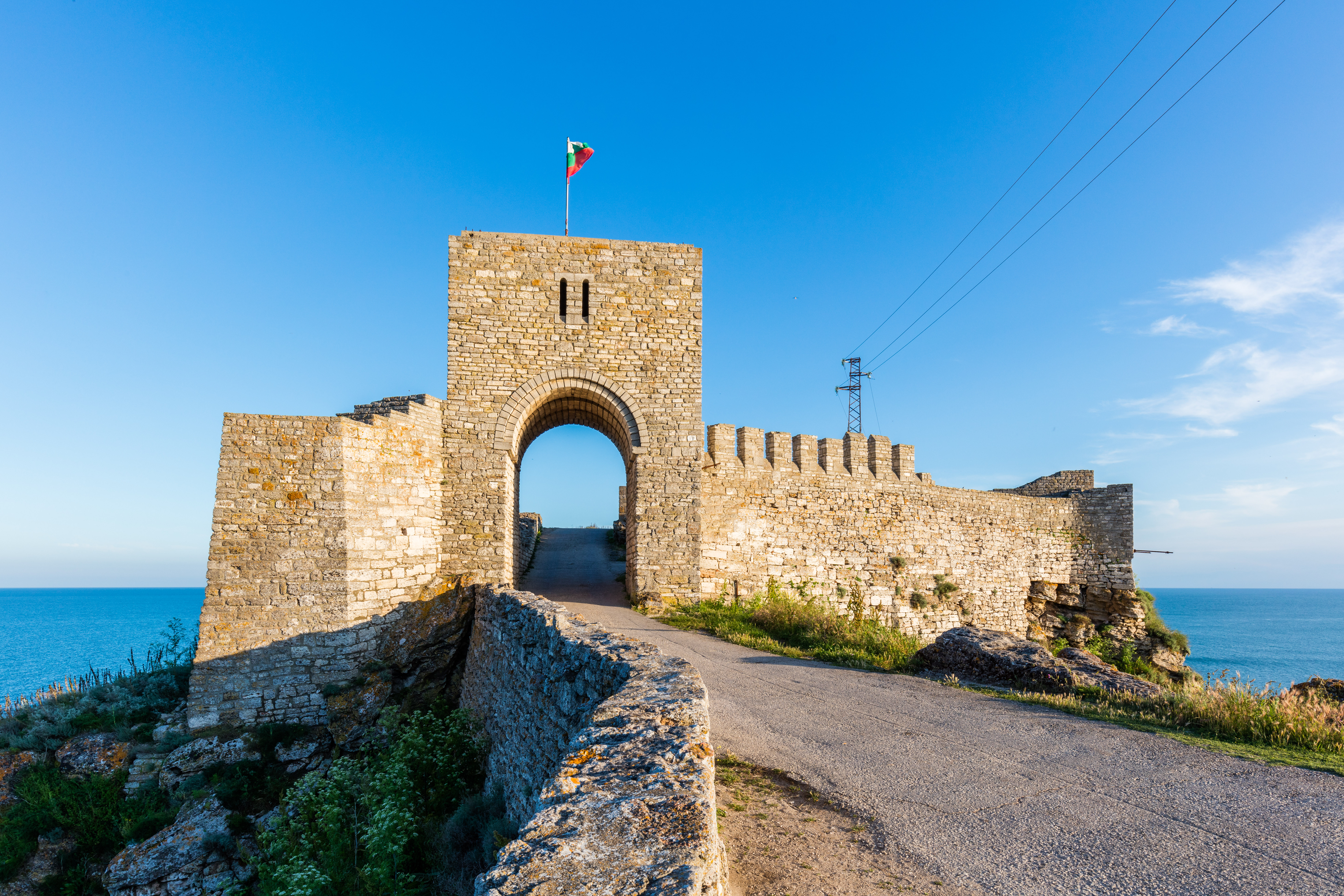
Kaliakra fortress

Sometimes the steep rocks were enough defense and walls were built only in vulnerable places. An example of such type of fortress is the Belogradchik Fortress. Often these ramparts looked like ordinary plateaus or hills and hence they were called "hidden fortresses". Many strongholds if that type guarded the mountain passes of Stara Planina between Moesia and Thrace.

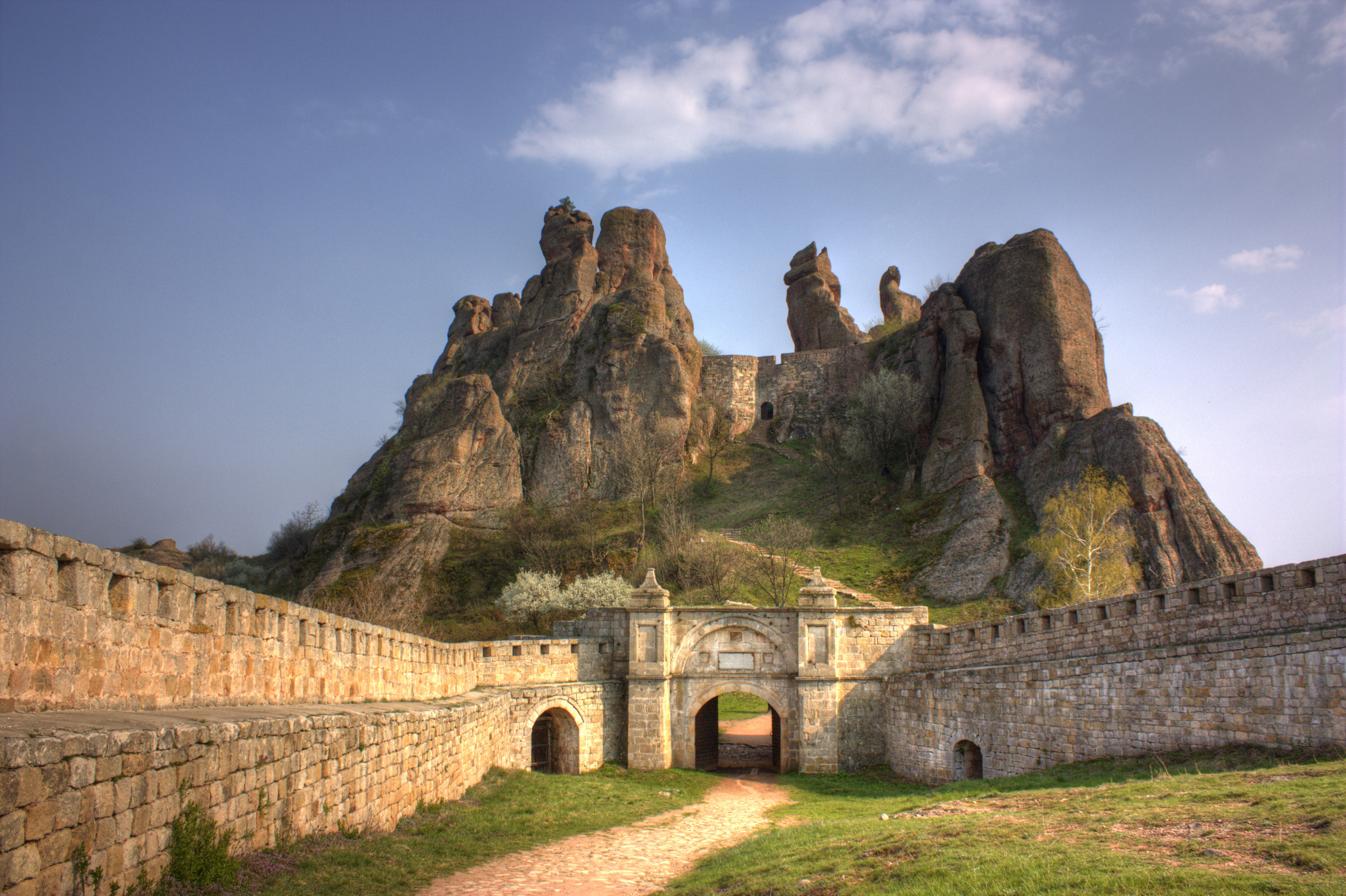
The Belogradchik Fortress

A peculiar type of defensive facility was the pirgos (a single tower) called in Western Europe dungeon. It was built inside the fortress without any links to the other edifices. It served as a last refuge for the defenders in case the other parts of the fortress had fallen. Examples for pirgos in the country are the ruins in Matochina (near the Tundzha river), the tower in the Sadovo monastery and the Tower of Hrelyo in the Rila monastery built in 1335 which is completely preserved. It is 23,60 meters high and has five storeys. A cellar is located in its foundations. There was also a well which supplied the defenders with fresh water during sieges. Reinforced counterforts supported the tower. They merge with brick arches and serve as a base for the Transfiguration of God Chapel located at the top of the tower. Most of the pirgos usually had four or five storeys. In the monastery pirgos the most valuable objects (the treasury and the donations) were kept as well as the library.

Military architecture had purely functional purpose. The builder did not follow aesthetic criteria and rarely constructed decorative elements on the fortifications. In fact many castles were part of large defensive systems which covered the frontier regions or ran along the middle of the country. The most important fortification systems were along the Danube to the north, Stara Planina in the Middle, Black Sea to the east, the Rhodopes to the south and Macedonia to the south-west. Apart from the capital Tarnovo, the major Bulgarian fortresses included Vidin, Silistra, Shumen, Cherven, Lovech, Sofia, Plovdiv, Lyutitsa, Ustra, Ohrid, Skopie, Bitola and many others.

== Palace construction and urban planning ==
Map of medieval Tarnovo

The defensive system of Tarnovo was impressive. The Medieval capital had three fortified hills: Tsarevets, Trapezitsa and Momina Krepost (Devingrad). Numerous monasteries nestled on the Sveta Gora heights. Between the hills were situated several neighbourhoods: the New City (Asenova mahala); the quarter of the foreign merchants (Frazgrad) and the Jew quarter; they were all surrounded by walls. The palaces of the emperors and the patriarch were located on the most heavily fortified hill, Tsarevets and both resembled a small citadel in way.

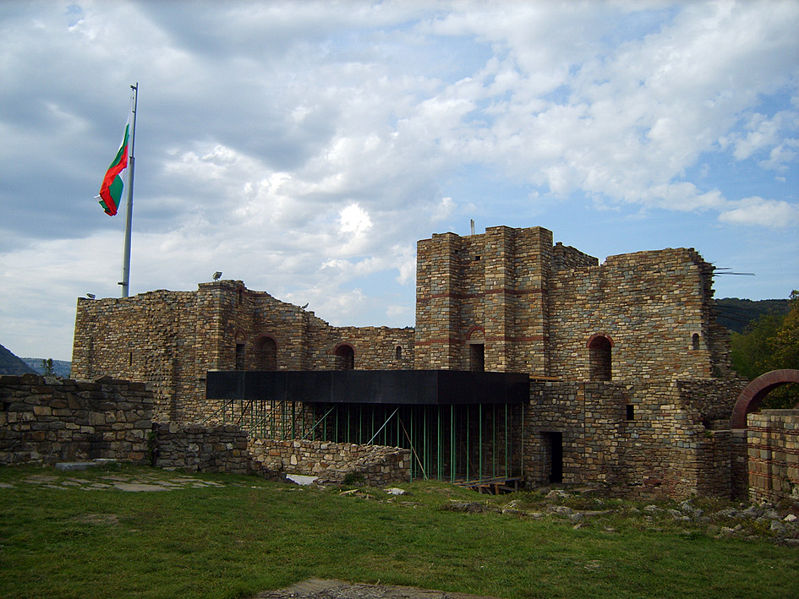
The ruins of the Royal Palace in Tarnovo

The Imperial Palace was initially a bolyar castle and underwent two major reconstruction under Ivan Asen II (1218–1241) and Ivan Alexander (1331–1371). In its final appearance it was a small fortress with approximately oval shape. The thickness of its walls reached two meters. The entrance gates were guarded by round and rectangular towers, the main entrance was located in the round tower of the northern facade. The north-western edge tower was particularly massive. From the inside the edifices were built around an inner yard with richly decorated royal church in the middle. Due to the rugged terrain some buildings had two and others had three storeys.

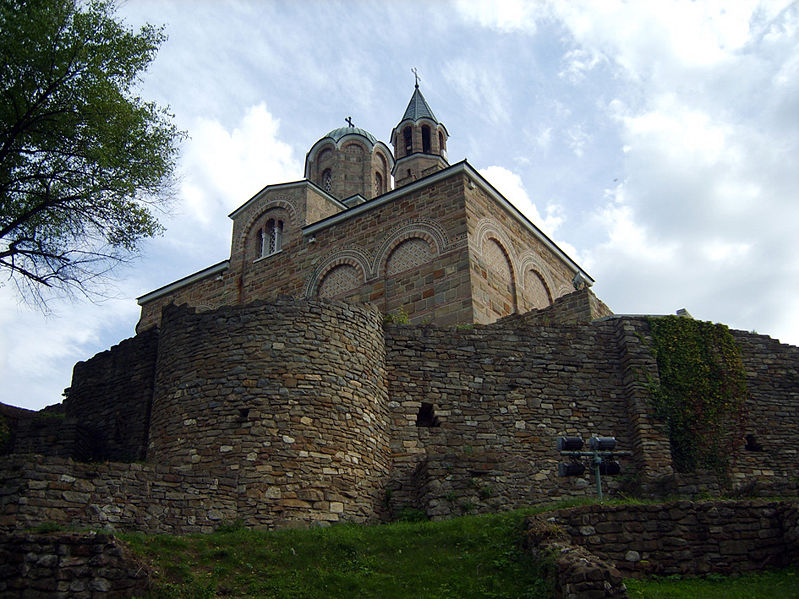
The Patriarchal Cathedral of the Holy Ascension of God in the Patriarch Palace

The Patriarch Palace rising on the highest point of Tsarevets dominated the city. Its plan resembled those of the Imperial Palace. Thick walls surrounded the patio in which the cruciform dome Ascension of God Church was situated. The foundations of two round towers have been excavated one in the northern and the other in the southern parts of the palace. The main entrance was in the western rectangular tower. A four-cornered bell-tower was adjoined to the Patriarchal Cathedral of the Holy Ascension of God whose architecture design is unique for South-eastern Europe. The residential and office sections were located in the southern part.

The construction of the palaces was from stone soldered with plaster. Large stone blocks were used only in some places unlike the buildings from Pliska and Preslav. From the outside they had austere and monumental appearance. For the imposing edifices the architects used mixed construction methods and decorative elements similar to those from the churches. Unfortunately due to the heavy damage they suffered, it is not possible to be restored the overall appearance of the palaces for certain. Some premises were richly decorated with mosaics and mural paintings and probably served for audiences and Royal apartments. The use of stone inscriptions from Antiquity which were embedded into the walls was characteristic of the architecture of the Tarnovo School of Architecture. Most of them came from the ancient Roman town of Nicopolis ad Istrum located at 18 km to the north of Tarnovo. That feature impressed the Bulgarian Catholic archbishop Peter Bogdan who wrote an interesting description of Tsarevets in 1640.

On the hill there were also shops, workshops, warehouses and dwelling which probably belonged to the craftsmen and the servants. The narrow streets were covered with cobbles. The foundations of churches, water tanks and bolyar houses have been excavated. The walls which are 12 meters high follow the crown of the hill. The main gate was situated in the western section of the fortress and was defended by a complex fortification which included three towers, three gates and a drawbridge above the steep cliffs. Tsarevets had five more gates. There were also secret underground passages. Below the heights, along the river was built a second wall ring which surrounded the hill. In the vicinity of the Great Lavra monastery were discovered the foundations of a stone bridge which spanned over the Yantra river.

In a similar way was organized the defensive system of the other large hill Trapezitsa. It was surrounded by thick walls and many tower and had six gates. The foundations of a pirgos and 17 churches have been found during excavations.

During the 13th and 14th centuries Tarnovo had around 30,000 inhabitants and was the second largest city in the Balkan Peninsula after the Byzantine capital Constantinople.

== Residential architecture ==
The abodes during the Second Bulgarian Empire can be generally separated into two major types depending on the social status of their inhabitants.

=== Bolyar houses ===
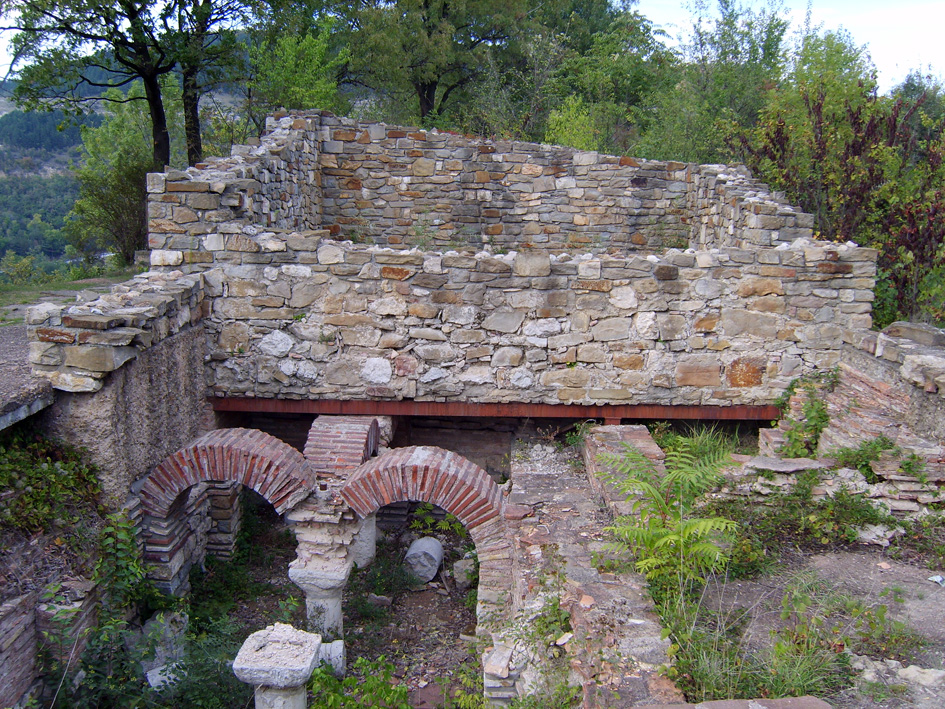
A bolyar house, Tsarevets

The general type of the bolyar houses between the 13th and 14th centuries is difficult to determine because of the lack of enough architecture data. To the north of the Royal Palace in Tsarevets were excavated the foundations of a bolyar house from the beginning of the 13th century. Its general plan was Г-shaped and consisted of residential and economic part. High stone walls closed the yard from the other sides. The residential edifice had two floors. The first floor was built of stone and separated into three identical rooms, the middle of which looked towards the yard; there was the door. The marble bases of the two columns which supported the second floor and parts of the staircase have been preserved. The second floor was with bow-windows and the room in the middle was probably open-air. The economic section had one floor and was segmented into several parts and had veranda looking to the yard. In the south-western edge are visible the foundations of a small family church with one nave. The bolyar house in Melnik has a similar plan and is also dated from the 14th century.

=== Mass dwelling ===
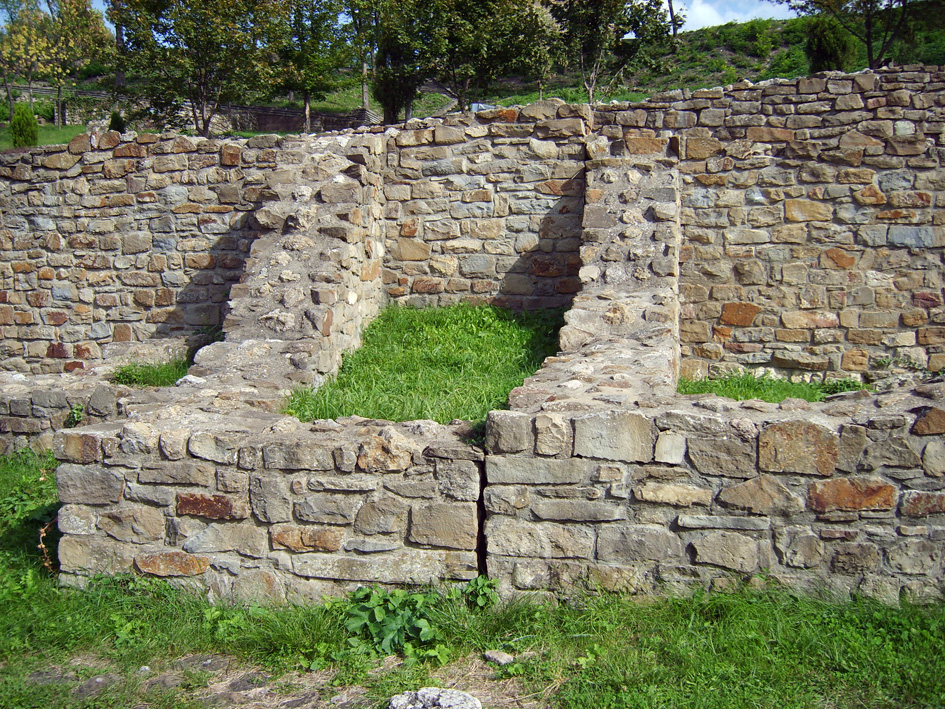
Foundations of overground houses in Tarnovo

From the Second Bulgarian Empire there are basically two types of mass dwellings: semi-dug houses (semi dug-out) and overground houses. The semi-dug dwelling can be also divided into two types: evenly dug in (around 150 cm) and dug in inclined terrain, in that cases the rear was fully under the ground and the front was exposed. The first type was built with timber and covered with straw or reed. Similar dwellings were known from the First Bulgarian Empire too. The second type of houses were built of stones soldered with mud (in the parts over the ground) and the roof was made of timber. The depth of dug-in reached two meters and the door was from the exposed part. The floor was covered with bricks or plastered up with clay. A furnace was used for heating and the smoke came out from an opening on the roof. Such dwellings are found in the western slopes of Momina Krepost and on the slopes of the Tsarevets hill. These houses had a very slow evolution, their root were from 8th to 12th century and continued to be used during the period of the Ottoman domination. A variety of that type are the semi-dug houses built entirely of stone which had a second floor. The most common type of houses in the Medieval Bulgarian towns were the overground houses. Their ruins have been found in Tarnovo, Shumen, Lovech, Cherven. They were usually with two storeys and one or two rooms. They were built on a previously leveled ground closely adjoining each other and were usually without yards. They were built of stones soldered with mud or plaster. The roof was probably made of timber. Their inhabitants were probably craftsmen or servants of the aristocracy. The ground floors were used for shops and workshops.

== See also ==
- Art School of Tarnovo
- Painting of the Tarnovo Artistic School
- Tarnovo Literary School
- Golden Age of medieval Bulgarian culture
- Pliska-Preslav culture
