= Church of Christ Pantocrator, Nesebar =

Church building in Nesebar, Bulgaria

Church of Christ Pantocrator Църква "Христос Пантократор"
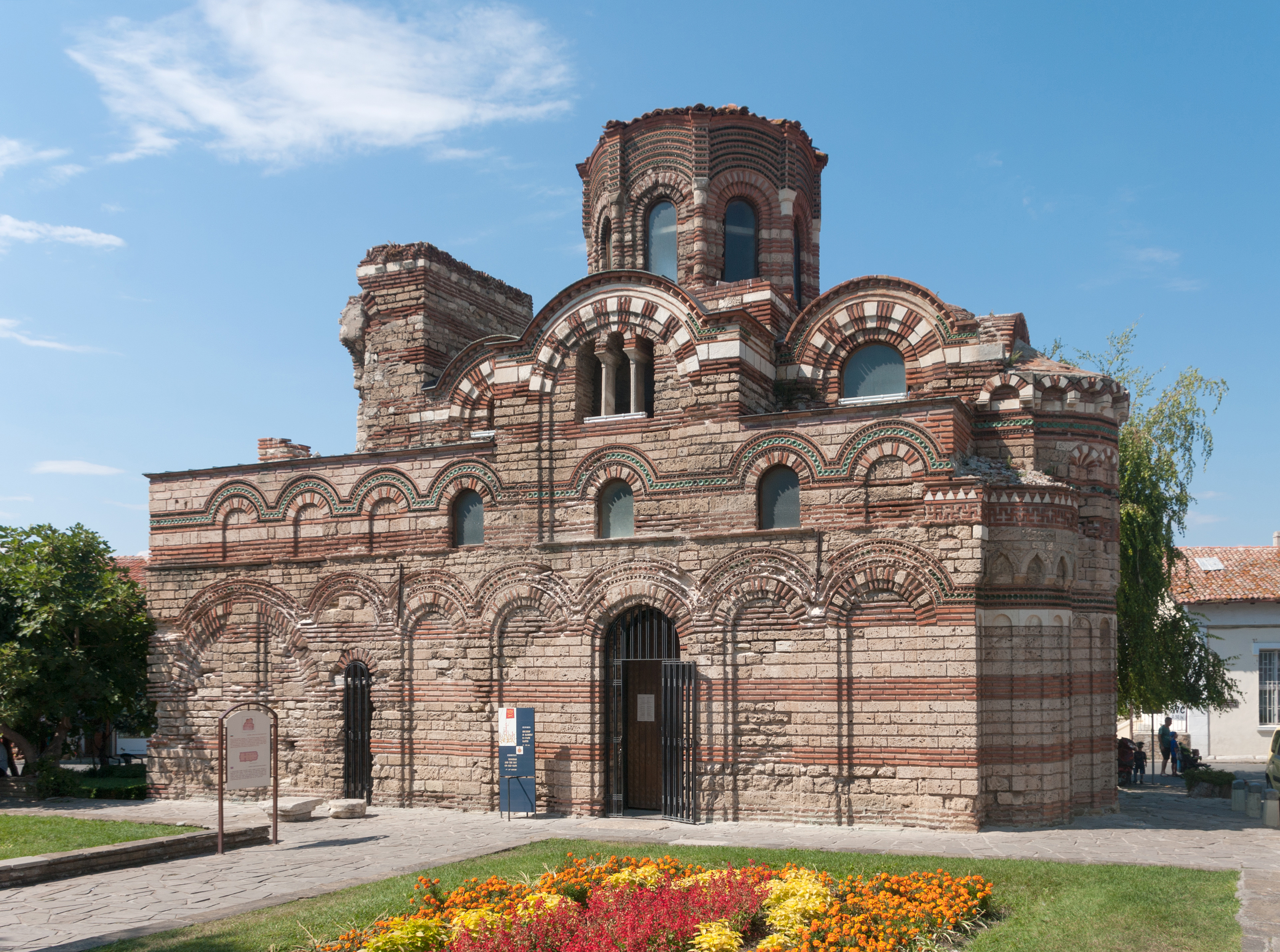
- South view of the Church of Christ Pantocrator

Religion
- Affiliation: Eastern Orthodox

Location
- Location: Nesebar, Bulgaria
- Interactive map of Church of Christ Pantocrator; Църква "Христос Пантократор"
- Coordinates: 42°39′31″N 27°44′0″E

Architecture
- Type: Church
- Completed: 13th-14th century

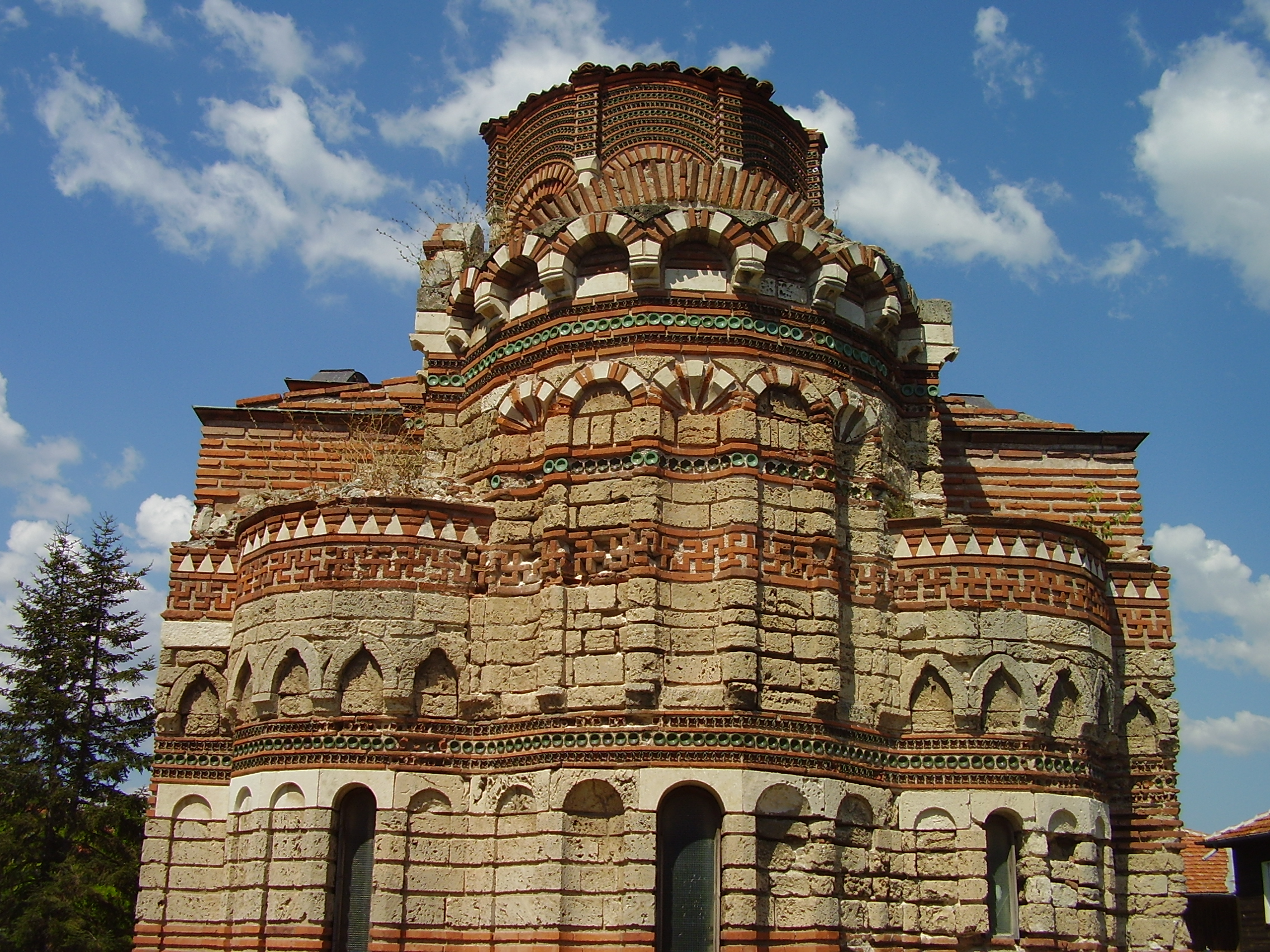
View of the elaborately decorated apse from the east

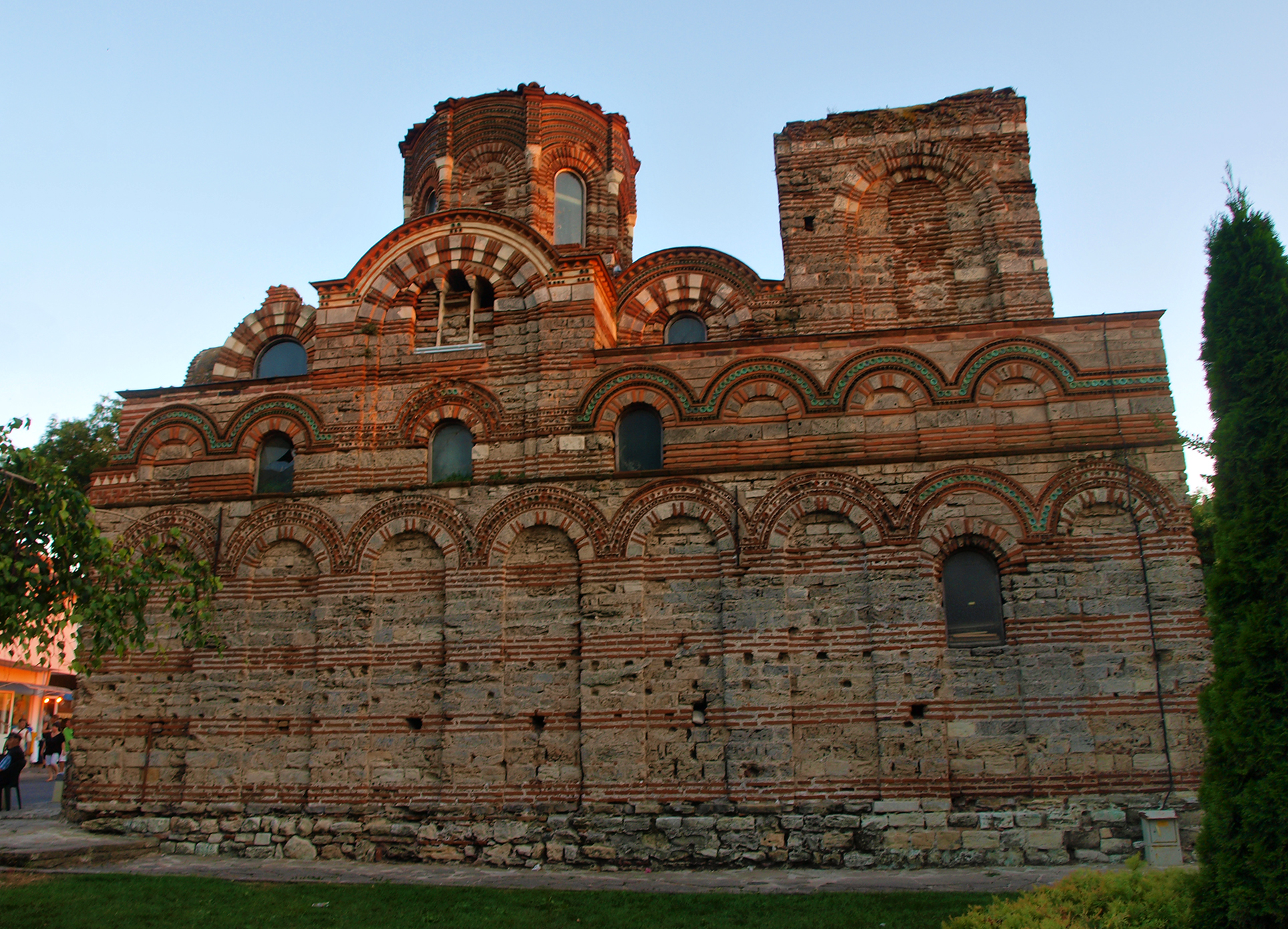
North facade

The Church of Christ Pantocrator (Bulgarian: църква „Христос Пантократор“, romanized: tsarkva „Hristos Pantokrator“ or църква „Христос Вседържател“, tsarkva „Hristos Vsedarzhatel“, 'Church of Christ Omnipotent'; Byzantine Greek: Ναός Χριστού Παντοκράτωρος) is a medieval Eastern Orthodox church in the eastern Bulgarian town of Nesebar (medieval Mesembria), on the Black Sea coast of Burgas Province. Part of the Ancient Nesebar UNESCO World Heritage Site, the Church of Christ Pantocrator was constructed in the 13th–14th century and is best known for its lavish exterior decoration. The church, today an art gallery, survives largely intact and is among Bulgaria's best preserved churches of the Middle Ages.

== History ==
The Church of Christ Pantocrator is usually dated to the late 13th or early 14th century. University of Pennsylvania scholar Robert G. Ousterhout places its construction in the mid-14th century. Rough Guides author Jonathan Bousfield attributes its building to the rule of Tsar Ivan Alexander of Bulgaria (r. 1331–1371), though during this time control of Nesebar changed many times between the Second Bulgarian Empire and Byzantium. The church is dedicated to Christ Pantocrator, a name of God which hails him as the "Ruler of All" in Greek.

The church is located on Mesembria Street, near the entrance to Nesebar's old town. Nowadays, it houses an art gallery which exhibits works by Bulgarian artists. As it belongs to the old town of Nesebar, the Church of Christ Pantocrator forms part of the Ancient City of Nesebar UNESCO World Heritage Site and the 100 Tourist Sites of Bulgaria. Since 1927, it has been under state protection as a "national antiquity", and it was listed among Bulgaria's monuments of culture of national importance in 1964.

== Architecture ==
The church is designed in late Byzantine cross-in-square style. It was constructed from stones and brickwork, a construction technique known as opus mixtum, and measures 16 by 6.90 metres (52.5 ft × 22.6 ft), 16 by 6.70 metres (52.5 ft × 22.0 ft), or 14.20 by 4.80 metres (46.6 ft × 15.7 ft), depending on the source. The walls of the church are 0.80 metres (2.6 ft) thick. The colour of the bricks gives the church a ruddy appearance.

The church features a narthex and a cella (or "naos") with an essentially rectangular elongated plan. The narthex is small, but has a medieval tomb underneath it. There are four entrances to the church: two accessing the cella from the south and west, and another two for the narthex from the west and north. The apse of the church has three small parts which overlap each other to form a single, larger unit. The prothesis and diaconicon of the church are located by the apse.

The dome, octagonal in shape, stands prominently on top of the centre of the cella. It was supported by four now-destroyed columns which were located directly beneath it. The integrated bell tower has been built on top of the narthex, as was customary in contemporary Byzantine church architecture, and extends from the rectangular main structure. The bell tower was originally rectangular, though it is now partially ruined. It was reached from the south by means of a stone staircase.

== Decoration ==
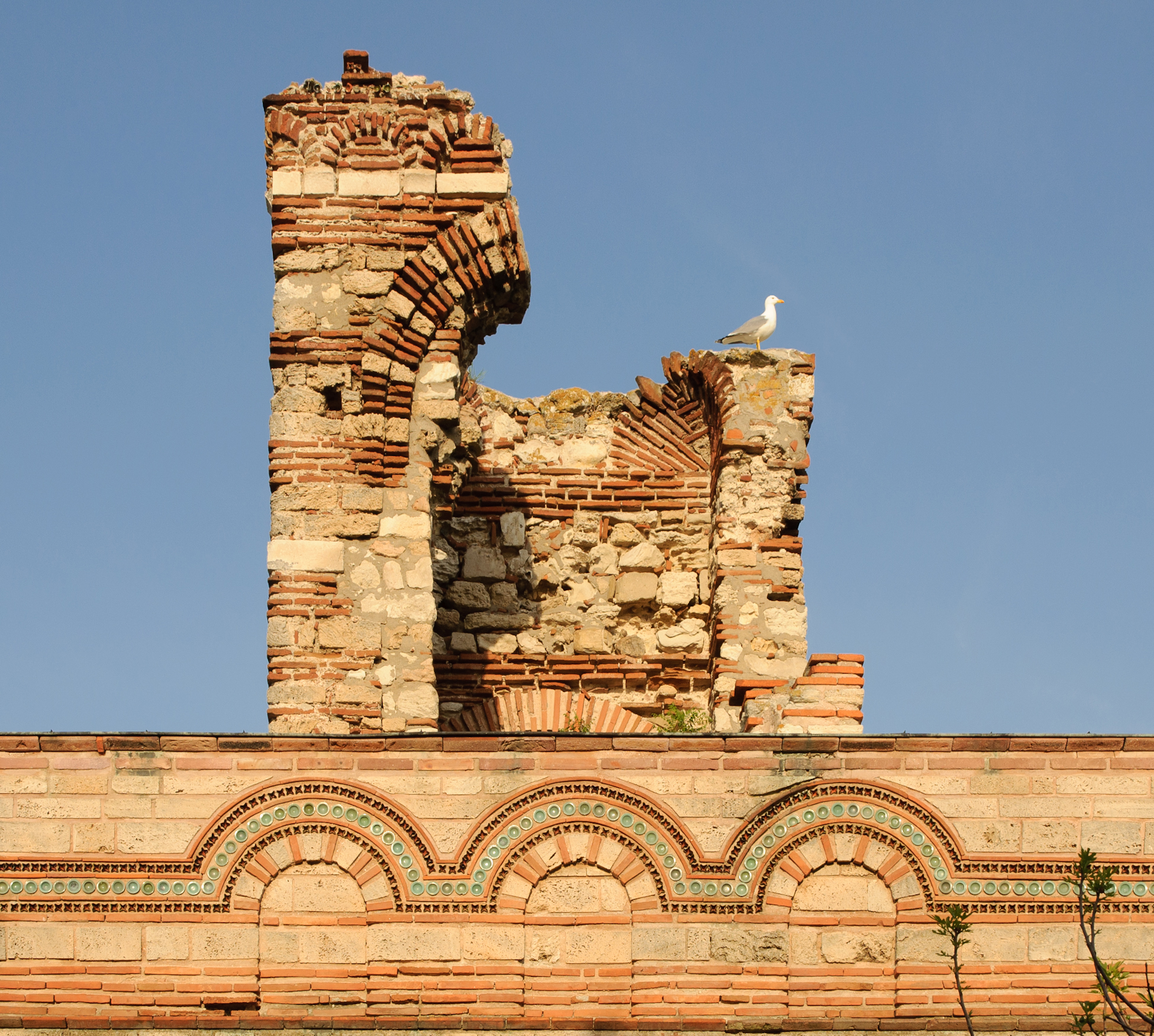
Details of the west facade.

The best-known feature of the Church of Christ Pantocrator is the rich and colourful decoration of its exterior walls. The most lavishly decorated part of the church is the east side with the apse, and as a whole all sides of the church exhibit different ornamentation. Interchanging strips of three or four rows of bricks and carved stones, which create an optical pattern, are the most basic type of decoration used. Rows of blind arches, four-leaved floral motifs, triangular ornaments, circular turquoise ceramics and brick swastika friezes run along the east wall. Ousterhout likens the appearance of the church's superimposed arcades to an aqueduct; an earlier example of that configuration can be observed in the Cappadocian church of Çanlı Kilise near Aksaray, Turkey. The inclusion of swastikas in the decoration is considered unusual and curious to tourists. It is explained by the medieval use of the swastika as a symbol of the Sun.

The decoration of the elongated north and south walls includes brick blind arches in the bottom part and a large arch for each wall adjacent to the dome with a columned window in the middle. There are windows above the lower arches of the north and south facade. The dome, which also exhibits a large number of ornamental details and ceramics, features eight windows, one for each of its sides. The medieval frescoes which were painted on the interior walls of the church have been only fragmentarily preserved.
