= Church of Saints Peter and Paul, Veliko Tarnovo =

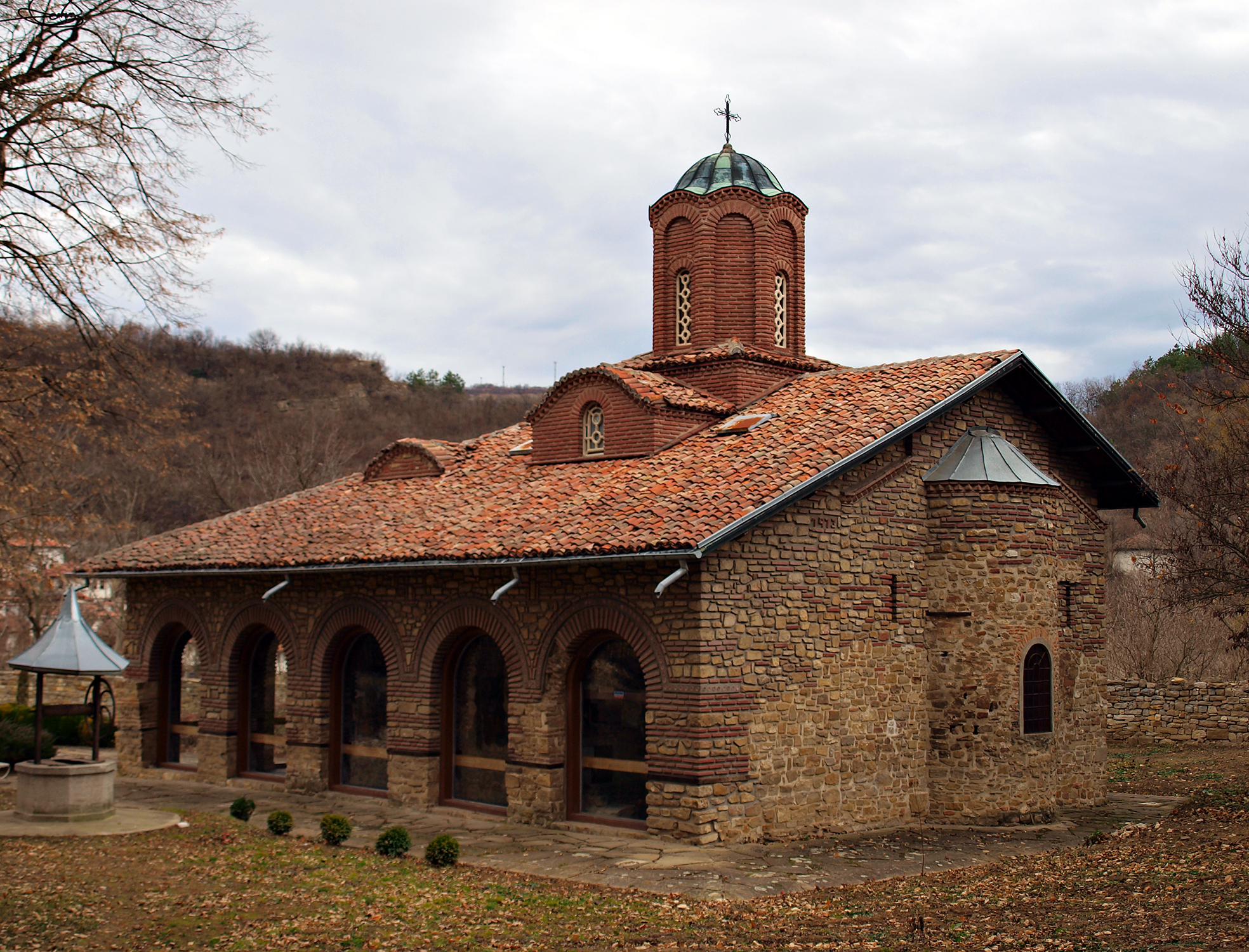
- Church of Saints Peter and Paul in Veliko Tarnovo, Bulgaria
- Church of Saints Peter and Paul, Veliko Tarnovo
- 43°5′16″N 25°39′6″E
- Country: Bulgaria
- Denomination: Bulgarian Orthodox

The Church of Saints Peter and Paul (Bulgarian: църква "Св. св. Петър и Павел", tsarkva "Sv. sv. Petar i Pavel) is a medieval Bulgarian Orthodox church in the city of Veliko Tarnovo in central northern Bulgaria, the former capital of the Second Bulgarian Empire. The 13th-century church lies at the foot of the Tsarevets hill's northern slopes and was reconstructed in 1981.

The church is dedicated to the Christian Apostles Saint Peter and Saint Paul. It follows the cross-domed design and has a single apse. The cella is divided into three naves by two rows of columns. The columns' capitals are decorated with plastic carving and tracery. The church has a high, massive iconostasis. According to the 14th-century account of Patriarch Evtimiy, the church and the surrounding monastery were built on the order of Tsar Ivan Asen II's (ruled 1218–1241) wife Anna.

After the Fall of Tarnovo to the Ottomans in 1393, the church may have become the seat of the Bulgarian Patriarchate for a brief period. It continued to be a metropolitan bishop's residence of the Ecumenical Patriarchate of Constantinople during the Ottoman rule. The bishop Hilarion of Crete was buried there and his tombstone has been preserved.

Three layers of frescoes inside the church have been preserved to this day. The earliest layer consists of three images of the martyrs of Edessa in the western arch dating to the mid-13th century. The second layer is the images in the narthex; it is stylistically influenced by the Italo-Cretan school from the time of the Council of Florence in the 1430s. The local bishop Ignatius took part in the council and may have propagated the idea of ecumenism. The inscriptions of the second layer are in Bulgarian and Greek. The latest layer of frescoes is that of the images in the southern gallery from the 16th century.

== Gallery ==
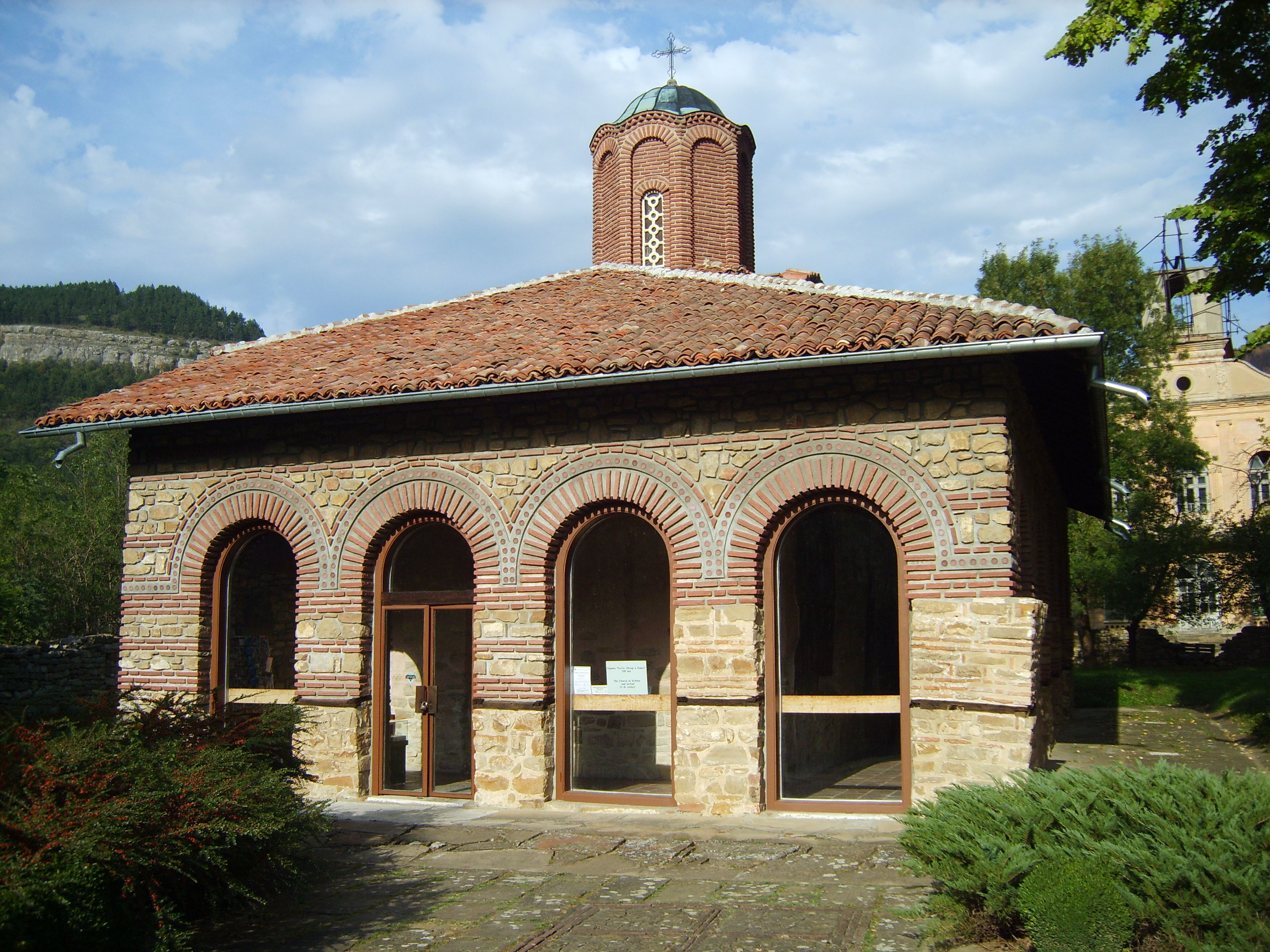

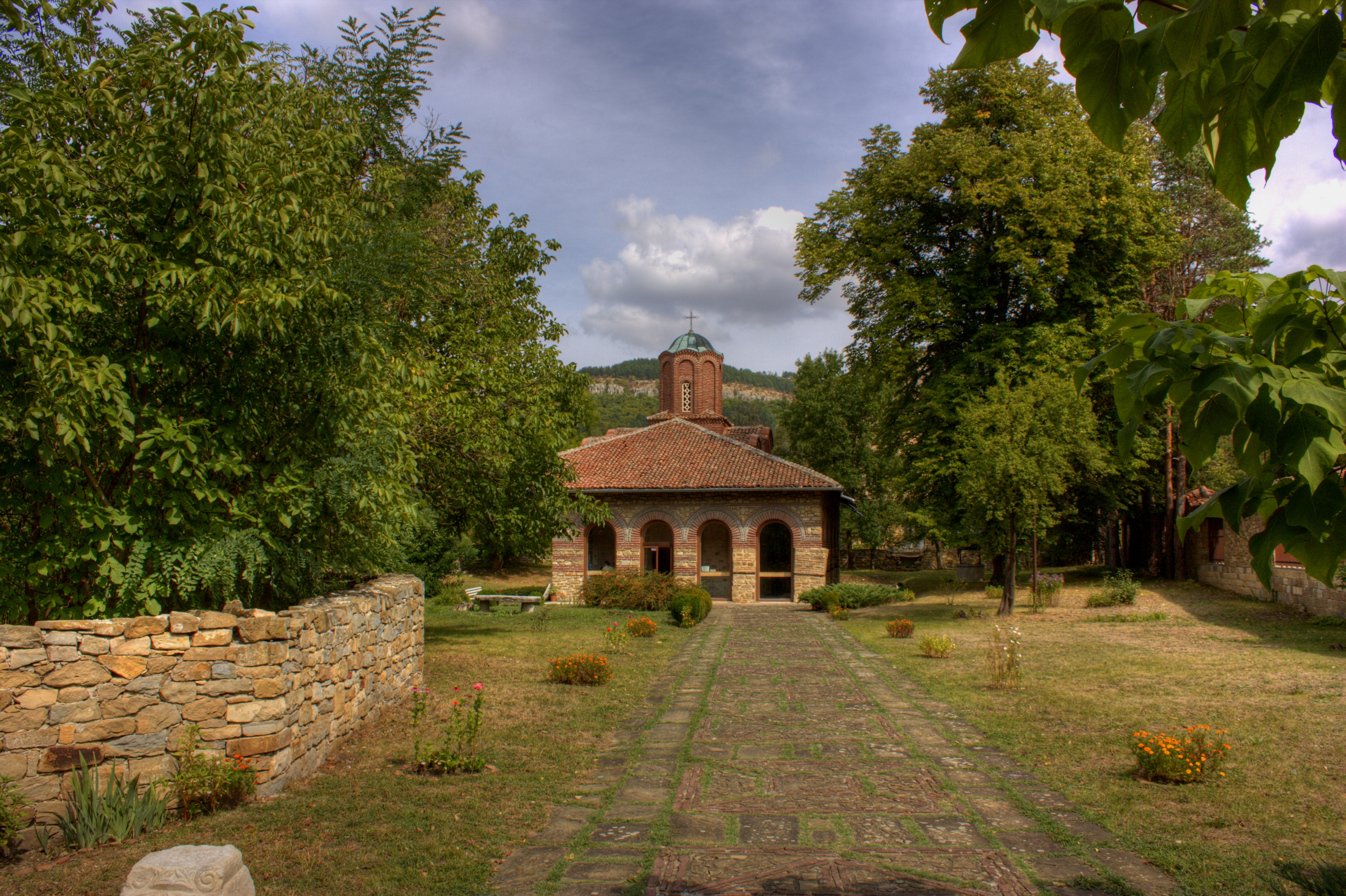

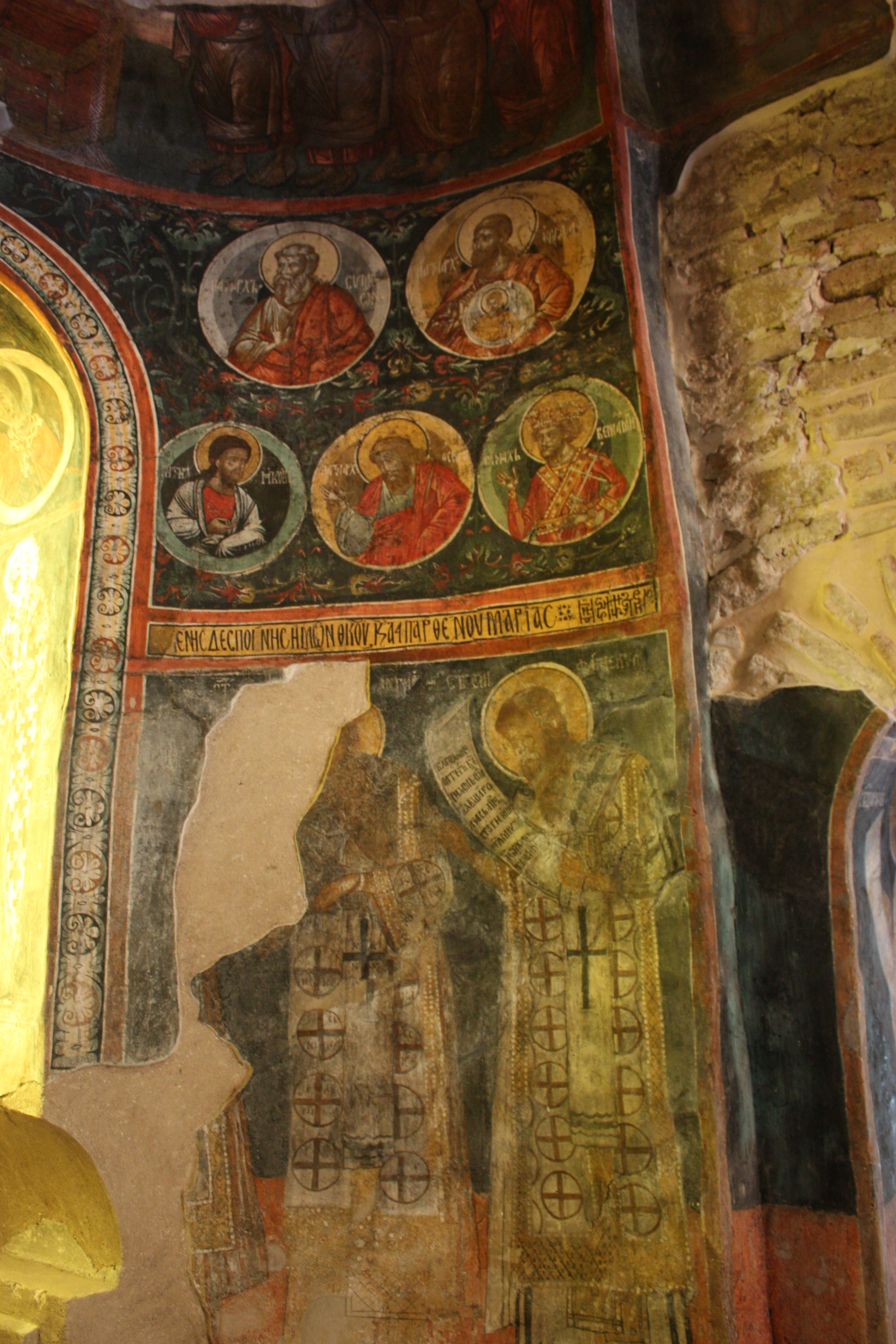

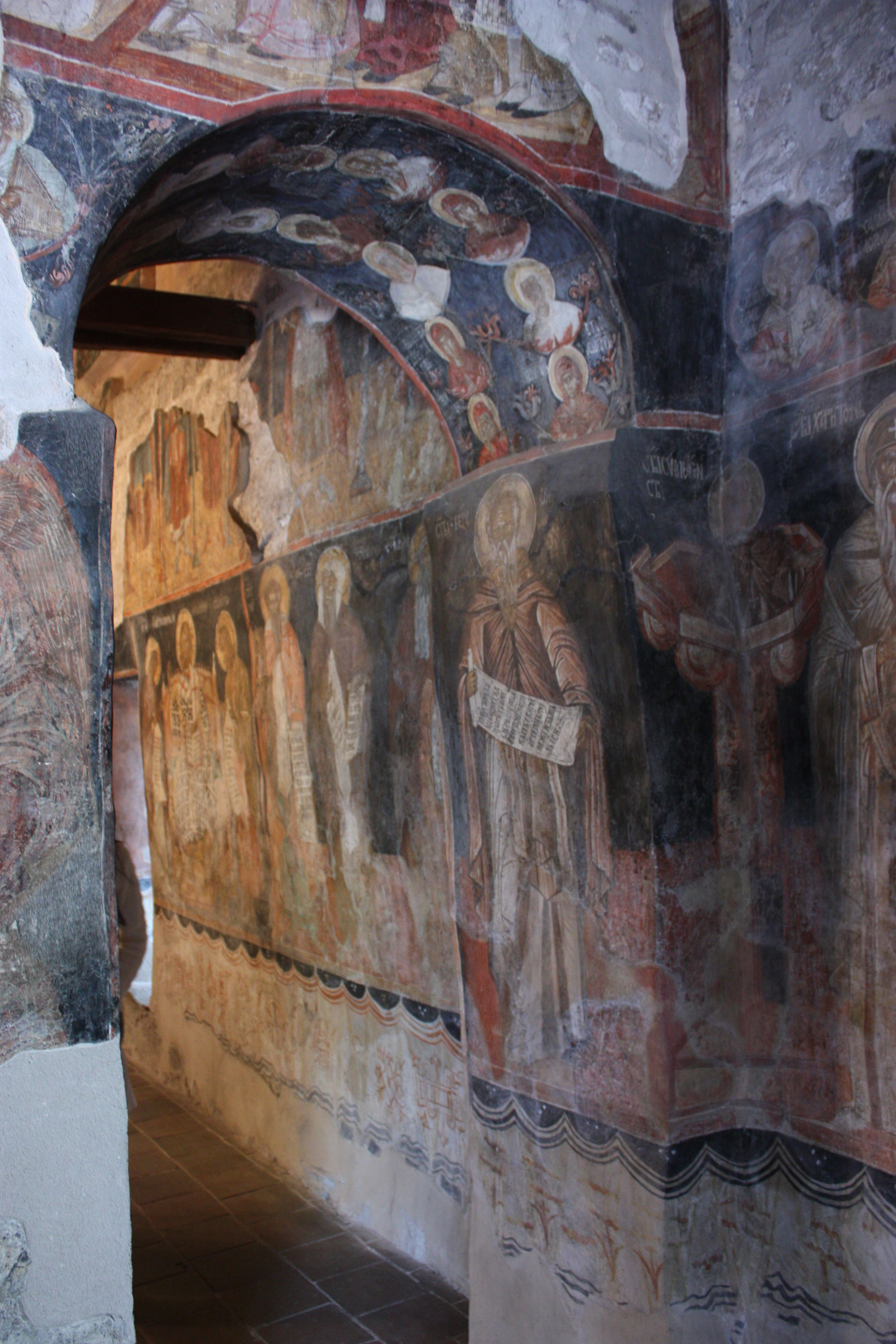

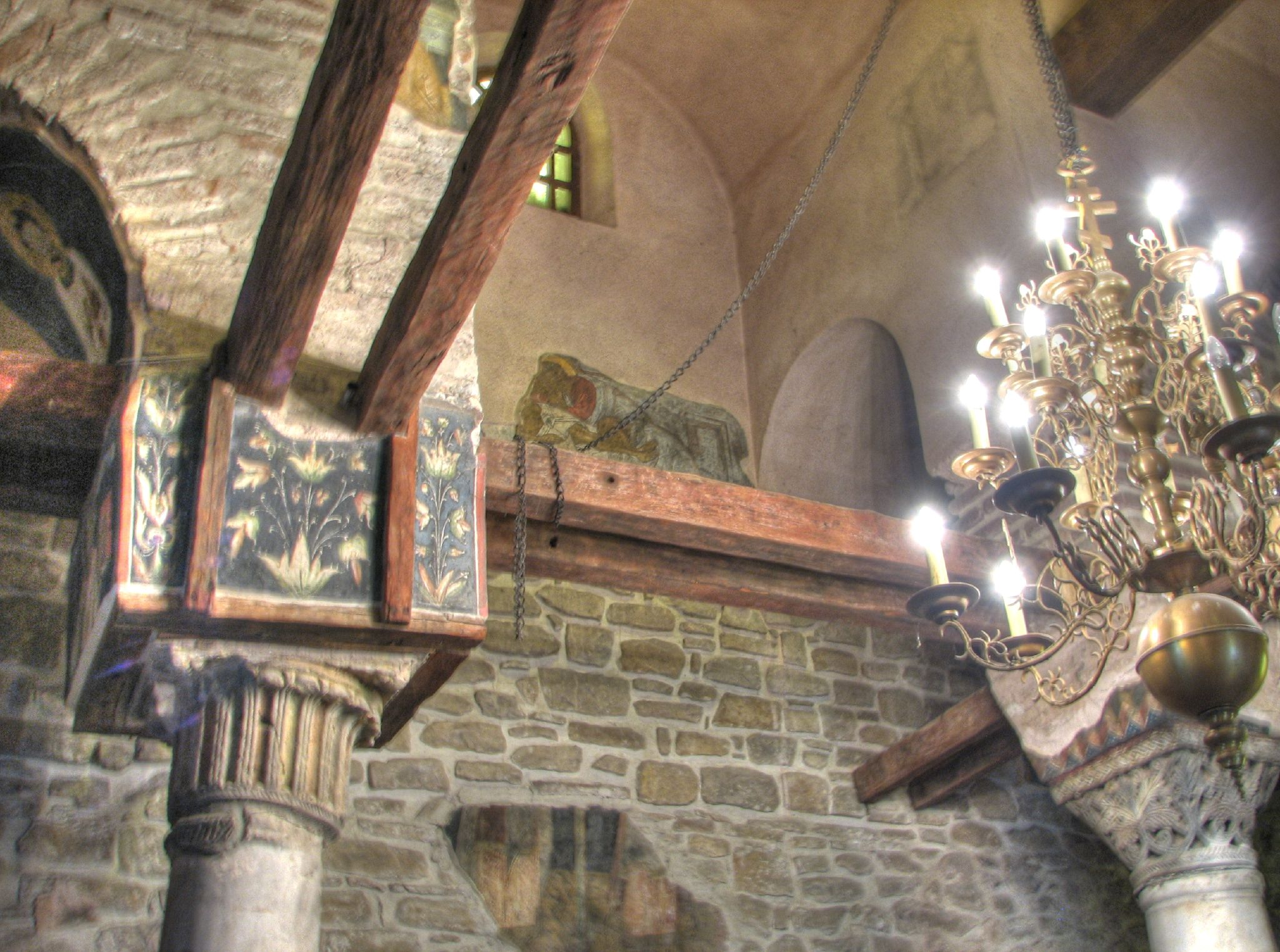

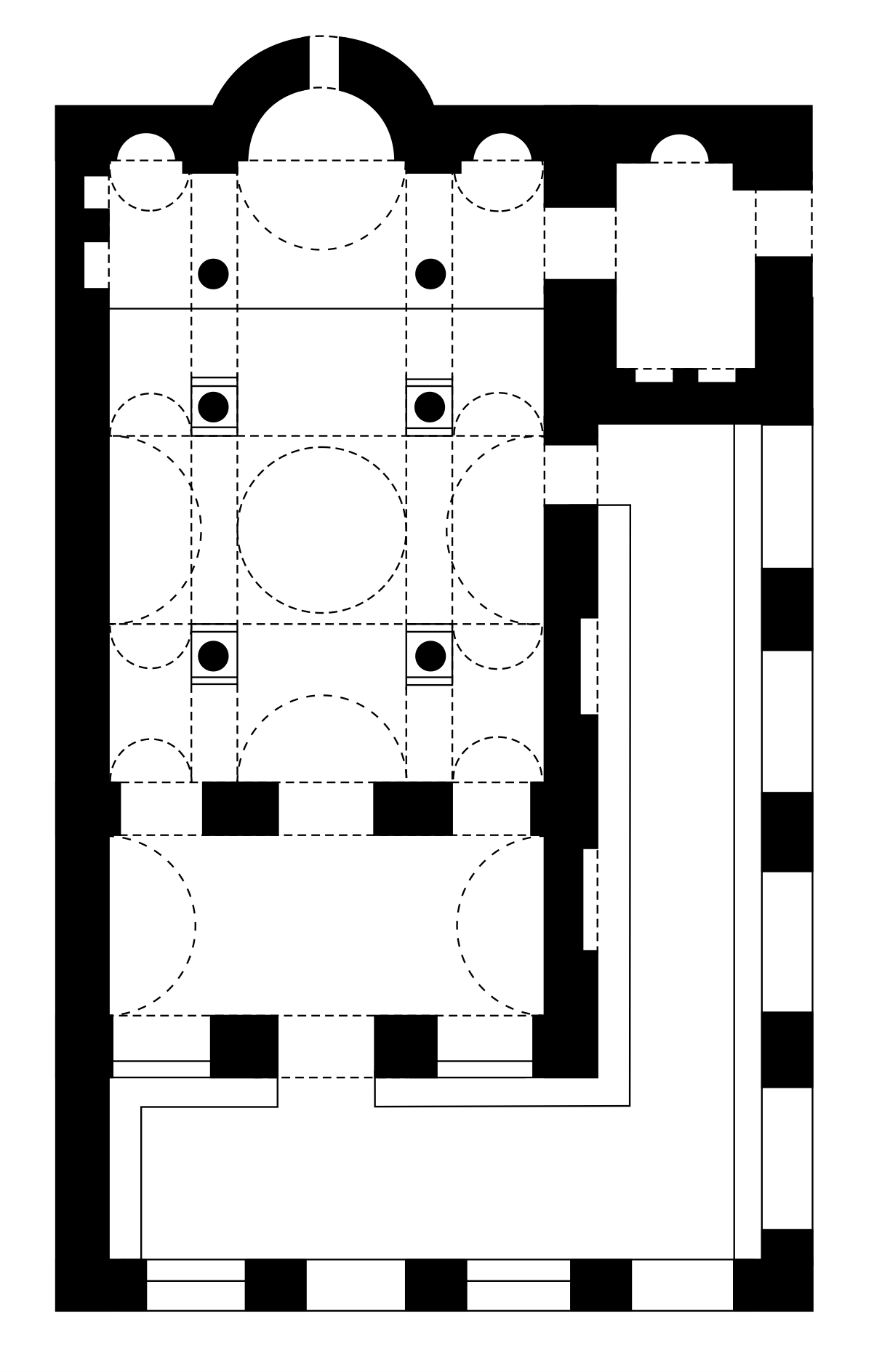
