= Belene (disambiguation) =

Belene may refer to one of the following places in Bulgaria:

- Belene, a town in Pleven Province
  - Belene Municipality
  - Belene Island on the Danube river
  - Belene labour camp, former forced labour camp
  - Belene Nuclear Power Plant, former planned nuclear power plant
