= Caritas Bulgaria =

Social welfare and humanitarian relief organisation of the Catholic Church in Bulgaria

- Национална Католическа Федерация Каритас - България
- Каритас България
- Established: 1 July 1993; 32 years ago (established) — 15 May 1995; 30 years ago
- Founder: Episcopal Conference of Bulgaria
- Type: Association
- VAT ID no.: 831717723
- Purpose: social services
- Location: Sofia, Bulgaria
- Coordinates: 42.6954°N 23.3366°E
- Official language: Bulgarian
- Emanuel Patashev: Bishop Rumen Stanev
- Affiliations: Caritas Europa, Caritas Internationalis
- Website: caritas.bg/en/

Caritas Bulgaria (Bulgarian: Каритас България) or officially the National Catholic Federation Caritas - Bulgaria (Bulgarian: Национална Католическа Федерация Каритас - България) is a not-for-profit social welfare organisation in Bulgaria. It implements social activities in support of vulnerable people in society and is a service of the Bulgarian Catholic Church.

The main objectives of Caritas Bulgaria are to coordinate and support the activities of its regional organisations (also named "Caritas"), represent Caritas before the Bulgarian State and maintain relations with partners from abroad. Caritas Bulgaria is a member of both Caritas Europa and Caritas Internationalis.

== History ==
After the political changes in Bulgaria in 1989 and the subsequent end of the People's Republic of Bulgaria in 1990, trucks carrying humanitarian aid from the Netherlands, Austria, and Germany began arriving in the country. The Eucharistic Sisters in Sofia, led by Sister Agnesa Slavova, worked with representatives from the Catholic charity organisations Caritas in these countries. In Bulgaria, the sisters organized and managed the distribution of donations throughout the country. Over time, these activities were taken over by other groups from the parish of the Assumption of the Blessed Virgin Mary in Sofia.

In 1991, the first Caritas organisation in Bulgaria was established at diocesan level in Plovdiv with the aim of expanding the social activities of the church. The first activities included distributing bread to socially disadvantaged people and delivering medicines and medications to Plovdiv hospitals.

In June 1992, Bishop Samuel Dzhundrin of the Ruse diocese leveraged his contacts in France to establish a charitable organisation within his diocese. The support of the newly arrived Passionist Fathers was particularly valuable. This initiative provided medicines to the ambulance and hospital in Ruse. Recognizing the need to strengthen Caritas structures in Bulgaria, Caritas Europa coordinated efforts in the early 1990s. Caritas Austria supported the setting up and development of a diocesan Caritas in Sofia, while Caritas France supported the Caritas structure in Plovdiv, and Caritas Switzerland Caritas Ruse.

On 1 July 1993, the Episcopal Conference established Caritas Bulgaria, and a founding conference for the National Catholic Federation was held on 8 July 1993. Sixty delegates from dioceses participated, adopting the organisation's statute. Nadka Girgincheva, then chairwoman of the Ruse organisation, was elected as the national chairperson. Archbishop Mario Rizzi, Bulgaria's first nuncio after 1989, also attended the event.

Due to the inclusion of the word "Catholic" in the name of the organisation, the federation failed to register for a long time, which also delayed its acceptance into the global confederation Caritas Internationalis. Both milestones were achieved in 1995, when the federation joined Caritas Internationalis and Caritas Bulgaria was officially registered in court.

In the spring of 1996, Bulgaria faced an economic crisis and hyperinflation, leading to a humanitarian emergency during the harsh winter of 1996/1997. This crisis marked the first national-level test for the federation, which mobilised over 750 volunteers to distribute aid across the country. In subsequent years, Caritas Bulgaria shifted its focus to specific social groups, including refugees from Kosovo and drug addicts. A mobile office was established to assist the latter in 1999. During the 2005 floods, Caritas provided substantial support to affected communities.

After Bulgaria's accession to the European Union, Caritas organisations abroad, which had been the primary source of funding, began to withdraw. This created financial challenges for the three diocesan organisations, prompting them to seek alternative funding sources.

Caritas Bulgaria observes its holiday on the World Day of the Poor, the Sunday after 13 November. This day is marked by various initiatives aimed at encouraging donations and raising awareness of its mission.

== Structure ==
Caritas Bulgaria is a federation of three independent diocesan Caritas organisations, coordinated and supported by a national office. In 2019, the entire federation implemented its work through a network of 600 people, with most of them being volunteers.

=== Caritas Sofia ===
Caritas Sofia is a charitable organization of the Catholic Apostolic Exarchate in Bulgaria. It was established on 31 August 1993 to carry out charitable works on its behalf. The Young Caritas Sofia branch focuses on the promotion of sustainable lifestyles in Bulgaria through volunteering. According to Vihren Mitev, the projects coordinator of Young Caritas Sofia, young people link Bulgaria to the world through international collaborations and, at the same time, develop volunteering and leadership.

=== Caritas Vitania ===
The charitable Catholic organisation Caritas Vitania was established in 2011 by the Roman Catholic Diocese of Sofia and Plovdiv. It is the successor of the former Caritas Plovdiv, which was established in 1991 and declared bankrupt on January 1, 2009.

=== Caritas Ruse ===
Caritas Ruse was established in 1992 as a charitable organisation of the Catholic Church, active in the territory of the Roman Catholic Diocese of Nicopolis. It provides various social services in support of children with special needs, children from at-risk families, homeless people, and the elderly. Since 2022, aid has also been provided to Ukrainian refugees in dedicated centres in Ruse and Varna.

== Work ==
Caritas focuses its activities on three main areas. The first is social, health, and educational care, providing services to support various social groups, including elderly people with illnesses, children and young people at risk, children and young people with disabilities, individuals struggling with addiction to psychoactive substances, women in disadvantaged situations, and homeless individuals.

The second area is disaster response. In cases of significant natural disasters, Caritas provides assistance to those severely affected, helping them return to a normal way of life. This includes both Bulgarians affected by disasters and refugees and asylum seekers.

The third area is advocacy. Building on its practical experience and its engagement with people in dire need, Caritas undertakes advocacy actions aimed at influencing authorities to address systemic issues and improve conditions for vulnerable groups.

In 2023, Caritas Bulgaria and its member organisations provided aid to among other more than 1,000 people living on the street and around 14,000 Ukrainian refugees. In addition, 618 people in need over the age of 65 and 432 children and youth at risk beneffited from support, as well as hundreds of other persons with various needs.

== Governance ==
The highest governance member of Caritas Bulgaria is the president. Since its inception, the presidents of the organisation were:

- Nadka Girgincheva (1993 – 1997)
- Dr. Hristo Kalamov (1997 – 2002)
- Bishop Petko Christov (2002 – 2020)
- Bishop Rumen Stanev (2020 –)
