= Strahil Kavalenov =

The Most Reverend Strahil Kavalenov
- Bishop of Nicopolis
- Native name: Страхил Веселинов Каваленов
- Church: Roman Catholic Church
- Diocese: Nicopolis
- See: Nicopolis
- Appointed: 20 January 2021
- Term ended: 9 April 2026
- Predecessor: Petko Christov
- Previous post: Apostolic Administrator of Nicopolis (2020-2021)

Orders
- Ordination: 18 April 2009 by Petko Christov
- Consecration: 19 March 2021 by Anselmo Guido Pecorari

Personal details
- Born: Strahil Veselinov Kavalenov; 25 March 1966 (age 60) Razgrad, Montana Province, Bulgaria
- Coat of arms

Strahil Kavalenov (25 March 1966) is a Bulgarian Catholic prelate who served as Bishop of Nicopolis since 2021 until his resignation in 2026.

== Biography ==
Strahil Veselinov Kavalenov was born in the village of Razgrad, Montana District, but grew up in Sofia. He graduated from NGDEK St. Constantine Cyril the Philosopher and history at Sofia University. Kavalenov then taught at various schools in Sofia.

He began his spiritual training at later studied philosophy and Catholic theology at the Theological Faculty of Lugano and after went to the Pontifical Theological Academy in Krakow, Poland. He then studied and graduated from the Pontifical Lateran University in Rome. During his studies in Rome he was an alumnus of the Pontifical Collegium Russicum.

After his return to Bulgaria, on 18 April 2009, Kavalenov was ordained a priest by the Bishop of Nicopolis Petko Christov in Belene in the presence of Msgr. Janusz Bolonek, papal nuncio and Bishop of Sofia and Plovdiv Georgi Yovchev.

He was then appointed parish priest in the parish of the Blessed Virgin Mary of the Rosary in Veliko Tarnovo. Since 1 January 2012 he has also taken care of the parish Blessed Evgeniy Bosilkov in Gabrovo.

From March 2018 to 14 September 2020 Kavalenov was Vicar General of the Diocese of Nikopol. Father Kavalenov speaks four languages - Italian, Polish, French and Russian, and as a graduate of the classical high school he speaks Latin and ancient Greek. He was appointed by the Catholic Episcopal Conference in Bulgaria as a translator of Pope Francis during his Apostolic Pilgrimage to Bulgaria from 5 to 7 May 2019. Father Kavalenov is a participant and main organizer of a number of events in Sofia and Veliko Tarnovo, presenting the personality and pontificate of Pope Francis, the Second Vatican Council, the encyclicals Laudato si' (Praise be to You) and Pacem in terris (Peace on Earth).

Since June 2020, Father Kavalenov has been Chairman of the Management Board of Caritas Ruse. After the death of Bishop Petko Hristov on 14 September 2020, he was appointed Apostolic Administrator of the Diocese of Nicopolis a day after, on 15 September. On 5 October 2020 he was awarded the Cross of Merit "Mary Melitensi" which is handed to the clergy of the Sovereign Military Hospitaller Order of Saint John of Jerusalem, Rhodes and Malta.

On 20 January 2021 Father Kavalenov was appointed by Pope Francis as Bishop of the Diocese of Nicopolis. On 19 March 2021, in the Cathedral of St. Paul of the Cross in Rousse, he was consecrated Bishop of Nicopolis by Archbishop Anselmo Guido Pecorari, together with Bishop Georgi Yovchev and Bishop Christo Proykov.

He resigned as bishop of Nicopolis because of health reasons on 9 April 2026.

== Awards ==
- "Badge of Honor" of the Institute for the Study of Societies and Knowledge at the Bulgarian Academy of Sciences, in 2019.
- The Great Cross "Pro piis meritis Melitensi" ("Merito Melitensi") of the Order of Malta.

== Bibliography ==
- Kercheva K., Kavalenov S., European Dynasties, Agato Publishing House, Veliko Tarnovo, 2001.
- Kavalenov S., The Parishes of Veliko Tarnovo and Gabrovo, Zaedno newspaper, issue 86, 2012.
- Dzhurova A., Kavalenov S., “The Christian Roots of Europe. The Papacy and the Bulgarians (IX - XXI century)" - catalog of the exhibition, "Ars Millennium MMM", Sofia, 2019 (ISBN 978-954-2950-34-9).
