= Samuel Dzhundrin =

Samuel Dzhundrin AA
- Bishop of Nicopoli
- Native name: Самуил Джундрин
- Church: Catholic Church
- Diocese: Diocese of Nicopolis
- In office: 14 December 1978 – 28 June 1994
- Predecessor: Vasco Séirécov
- Successor: Petko Christov

Orders
- Ordination: 4 June 1944
- Consecration: 27 May 1979 by Pope John Paul II

Personal details
- Born: 26 April 1920 General Nikolaevo Village, Plovdiv Province, Kingdom of Bulgaria
- Died: 19 March 1998 (aged 77) Plovdiv, Plovdiv Province, Bulgaria

Samuel Dzhundrin, AA (26 April 1920 – 19 March 1998) was a Bulgarian Roman Catholic prelate who served as Bishop of Nicopolis from 1978 to 1994. He was a member of the Assumptionists.

== Early life ==
Dzhundrin was born in what is now the town of Rakovski. After the fourth section, he was sent to study in the Yambol seminary, from 1931 to 1934. After finishing school, he joined the Plovdiv Seminary. In 1939, he went to France and spent a year completing his novitiate under the Augustino-Assumptionist Fathers in the city of Nozeroy. From 1940 to 1944 he studied philosophy and theology. For health reasons, he moved to and continued his education in Lyon, where he received his priestly ordination on 4 June 1944.

== Career ==
In 1947 he returned to Bulgaria to teach in St. Augustine college in Plovdiv. The government liquidated the college in 1948, causing him to move to Northern Bulgaria with Father Chonkov Assen. Bishop Eugene Bossilkov appointed him parish priest of the villages Bardarski Geran and Bregare.

Father Assen was put on trial in 1952 and was sentenced to 12 years in prison. Father Dzhundrin returned to Plovdiv with him. Assen served his sentence in camps at Belene and Stara Zagora, and left in 1961. In Plovdiv, Samuel found that there was no spiritual work available. Thanks to a former acquaintance, he was accommodated in the village of Kaloyanovo as assistant parish priest. There, on 14 December 1978, he received the papal appointment to Bishop of Diocese of Nikopol. He was ordained on 27 May 1979 in St. Peter's Basilica by Pope John Paul II, with Cardinals Duraysami Lourdusami Simon and Eduardo Martinez Somaly. For 15 years he managed the diocese, until he retired in 1994 due to health issues. He lived for a year with his fellow-Augustino Assumptionist Fathers, then returned to the Diocese of Nikopol, and finally again to Plovdiv. He died suddenly on 19 March 1998.
