= Anatoli Kirilov =

Bulgarian footballer and manager

Personal information
- Place of birth: Bulgaria
- Date of death: 21 May 2009 (aged 42)
- Place of death: Tatari, Bulgaria

Senior career*
Years	Team	Apps	(Gls)
- Spartak Pleven

Managerial career
- 2009: Spartak Varna
- * Club domestic league appearances and goals

Anatoli Kirilov (Bulgarian: Анатоли Кирилов) (died 21 May 2009) was a Bulgarian professional football player and manager. Kirilov, who was manager of Spartak Varna at the time, died on 21 May 2009 in a car accident, at the age of 42.
