= Belene Island =

Bulgarian island in the Danube river

Coordinates: 43.67°N 25.19°E

Map of Belene Island

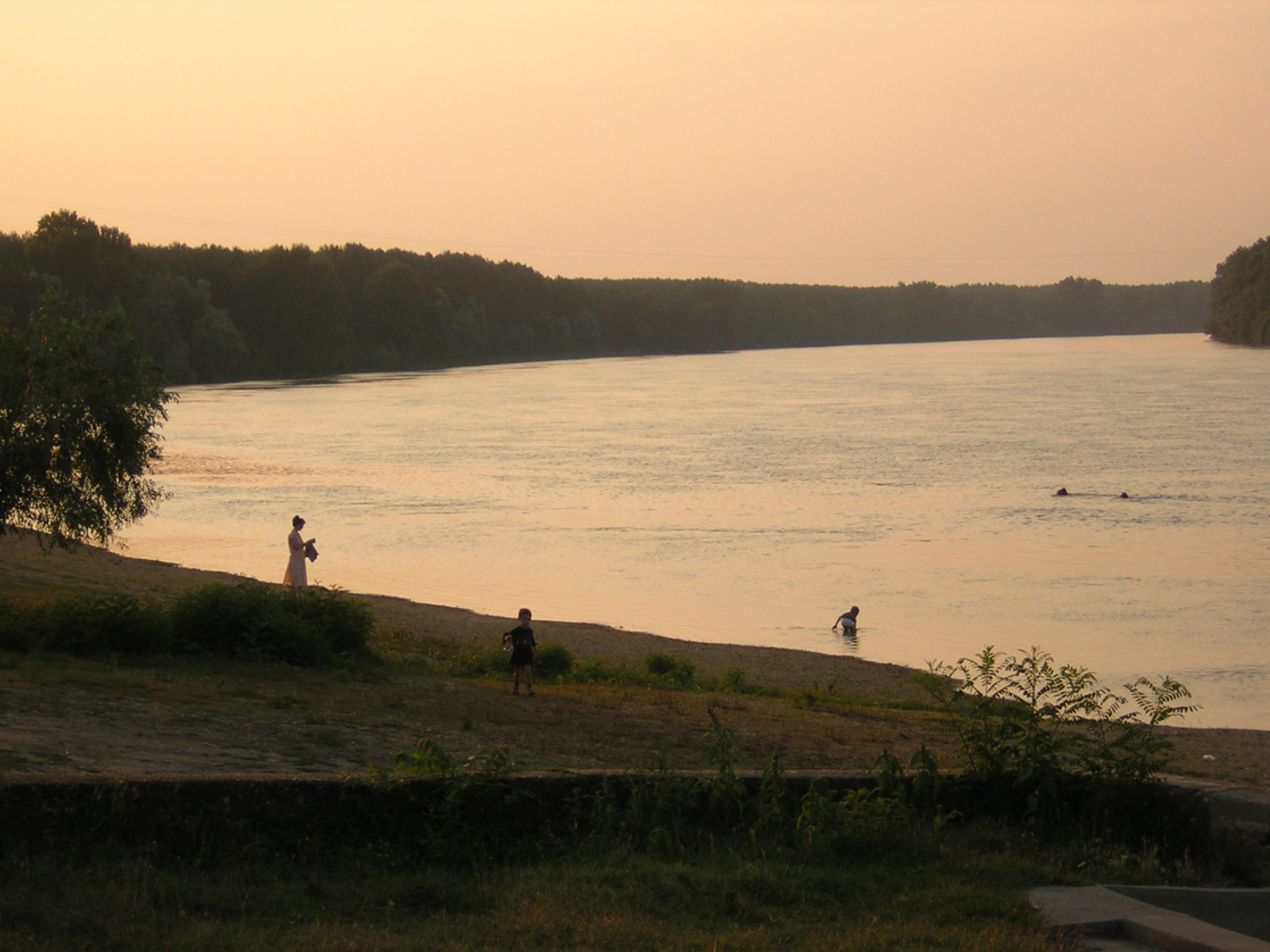
The Danube between Belene and Belene Island

Belene Island (Bulgarian: остров Белене, romanized: ostrov Belene) or Persin Island (Bulgarian: остров Персин, romanized: ostrov Persin) is the biggest island in Bulgarian waters. The island is formed by the Danube River splitting into two branches passing north and south of it. The international frontier between Bulgaria and Romania follows the north branch of the river and therefore Belene Island is part of the Bulgarian territory. The island is 14.5 kilometres (9.0 mi) long and reaching 6 km (3.7 mi) in width; it is located in the Danube, north of the town of Belene. Belene Island is the fourth biggest Danube island: during an average tide it is 41.078 square kilometres (15.860 sq mi) in area. During a high tide, parts of the island are submerged. The island is connected to the town of Belene with a pontoon bridge.

Belene Island is a part of the Belene Islands Complex and of the Persina Natural Park, a home to over 170 species of rare water birds, such as the glossy ibis, pygmy cormorant, lesser grey shrike, red-breasted goose and others. The flora of Belene Island is represented by willows, poplars and aspens; there is some arable land. The island was formed of alluvial sediments.

The island is infamous for the Belene concentration camp, which held political prisoners between 1949–1953 and 1956–1959. The Belene Prison is still operating as a penitentiary in the western part of the island, while the eastern part is a managed natural reserve.

A battle took place on neighboring Cinghinarele Island in early October 1916, during World War I.

== See also ==
- List of islands of Bulgaria
