= Nikopol, Bulgaria =

Town in northern Bulgaria

Nikopol Никопол
- City
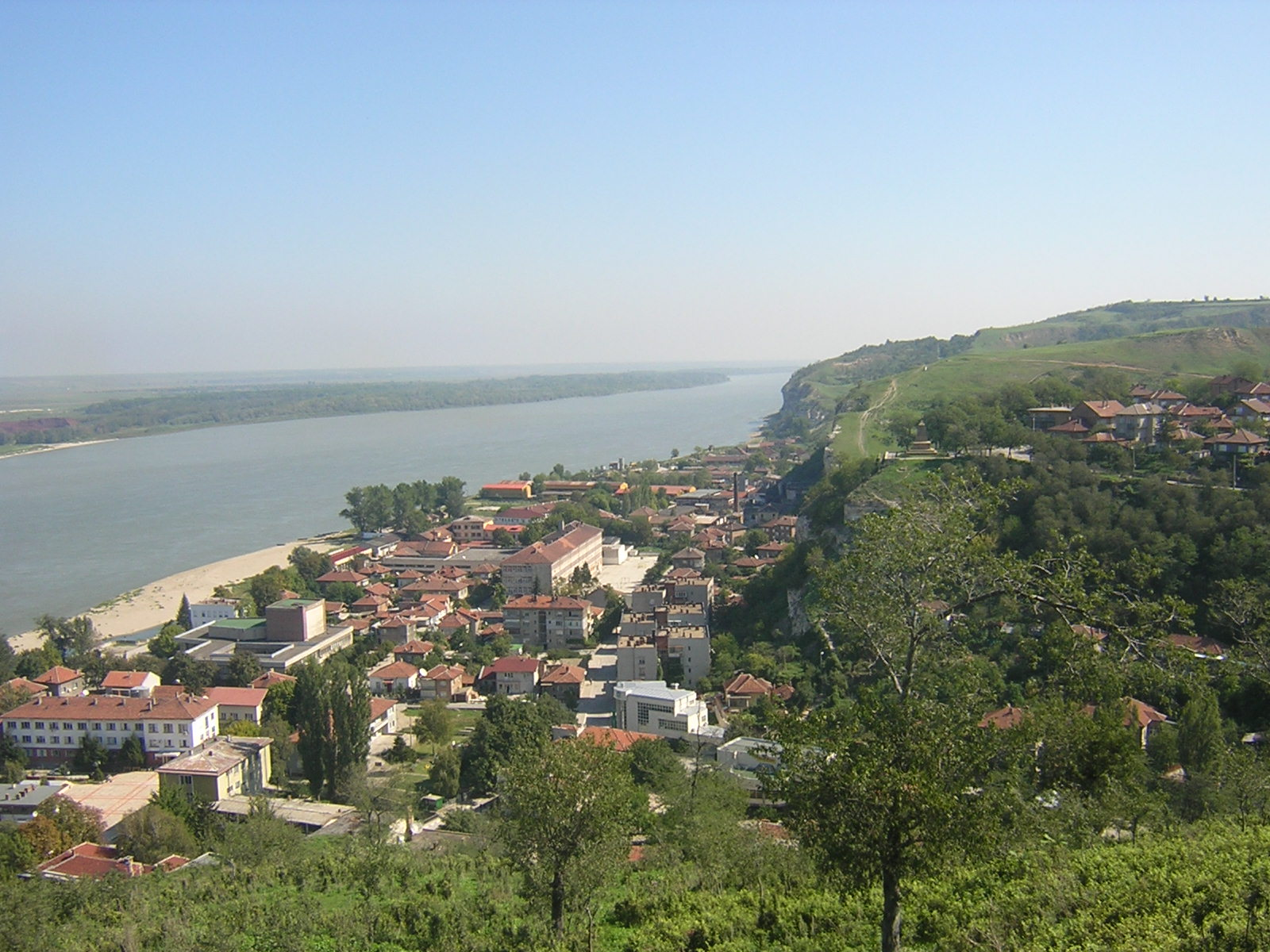
- View of Nikopol from the fortress

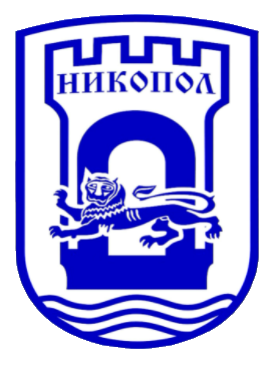
- Coat of arms

- Location of Nikopol within Bulgaria
- Coordinates: 43°42′N 24°54′E
- Country: Bulgaria
- Province: Pleven
- Municipality: Nikopol

Government
  - Mayor: Ivelin Savov (BSP)

Area
  - Total: 35.185 km^{2} (13.585 sq mi)
- Elevation: 179 m (587 ft)

Population (2020)
  - Total: 3,629
  - Density: 103.1/km^{2} (267.1/sq mi)
- Postal code: 5940

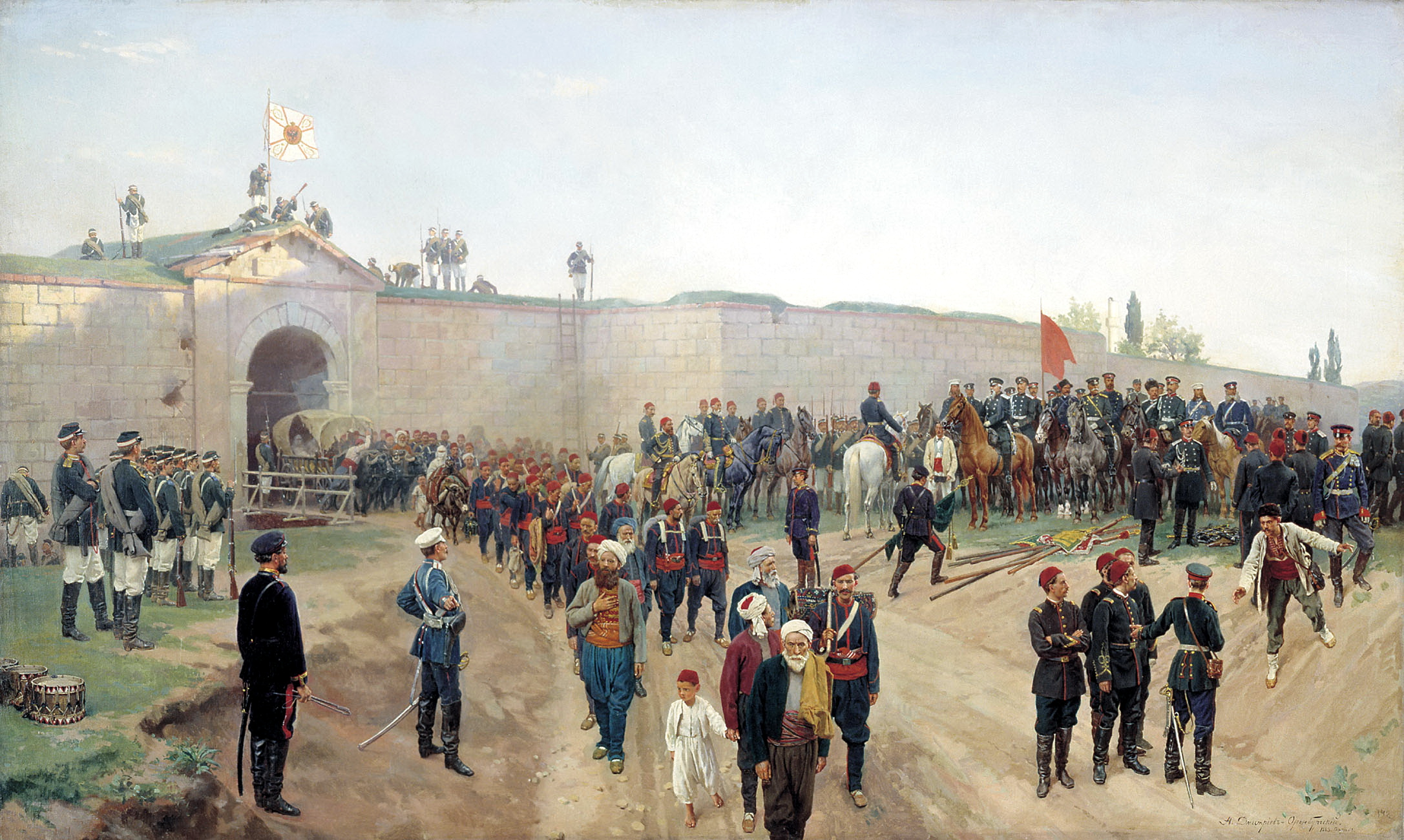
Capitulation of Nikopol fortress, July 4, 1877

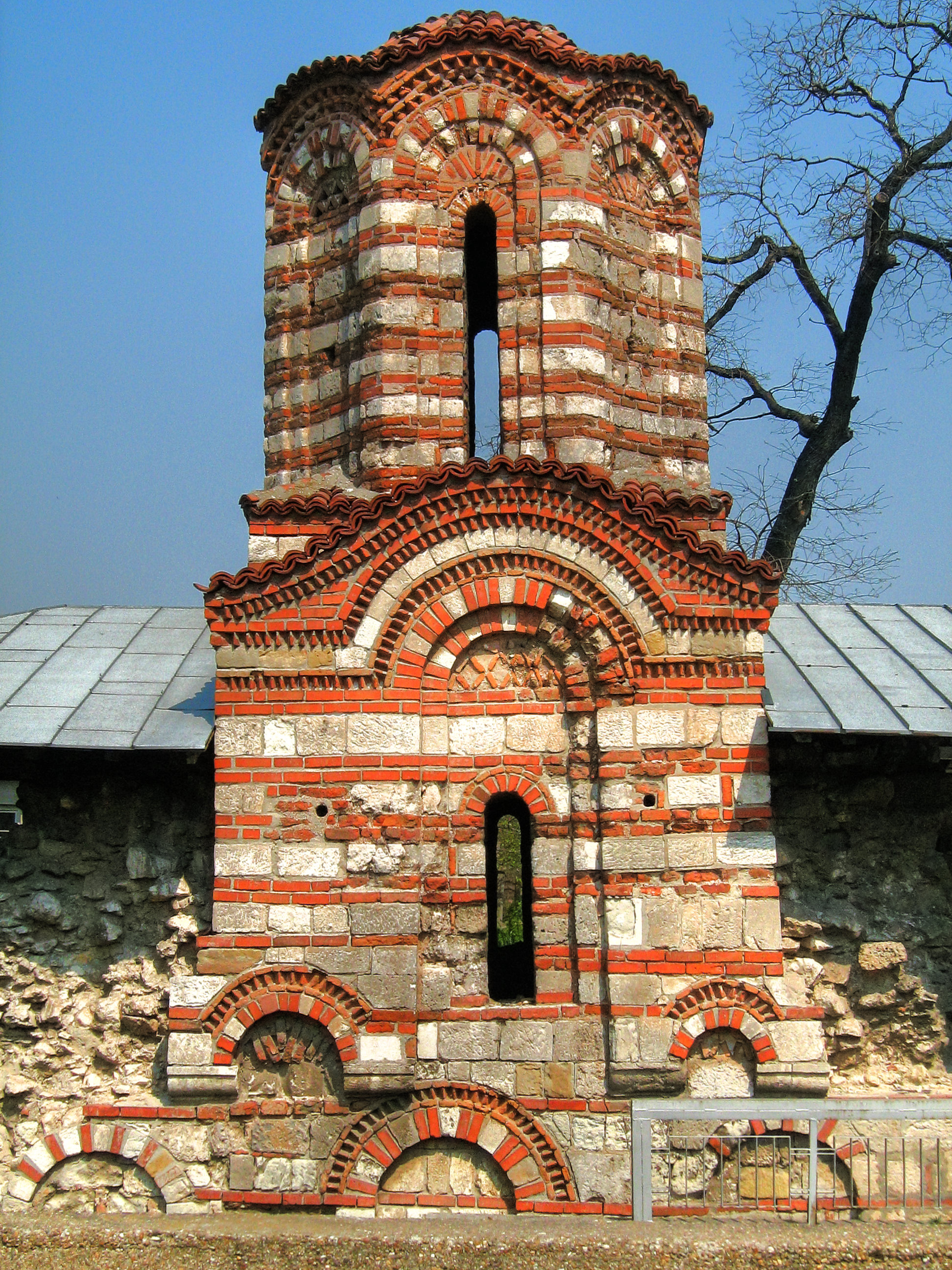
The medieval Church of Saints Peter and Paul in Nikopol

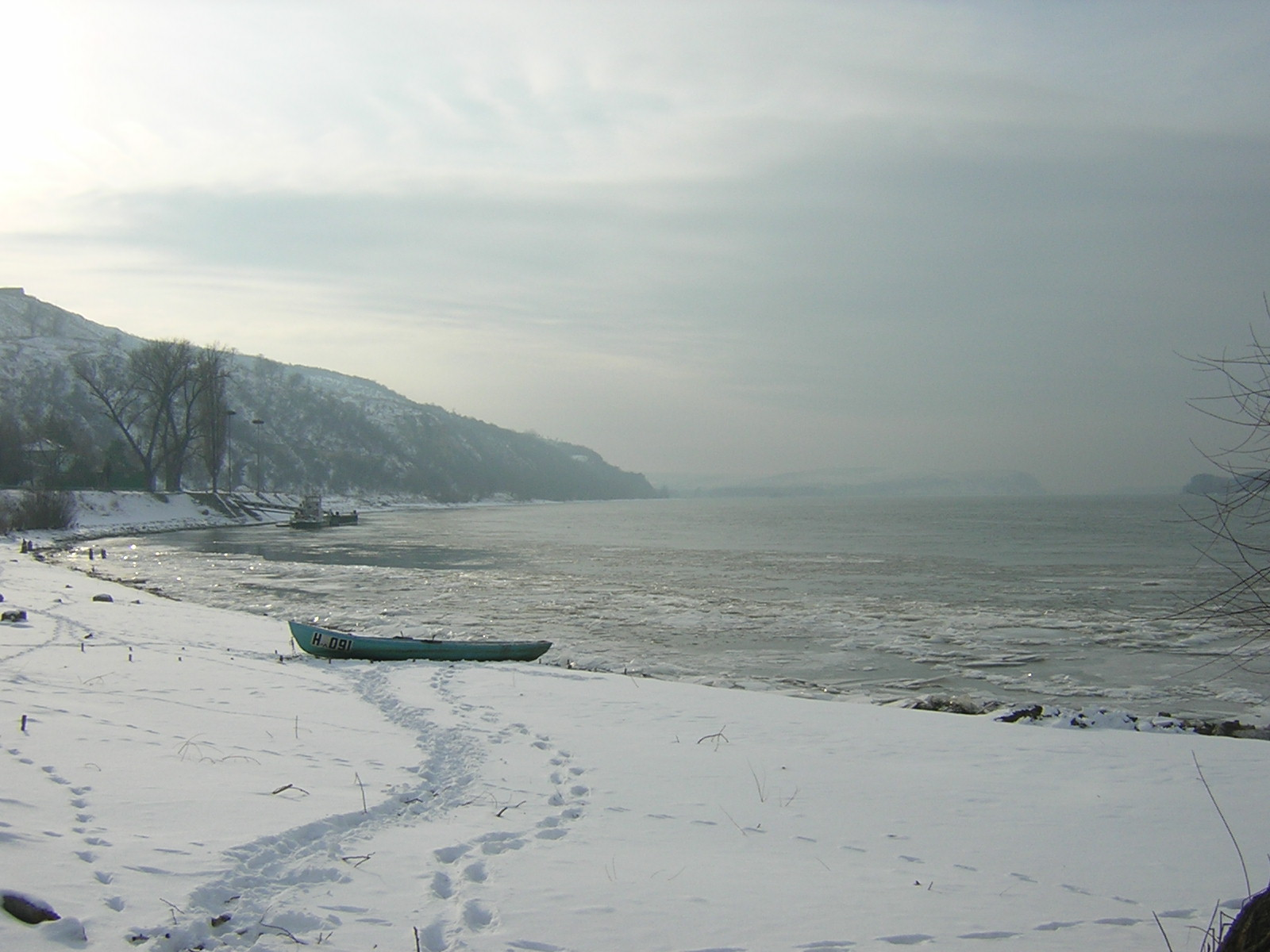
View of the Danube at Nikopol in winter

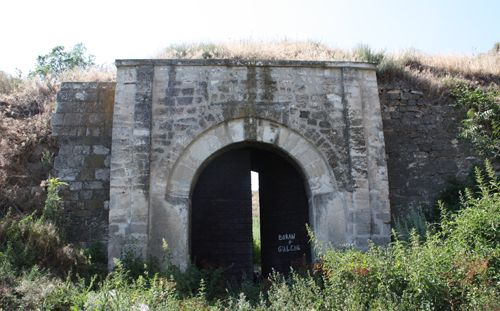
Entrance gate to the Nikopol Fortress

Nikopol (Bulgarian: Никопол [niˈkɔpoɫ]; historically Greek: Νικόπολις, Nikópolis, Latin: Nicopolis, Turkish: Niğbolu) is a town in northern Bulgaria, the administrative center of Nikopol Municipality, part of Pleven Province, on the right bank of the Danube river, 4 kilometres (2 miles) downstream from the Danube’s confluence with the Osam river. It spreads at the foot of steep chalk cliffs along the Danube and up a narrow valley.

== History ==
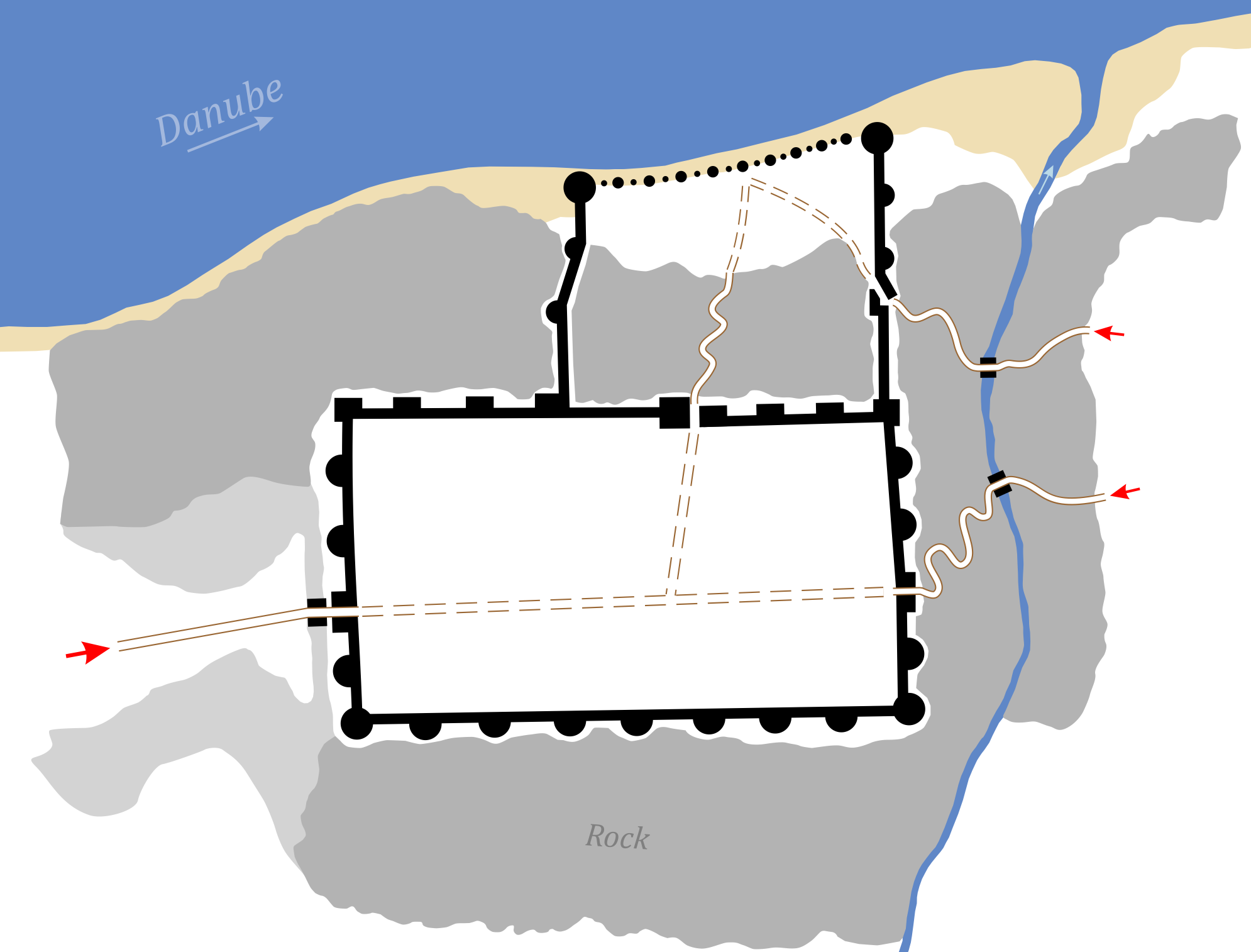
Plan of fort

The Roman fort ("Kaleto Fortress") is located on the western hill of Nikopol overlooking the town. It was initially built probably in the 1st c. AD as part of the Limes Moesiae frontier defense system along the Danube, part of the Danubian limes. The garrison before 49 AD was Ala I Scubulorum, a cavalry regiment. The Roman town grew up outside the fort.

Two other Roman forts on the Danube were nearby to the west: Ansamus (3 km) and Securisca (5 km). A garrison of one of these was ala Bosporanorum milliaria, a nominally 1000-strong cavalry regiment stationed there before the time of Claudius (r. 41 to 54). Anasamus is included in the Notitia Dignitatum with the garrison of the military unit milites praeventores dating to 378 AD, and where there was also a mansio included on the Tabula Peutingeriana dating from the 3rd c. AD. These milites praeventores are the only unit of this type recorded in the Notitia Dignitatum, and was a special regiment for active defense, including surprise actions, of the border sector.

When the border and the Roman Empire in the Lower Danubian lands were strongly threatened by unceasing Hunnic raids in 447, the inhabitants of Ansamus showed unexpected high spirit and enviable military skills, by which they not only repelled an enemy siege, but demanded conditions from Attila himself, according to Priscus. "They did not defend themselves from their walls, but fought battles outside the walls against countless troops and famous Scythian generals. Because of this, the Huns despaired and retreated from the town. The inhabitants of the town made raids far from their fortifications when their scouts informed them that enemies were passing, laden with Roman booty. They attacked them unexpectedly and took their booty. Although they were far fewer than the enemy, they exceeded them in courage and strength."

After the decline of the Roman Empire, the town turned out to be located at the northern border of the Byzantine Empire. In 1059, it was named Nicopolis, Greek for "City of Victory". During most of the Middle Ages, it was part of the Bulgarian Empire from its foundation in 681. After the fall of Tarnovo in 1393, the last Bulgarian Tsar Ivan Shishman defended what remained of the Empire from the fortress of Nikopol, where he was captured after the town was conquered by the Ottomans in 1395. Nikopol is therefore sometimes considered the capital of Bulgaria during these two years. It was the site of the Battle of Nicopolis, the last large-scale crusade of the Middle Ages, in 1396. At the fortress of Nicopolis, the united armies of Christian Europe headed by Hungarian king Sigismund and various French knights were defeated by the Ottomans under Bayezid I and his Serbian vassal Stefan Lazarević.

Under Ottoman rule, Nikopol developed into an important military and administrative centre as a sanjak, with a strong fortress and a flourishing economic, spiritual and political life, until it went into decline during the 17th and 18th centuries. It was the centre of a district (kaza), but it was overtaken by Pleven as the regional centre of that part of the Bulgarian lands. Nikopol was captured by the Russians in the Battle of Nikopol in 1877.

== Modern times ==
It is the seat of Nikopol municipality and provides services to the local villages. Nikopol was partially flooded by the Danube during the 2006 European floods, and is currently working on new town infrastructure to manage fluctuations in the Danube River.

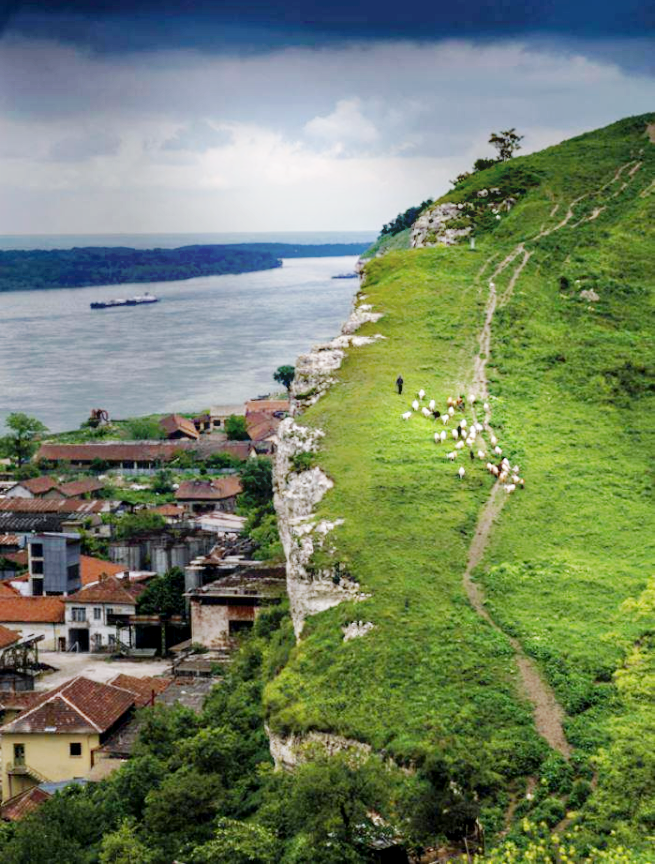
Overhead view of Nikopol, northern Bulgaria. - Панорамен изглед от Нико̀пол.

The completion of a car ferry in 2010 has linked the town to Turnu Măgurele across the Danube in Romania, spurring local development, including the opening of new restaurants and the town's first hotel. Nikopol also serves as a port for tourist boats where visitors stop and have the opportunity to take a bus into the nearby city of Pleven, or spend the afternoon in Nikopol.

The fifth-largest nature park in Bulgaria, Persina Natural Park, lies partially in Nikopol. Persina Natural Park is the only Bulgarian natural park on the Danube River, and contains marshlands, over 200 species of birds, 475 species of plants, and 1,100 species of animals. Based on the importance and uniqueness, Persina Natural Park has been declared a Ramsar site.

Tourist attractions in Nikopol include the ruins of the medieval fortress, the richly decorated 13th- or 14th-century Church of Saints Peter and Paul, the rock-hewn Church of Saint Stephen, the Bulgarian National Revival Church of the Dormition of the Mother of God from 1840, the Elia water fountain with an immured Ancient Roman gravestone featuring an epitaph, and the Vasil Levski museum house.

== Twin towns – sister cities ==
Nikopol is twinned with:

- Halásztelek, Hungary
- Shakhty, Russia
- Turnu Magurele, Romania

== Notable people ==
- Ivan Shishman of Bulgaria, the last emperor of the Second Bulgarian Empire, beheaded at Nikopol in 1395
- Jean de Vienne, French general and knight (1341 – 1396), died at Nikopol
- Jean de Carrouges, French knight (1330s – 1396), died at Nikopol
- Skanderbeg in 1430 had a fiefdom at Nikopol
- Eve Frank, born at Nikopol (1754–1816), successor of her father, the Jewish Messiah claimant Jacob Frank, founder of Frankism.
- Joseph Karo, renowned Jewish scholar and rabbi, who lived in Nikopol from 1523 to 1536

== Honour ==
Nikopol Point on Livingston Island in the South Shetland Islands, Antarctica, is named after Nikopol.
