= Petko Christov =

Roman Catholic bishop (1950–2020)

The Most Reverend Petko Christov OFM. Conv.
- Bishop of Nicopolis
- Church: Roman Catholic Church
- Diocese: Nicopolis
- See: Nicopolis
- Appointed: 18 October 1994

Orders
- Ordination: 15 December 1985 by Samuel Dzhundrin
- Consecration: 6 January 1995 by Pope John Paul II

Personal details
- Born: Petko Jordanov Christov; October 9, 1950 Velchevo (village), Veliko Tarnovo, Bulgaria
- Died: September 14, 2020 (aged 69) Ruse, Bulgaria

Coat of arms of Petko Jordanov Christov

Petko Jordanov Christov, OFM Conv. (Bulgarian: Петко Йорданов Христов; 9 October 1950 – 14 September 2020) was a Bulgarian Catholic prelate who served as Bishop of Nicopolis from 1994 until his death in 2020. He was a member of the Order of Friars Minor Conventual.

== Biography ==
Petko Jordanov Christov was born in Velcevo, Veliko Tarnovo. He studied at the Professional School of Engineering, Architecture and Geodesy ("Angel Popov") in Veliko Tarnovo, in the fields of civil engineering and architecture.

From 1977 to 1985 in Bulgaria he studied to become a priest and was ordained on 15 December 1985 by Bishop Samuel Dzhundrin. In 1990 Christov gave his first vows in the order of Franciscans on 15 December 1993. He served in parishes in Belene and Tranchovitsa. On 18 October 1994 he was consecrated by Pope John Paul II as Bishop of Nicopolis. On 6 January 1995 he was ordained at St. Peter's Basilica in the Vatican by John Paul II, with cardinals Giovanni Battista Re and Jorge María Mejía being his co-consecrators.

From 1992 to 1993 he was one of the founders of Caritas in Belem. Christov was president of the Catholic charity Caritas in Bulgaria since 1997 and a member of the Episcopal Conference of Bulgaria. On December 1, 2001 in Sofia at the XVIII National Conference of Caritas Bulgaria he was elected its president.

In the Episcopal Conference of Bulgaria he was the chairman of the following committees:

- Congregation for Institutes of Consecrated Life and Societies of Apostolic Life
- Pontifical Council for Promoting Christian Unity
- Pontifical Council Cor Unum

After illness, Bishop Christov died on September 14, 2020 in the hospital in the city of Ruse at the age of 69. He was buried in a special chapel in the cathedral in Ruse on September 19, 2020.

== Distinctions ==
- Order pro merito Melitensi, bestowed by the ambassador of the Sovereign Military Order of Malta, His Excellency Count Camillo Dzukoli in a ceremony in St Paul of the Cross Cathedral in Rousse, 30 November 2011, for his active work and cooperation related to charitable activities of the Catholic Church in Bulgaria
