= Manush Romanov =

Bulgarian politician and Romani rights activist (1928–2004)

- Мануш Романов

Member of the National Assembly
- In office 10 June 1990 – 13 October 1991

Personal details
- Born: Mustafa Aliyev; 1928 Sofia, Bulgaria
- Died: 10 December 2004 (aged 75–76) Istanbul, Turkey
- Party: Democratic Union Roma
- Other political affiliations: Union of Democratic Forces (1990–1991)

Manush Romanov (Bulgarian: Мануш Романов, Turkish: Manuş Romanov; 1928 – 10 December 2004), born Mustafa Aliyev (Bulgarian: Мустафа Алиев), was a Bulgarian politician and Romani rights activist. He was a member of the National Assembly from 1990 to 1991, representing the Union of Democratic Forces.

== Biography ==
Manush Romanov was born Mustafa Aliyev in 1928, to a Turkish Roma family in Sofia. Prior to his political career, he worked as a theatre director at the Roma Central Gypsy Theatre. Aliyev was also a playwright and collected folklore. Aliyev adopted the name "Manush Romanov" as part of the Revival Process.

Following the death of Roma Bulgarian Communist Party politician Shakir Pashov, Romanov spoke at his funeral, pledging to continue his work. At this time, he came under surveillance by the Committee for State Security. On 17 March 1990, the Democratic Union Roma was founded, with Romanov as its leader. The organisation was established by the Bulgarian Socialist Party with the intention of representing the Roma at the Bulgarian Round Table Talks. During the talks, the Democratic Union Roma abandoned the BSP for the Union of Democratic Forces. Romanov was one of three Romani members of the National Assembly elected during the 1990 Bulgarian Constitutional Assembly election, alongside Sabi Golemanov and Petar Aleksandrov of the BSP. After being excluded from a role in steering the policy of the Union of Democratic Forces ahead 1991 Bulgarian parliamentary election, Romanov left the party in autumn 1991 and unsuccessfully attempted to ensure the Democratic Union Roma's continued political relevance.

Romanov died on 10 December 2004, in Istanbul.
