= Church of Saints Peter and Paul, Nikopol =

Church in Nikopol, Bulgaria

Coordinates: 43°42′9″N 24°53′58.3″E

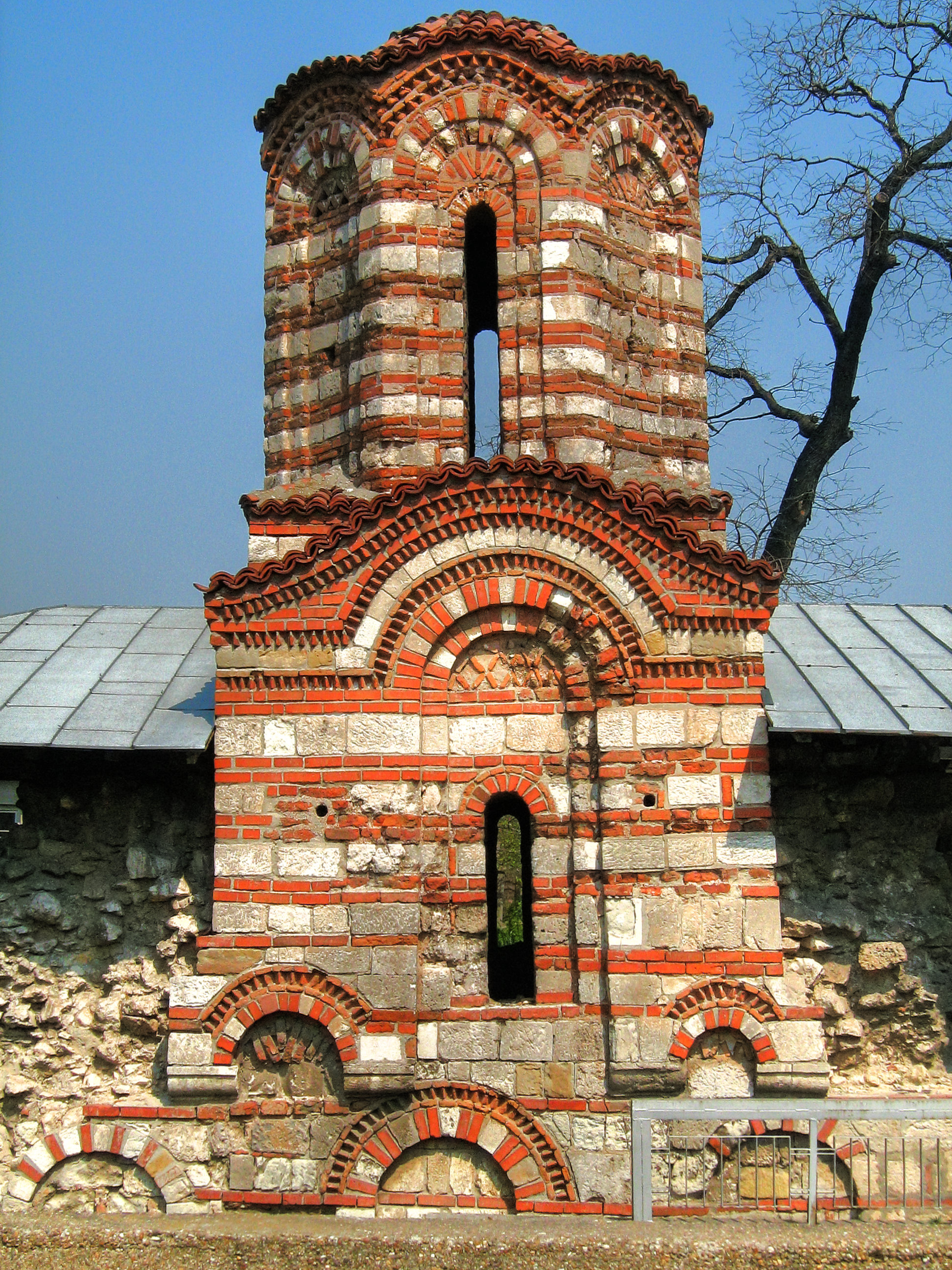
The Church of Saints Peter and Paul in Nikopol

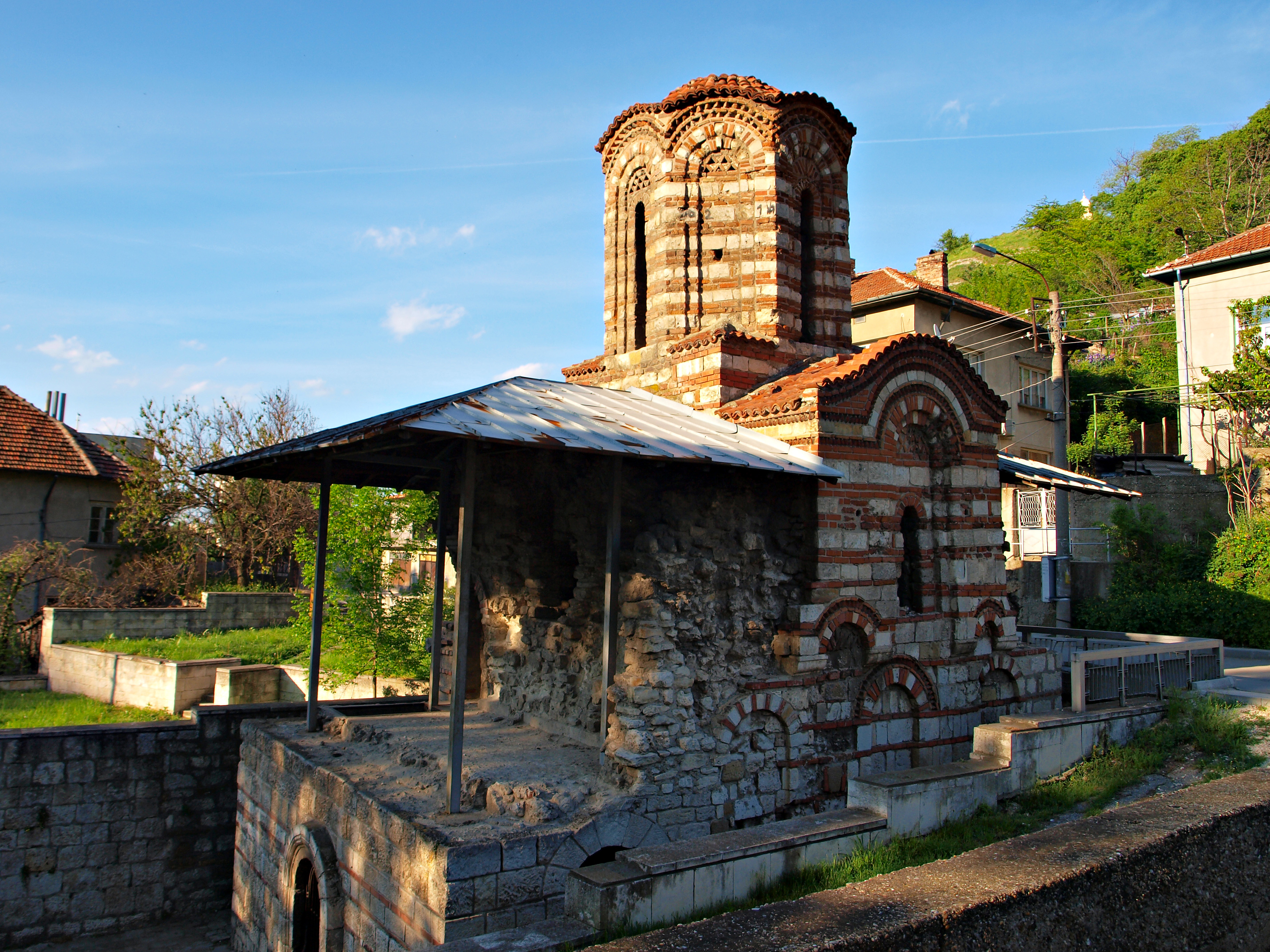
Side view

The Church of Saints Peter and Paul (Bulgarian: църква „Свети свети Петър и Павел“, tsarkva „Sveti sveti Petar i Pavel“) is a partially preserved medieval Eastern Orthodox church in the town of Nikopol, which lies in north central Bulgaria on the south bank of the Danube and is administratively part of Pleven Province. The church was built in the 13th or 14th century and was decorated with brick and marble patterns. The west part of the church (the narthex) is entirely in ruins.

== History and architecture ==
The Church of Saints Peter and Paul is known to the locals as "The Little Monastery" (Манастирчето, Manastircheto), possibly because it once belonged to a now-ruined medieval monastery. Located beneath the northeastern part of Nikopol's medieval fortress, the church has been conclusively dated to the 13th–14th century, that is, the time of the Second Bulgarian Empire (1185–1396/1422). During this period, Nikopol evolved into a major Bulgarian fortress on the Danube and a cultural centre of its region.

The church is of the crossed-dome style and its cella is almost square, as it measures 10 by 7 metres (33 ft × 23 ft). The church has a single apse and a single nave, and it used to have three domes. The elongated main octagonal dome has been preserved, though the two other domes, which were positioned over the narthex, have not, as the entire narthex has been destroyed. The walls of the church were constructed out of rectangular stone blocks interchanged with two rows of red brickwork. More elaborate stone and brick patterns decorate the facade and the main dome. Each of the dome's eight sides features arches, with either a narrow window or a blind arch nested in. Marble was employed in the facade's decoration. The overall architectural style has been likened to that of Veliko Tarnovo and Nesebar's medieval churches.

The Church of Saints Peter and Paul could possibly be the one referenced in 15th-century writer Vladislav the Grammarian's account of the transportation of Saint John of Rila's relics from Tarnovo back to the Rila Monastery in 1469. However, scholar Bistra Nikolova believes that the connection is far from certain, as the church from Vladislav's writings is only known as "the church of zhupan Bogdan" and was located within the Nikopol Fortress.

The church is included among Bulgaria's monuments of culture of national importance. It was added to the list in 1927, with a publication in that year's State Gazette issue 69.
