= Shakir Pashov =

Bulgarian Romani revolutionary and politician (1898–1981)

- Шакир Пашов
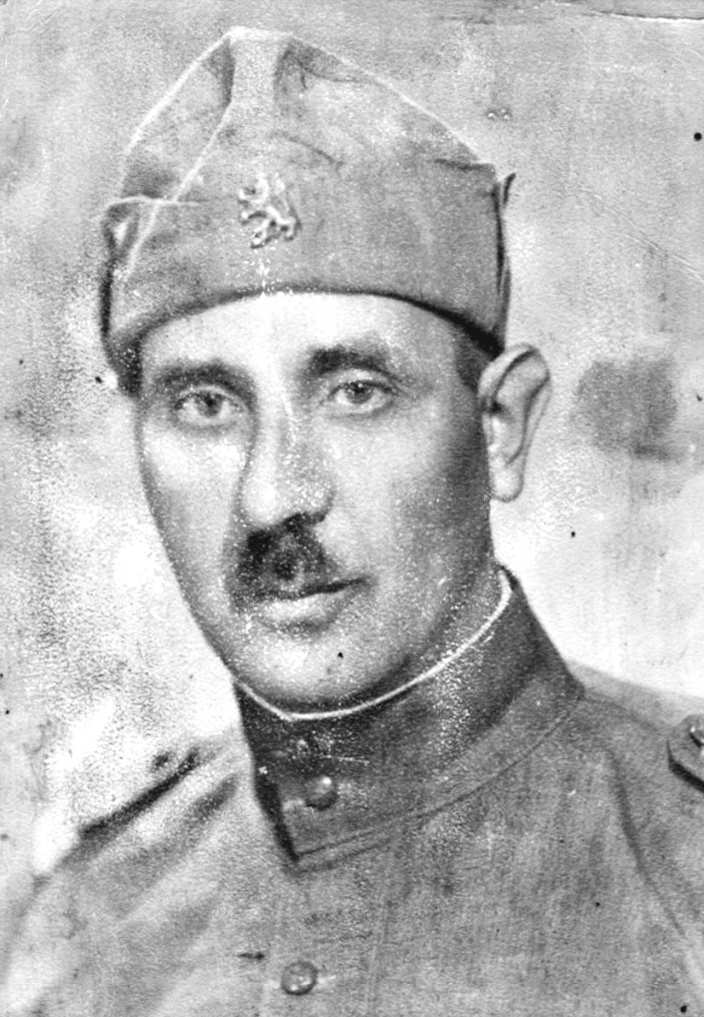
- Pashov as a Bulgarian Army soldier, c. 1915–1918

Member of the Grand National Assembly
- In office c. 1946–1947 – 18 December 1949

Personal details
- Born: 20 October 1898 Gorna Banya, Bulgaria (now Sofia, Bulgaria)
- Died: 5 October 1981 (aged 82) Sofia, Bulgaria
- Party: Bulgarian Social Democratic Workers' Party (Narrow Socialists) (1918–1919); Bulgarian Communist Party (1919–1950, 1967–1981)

Military service
- Allegiance: Bulgaria
- Branch/service: Bulgarian Army
- Battles/wars: World War I; Macedonian front

Shakir Mahmudov Pashov (Bulgarian: Шакир Махмудов Пашов, Turkish: Şakir Paşa; 20 October 1898 – 5 October 1981) was a Bulgarian Romani revolutionary and politician who was a member of the National Assembly from 1947 to 1949. The first Romani member of the National Assembly, he was an advocate for protecting Romani culture and the Romani language, and guided the policy of the People's Republic of Bulgaria towards the Roma under the leadership of Georgi Dimitrov. Following Dimitrov's death, Pashov was expelled from the party and sent to Belene labour camp in 1950. Released in 1956, he was again interned in the village of Rogozina from 1959 to 1962.

== Early life and military career ==
Shakir Mahmudov Pashov was born 20 October 1898 in the village of Gorna Banya, today part of Sofia, to a family of blacksmiths and ironworkers from the Arlije subgroup of Roma. Unusually for Roma at the time, who were largely illiterate, Pashov was educated at a Turkish-medium madrasa before going to a vocational school, where he trained as a railway worker.

He enlisted or was conscripted in the Bulgarian Army in 1915, after Bulgaria joined World War I on the side of the Central Powers, and fought on the Macedonian front alongside other Roma. Pashov developed an increased political consciousness as a result of the war, discussing emancipation of the Roma alongside other soldiers. He was wounded several times during the war. Pashov joined the Bulgarian Social Democratic Workers' Party (Narrow Socialists) in 1918.

== Revolutionary activity (1919–1944) ==
Following the war's end, the movement for equality between Romani people and non-Roma began gaining steam. Between 1919 and 1921, the Egypt organisation was established with the intention of organising the Roma population. Egypt published a newspaper known as Istikbal, which Pashov was the editor of. In 1919, Pashov also joined the Bulgarian Communist Party, establishing a Roma section. That year, he was fired from his job at Bulgarian State Railways for organising the 1919–1920 Bulgarian transport strike. In the early 1920s Pashov was active as a member of the BCP, being elected as a delegate to the party congress in 1922 and as a municipal councillor from the United Front, a coalition between the BCP and the left wing of the Bulgarian Agrarian National Union, in 1924.

After Egypt was banned in 1925, Pashov founded the Istikbal organisation in 1929. The group later adopted the name of the National Muhammadan Organisation for Education, and published the newspaper Terbie from 1931. Pashov also advocated for a Romani school in the village of Tatarli (now the Koniovitsa district of Sofia), attempting to do so through establishing an Islamic religious community, which provided for increased access to loans under Bulgarian law. These efforts were resisted by the non-Romani chief muftiate in Sofia, leading to a protracted dispute that eventually resulted in the Supreme Administrative Court ruling in the muftiate's favour against the existence of a separate Islamic community in Tatarli.

Pashov's political breakthrough as a Romani activist came in 1923, when he met with prime minister Aleksandar Stamboliyski and advocated for the re-enfranchisement of Muslim Romani people after they had been stripped of voting rights in 1901. The National Assembly, dominated by Stamboliyski's Bulgarian Agrarian National Union, voted to return voting rights to Muslim Roma in 1923, but soon after was deposed by a coup d'état. Pashov was subsequently detained for his membership in the Communist Party, and he was again arrested for three months in 1925, after the St. Nedelya Church bombing. After his release, Pashov fled to Turkey.

Upon his return to Bulgaria in 1929, Pashov joined the Bulgarian Workers' Party, a party aligned with the BCP. The National Muhammadan Organisation for Education absorbed several Roma groups encompassing a variety of fields, including education, sports and culture. Following the 1934 Bulgarian coup d'état, all political parties and minority organisations were banned and a campaign of Bulgarisation began. In spite of the Bulgarisation policies of the post-coup government, Pashov continued to be active in Roma civic affairs, organising a campaign against bride prices, leading a delegation of Roma to the birth of crown prince Simeon and soliciting funding from Tsar Boris III in support of the Roma. Pashov later claimed to have been a candidate on the BCP's party list for the National Assembly in the 1920s, a leading member of the Workers' Party in Sofia during the 1930s and a member of the Bulgarian resistance movement during World War II. Researchers Elena Marushiakova and Vesselin Popov have disputed this, noting the lack of documents to prove his claims and evidence from BCP archives suggesting a more limited role.

== Political career, 1944–1950 ==
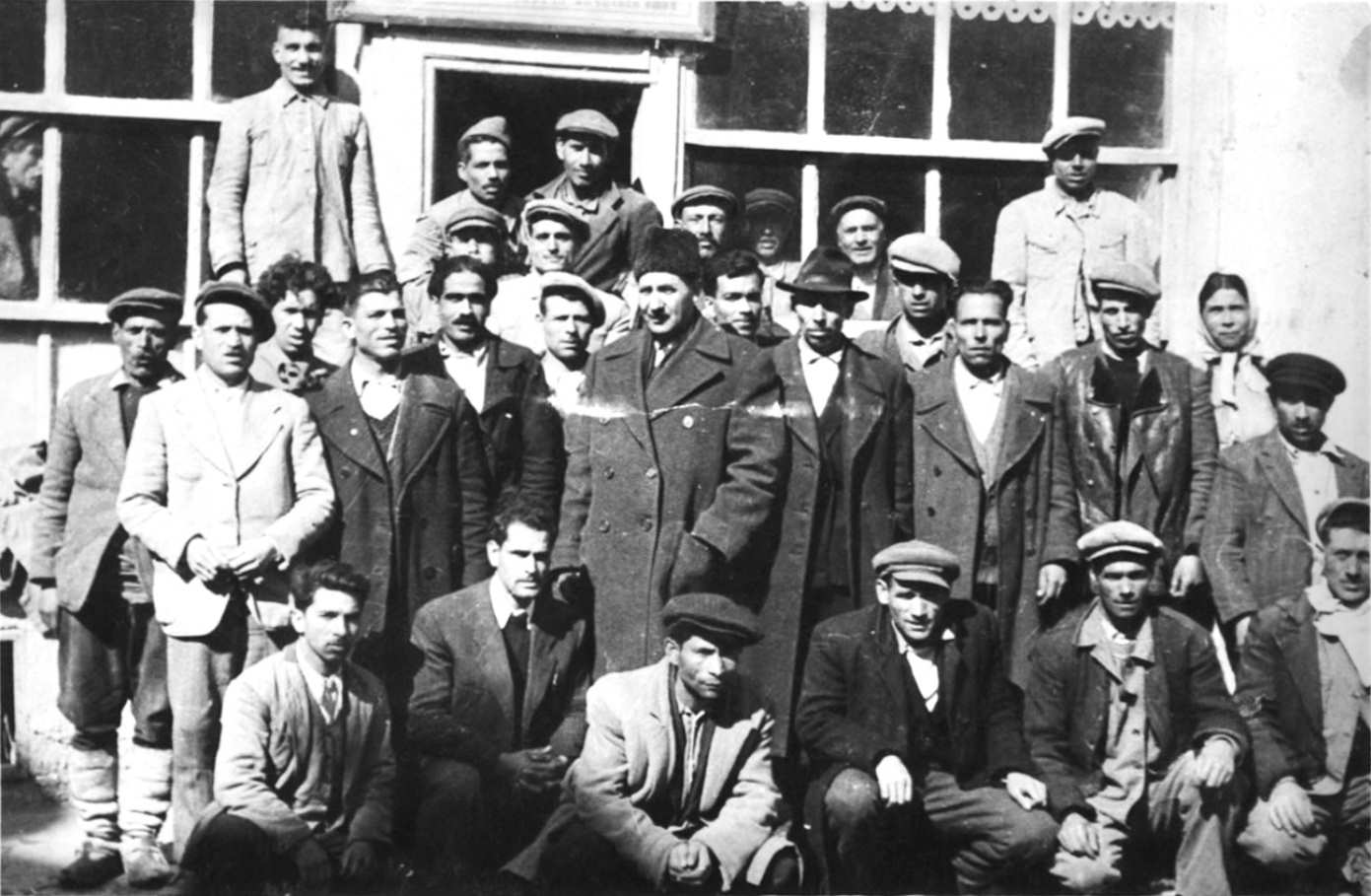
Pashov (centre) at a conference of Roma in Sofia, 1949

Following the 1944 Bulgarian coup d'état the foundation of the People's Republic of Bulgaria, Pashov's importance increased, as the BCP-led Fatherland Front sought to obtain the support of minorities. He was the founder and leader of Ekhipe (lit. 'Unity'), a body to promote Romani culture, after its establishment on 6 March 1945. He was elected to the Grand National Assembly in 1946 or 1947, becoming the first Roma member of parliament in Bulgaria's history.

During this period, Pashov played a substantial role in dictating Romani policy. His friendship with communist leader Georgi Dimitrov, which began in 1923, led to Pashov's policies of korenizatsiia towards the Roma being promoted at a national level. Pashov was active as a member of the National Assembly, travelling across the country to advocate for the involvement of Roma in managing waqf endowments, establish Romani cooperatives and support the spread of Ekhipe's activities throughout Bulgaria. He also contributed to the Dimitrov Constitution, writing amendments forbidding hatred against racial, national and religious groups and providing rights for minority languages and cultures. Pashov also founded the Romano Esi newspaper and the Roma Central Gypsy Theatre.

== Downfall, later life and death ==
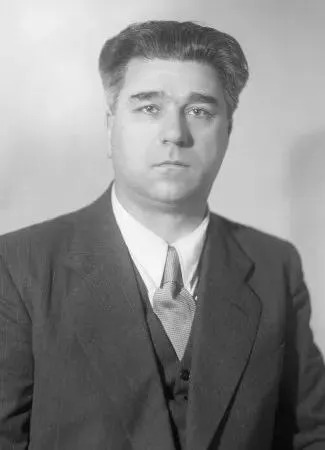
The rise of Valko Chervenkov marked the end of Pashov's political influence and the beginning of efforts to Bulgarise the Roma

After Dimitrov's death in 1949, Pashov's influence quickly waned, particularly as the pro-Bulgarisation Valko Chervenkov came to power. Romani-language press ceased to be published and Romani organisations were folded into the Fatherland Front. Pashov was arrested on 7 April 1950 and sent to Belene labour camp. He was accused of providing state secrets to Nikola Petkov and the Bulgarian Agrarian National Union, as well as supporting Romani nationalism.

Pashov was released from Belene in 1956, following a plenum of the BCP. In 1959, he was again interned alongside his family, this time in the village of Rogozina. Pashov worked as a blacksmith in Rogozina until 1962, when he was permitted to return to Sofia. There, he was head of a local branch of the Fatherland Front, and his party membership was restored in 1967. Despite his party membership being reinstated, Pashov remained excluded from official historiography of the Roma until 1974.

Pashov died on 5 October 1981. His funeral was held in accordance with Islamic custom. At his funeral, he was eulogised by playwright and folklorist Mustafa Aliyev, who pledged to continue his work for the Romani community. Aliyev, whose name was later changed to Manush Romanov, became a member of the National Assembly in 1990. Academic Ognyan Isayev wrote in 2024 that Pashov's political activities made him the "Father of the Roma Movement in Bulgaria"; likewise, academic Lilyana Kovacheva refers to him as the "apostle of the Roma".
