= Belene =

Belene Белене
- Town
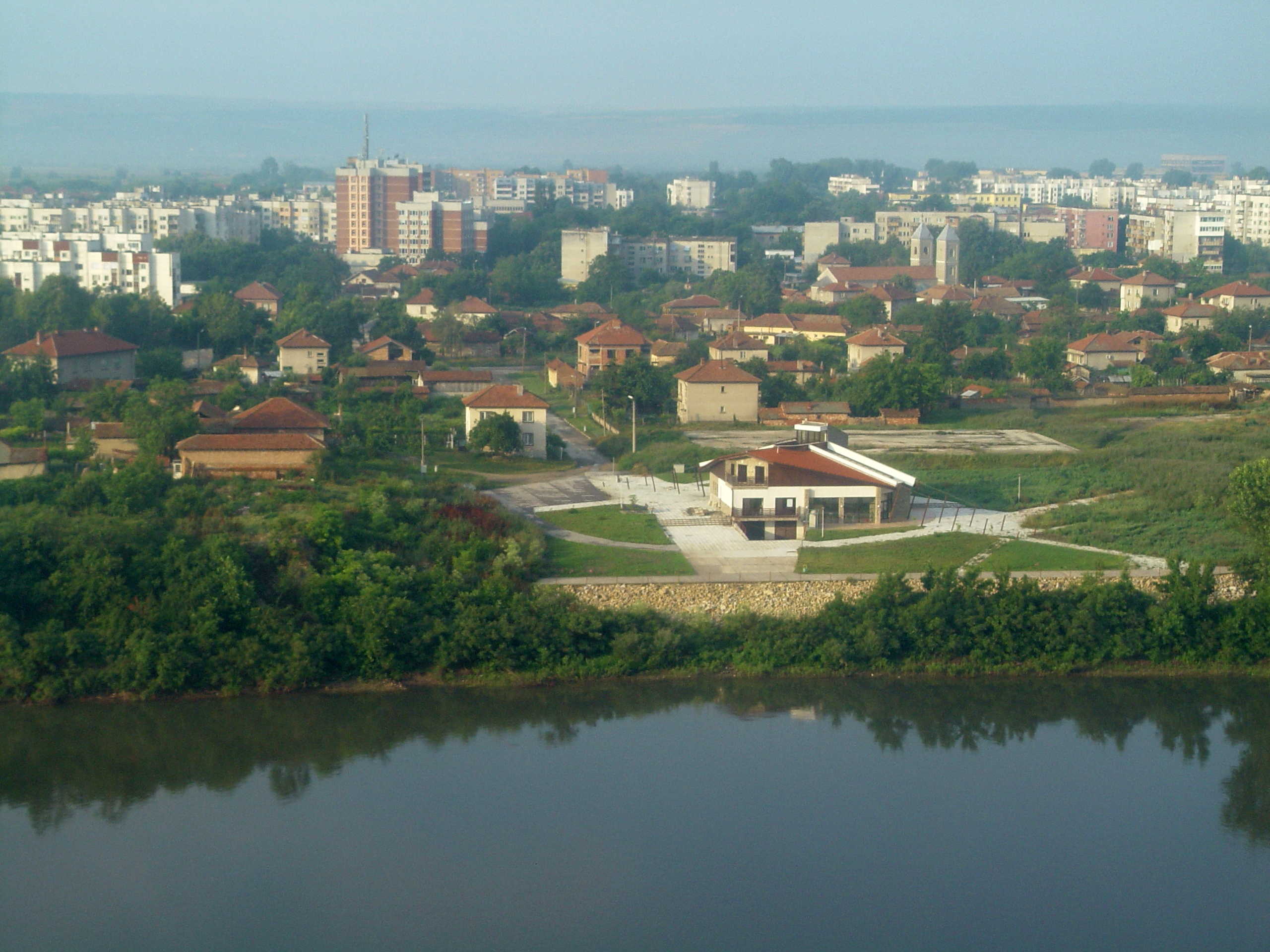

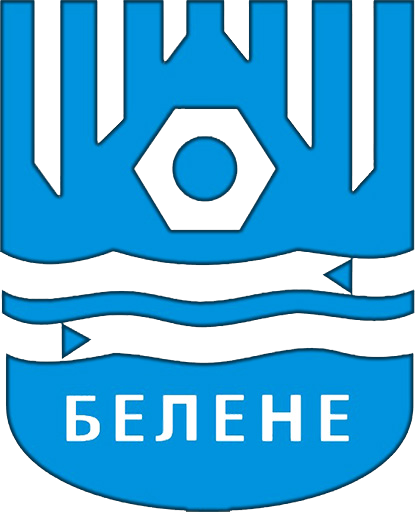
- Coat of arms

- Location within Bulgaria
- Coordinates: 43°39′N 25°7′E
- Country: Bulgaria
- Province (Oblast): Pleven

Government
  - Mayor: Milen Dulev
- Elevation: 89 ft (27 m)

Population (2020)
  - Total: 7,487
- Time zone: UTC+2 (Eastern European Time)
  - Summer (DST): UTC+3 (Eastern European Summer Time)
- Postal code: 5930
- Area code: 0658
- Website: http://belene.bg/

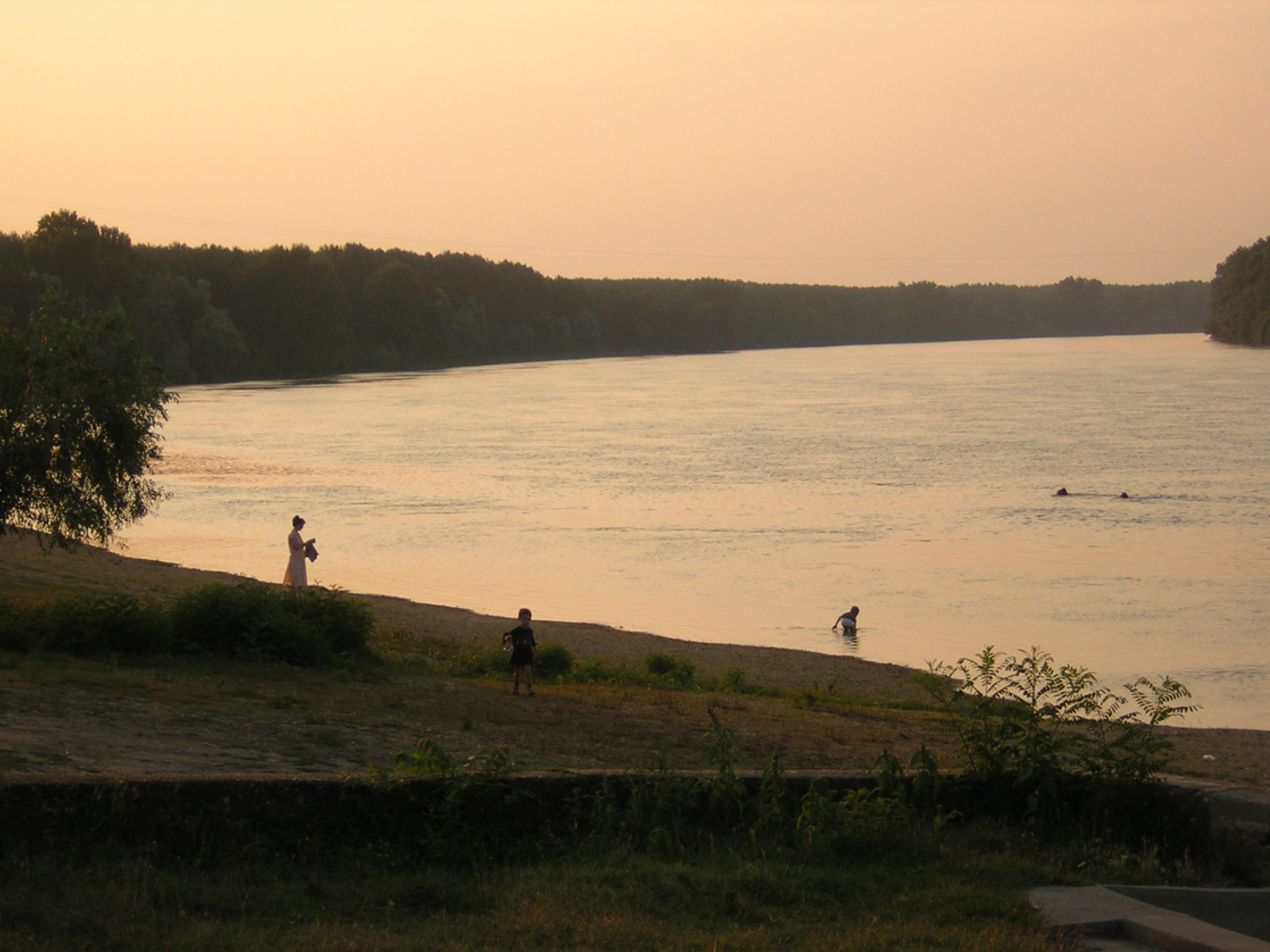
The Danube at Belene

Belene Island

Belene (Bulgarian: Белене [ˈbɛlɛnɛ]) is a town in Pleven Province, Northern Bulgaria. It is the administrative centre of the homonymous Belene Municipality. The town is situated on the right bank of the Danube river, close to the town of Svishtov.

== Geography ==
=== Location ===
Belene is located in Pleven Province - 60 km northeast of the regional centre of Pleven and near the town of Svishtov - 26 km. Other nearby towns are Nikopol - 37 km west of Belene and Levski to the south - 46 km.

Belene Municipality is located in the northern central part of the Danube Plain, on the northern state border of Bulgaria with Romania . The territory of the municipality is 285,046 decares (285 km²), of which 12,110 decares are the “settlements” fund. For its area it is one of the small municipalities in Bulgaria. It consists of six settlements - the municipal center of Belene and five villages - Dekov, Tatari, Petokladentsi, Kulina voda and Byala voda. The number of inhabitants in the Municipality accounts to 9891.

=== Climate ===
Belene has a continental climate (Köppen climate classification Dfa) The winters are one of the coldest in Bulgaria but in the summer it gets very hot.

== History ==
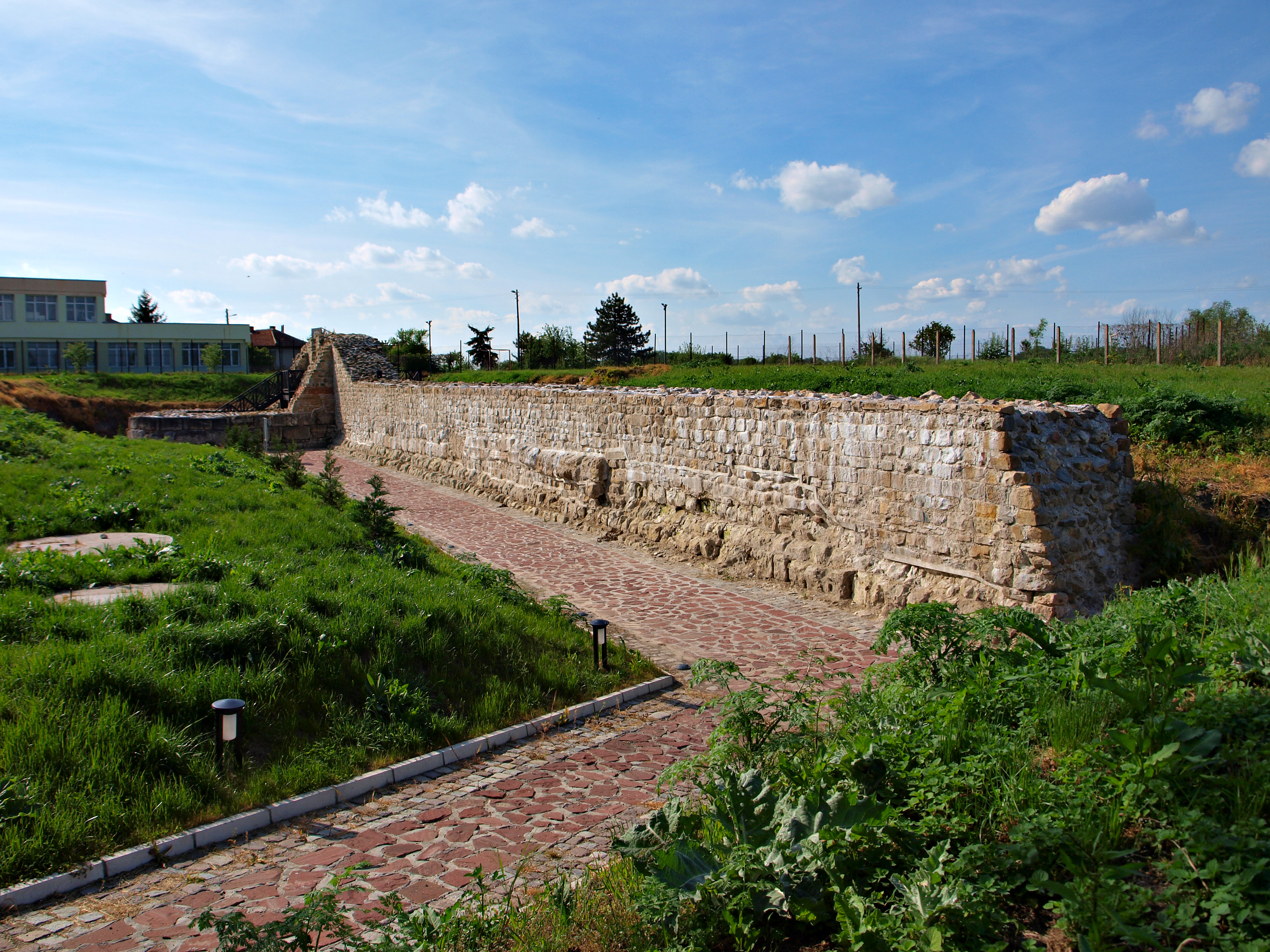
Dimum Roman fort

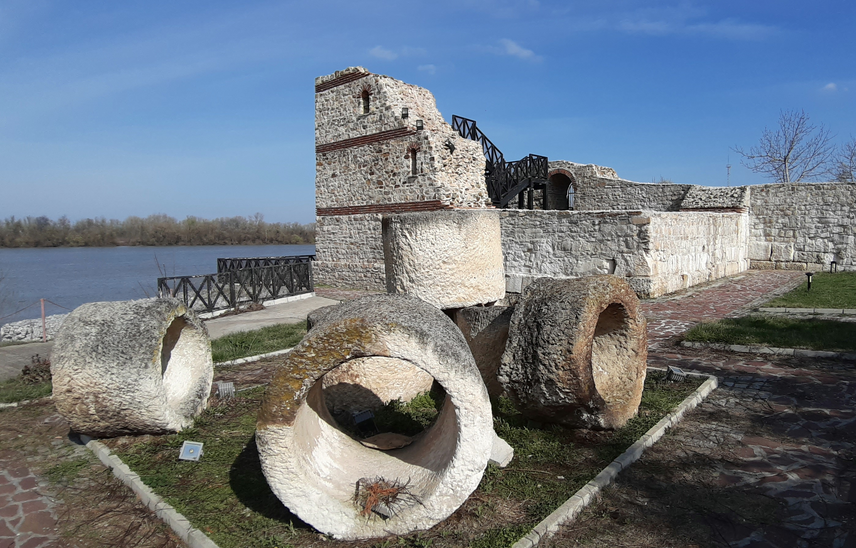
Dimum Roman fort

Five cultural layers have been found in over 20 Thracian mounds. The first ones date from the Late Neolithic, continue through the Bronze and Copper Ages and are evidence of continuous life in these places. From the 4th century BC until the beginning of the 1st century BC the site was inhabited by the Thracian tribe Getae, also called Dimenzi.

It was the site of the Roman fort and customs station, Dimum, from the 1st century AD in the Roman province of Moesia. In the time of the first Roman Emperor Augustus the fortress was the most north-eastern point of Moesia on the frontier with the Thracian kingdom. From the beginning of the 2nd to end of 3rd century a cavalry regiment was stationed there and which probably rebuilt the fort. The site has been partially excavated and more than 60 m of the walls with the western gate.

The available data determine its origin in 1086, when part of the Paulician population after the suppression of the Thracian uprising left the surroundings of Plovdiv and settled near the destroyed and depopulated ancient Roman fortress Dimum (Dum).

In the Middle Ages the settlement was called Dunavgrad (Tunaburgos). Traces of a Slavic settlement and an earth fortification have been found in the vicinity of Belene. There is no summary information about the settlement for the period from the 5th to the 15th century.

The village is mentioned in Ottoman registers from 1479/80, at that time it was a Paulician village with 49 households. Later, the Paulicians from the village converted to Catholicism. About 18 names of the settlement are known from the history and legends. The most popular are: Dimum, Pavlikjansko Belene, Beljansko, Beleni. The Paulicians who settled in it profess one of the varieties of the Bogomilism. On the one hand, they opposed Christianity, and on the other, they did not want to accept Islam. In order to save and mitigate the Turkish atrocities from 1605 to 1620, the Paulicians were converted to the Catholic faith by the Bosnian Catholic missionary Bishop Petar Solinat. Despite its admission into the bosom of the Roman Catholic Church, the population retains its language and nationality. The adoption of the Catholic faith has a beneficial effect on the development of Belene.

According to Lyubomir Miletich after the pogrom of the Chiprovtsi uprising in 1688, about 2,000 people from Belene moved to Wallachia to escape the Turkish atrocities. After a while, some of them returned, but some had already adopted the Romanian language and customs. After the Russo-Turkish War of Liberation from 1877-1878, the Turks emigrated and Bulgarians from the Gabrovo, Elena, Tryavna and Tarnovo regions settled, leaving Belene with a purely Bulgarian population.

On 7 September 1964 Belene was proclaimed a city. Here was located the biggest labour camp in Bulgaria (Belene labour camp) after the BCP gained power in 1944. It was constructed on the island of Persin (also known as Belene Island) in the Danube in Spring of 1949.

== Religion ==
The main confessions in the town are Roman Catholicism and Eastern Orthodoxy, with two Roman Catholic and one Orthodox church being present. The Catholic Church of the Blessed Virgin Mary was built in 1860, the Eastern Orthodox Church of St George in 1874 and the Catholic Church of Saint Anthony of Padua was constructed in 1893.

Belene is the birthplace of Blessed Bishop Eugene Bosilkov (1900–1952), a martyr for the faith and beatified on 15 March 1998 in St. Peter's Basilica by Pope John Paul II In the Church of the Nativity of the Blessed Virgin Mary is the Sanctuary with a piece of the relics of Monsignor Bosilkov - a place of worship for believing Christians.

Belene was proclaimed a town in 1964, which is celebrated every year in the first week of September with a market and cultural events.

== Economy ==
Although about 40% of construction worked and 80% of equipment deliveries for the first unit had been completed in 1991, construction was suspended owing to a lack of financial resources. In 2002, the Government decided to resume the Belene NPP Project and in 2005, the Council of Ministers issued a decision for construction of two 1000 MW units. However, the Council of Ministers decision about the Belene NPP Project was subsequently suspended in 2012. In 2018, the Minister of Energy was assigned to again explore possibilities for construction of the Belene NPP until it was interrupted in 1990 due to the severe economic crisis that followed the fall of communism in the country. There are plans to start construction again as a replacement for reactors 3 and 4 at Kozloduy Nuclear Power Plant, which Bulgaria shut down as a condition for EU membership. The total capacity of the two reactors will be 2,000 MW.

== In popular culture ==
Belene was the focal point for the feature documentary film The Mosquito Problem and Other Stories by Andrey Paounov. The film features some of the town's characters, highlighting their daily plight of a nuclear plant of empty promises and a year-round mosquito epidemic.

== Notable people ==
=== Born in Belene ===
- Eugene Bossilkov (1900 – 1952), member of the Passionist Congregation, Roman Catholic bishop of Nikopol and martyr in the Communist campaign in Bulgaria against religion
- Mihail Borozenkov, adventurer
- Karl Raev (1881 – 1967), catholic priest
- Nikola Aleksiev (.... – 1964), first legislator from Belene

=== Lived in Belene ===
- Damjan Talev (1911 – 1998), catholic priest
- Petko Hristov (1950 – 2020) Roman Catholic bishop of Nikopol
- Paolo Kortezi (born 1974), catholic priest, passionist

=== Died in Belene ===
- Ilolito Agosto (1838 – 1893), Roman Catholic bishop of Nikopol
- Alexander Girginov (1879 – 1953), politician
- Dimitar Savov (1887 – 1951), politician
- Ignat Badov (1919 – 2001), catholic priest, resurrectionist

== Twin towns – sister cities ==
Belene is twinned with:

- Belleville-sur-Loire, France
- Devrek, Turkey
- Hajdúsámson, Hungary
- Lázně Bělohrad, Czech Republic
- Obninsk, Russia
- Popești-Leordeni, Romania
- Vigonza, Italy
