= Tatari, Pleven Province =

Tatari Татари
- Village
- Tatari
- Location within Bulgaria
- Coordinates: 43°33′38″N 25°10′00″E

Population
  - Total: 226

Tatari is a village in Bulgaria. It is located in Belene Municipality, Pleven Province.
