= Haralan Popov =

Bulgarian minister (1907–1988)

- Born: March 7, 1907; Krasno Gradishte, Bulgaria
- Died: November 14, 1988 (aged 81); Glendale, California, United States
- Occupation: Minister
- Spouse: Ruth Popov
- Children: 2

Haralan Popov (Bulgarian: Харалан Попов) (March 7, 1907 – November 14, 1988) was a Protestant minister who spent thirteen years in Bulgarian communist prisons on charges of treason. He later founded Door of Hope International, a Christian relief and development organization.

== Biography ==
Haralan Popov was born in the small Bulgarian village of Krasno Gradishte. Although initially an atheist, Popov became a Christian as a teenager. In 1929 he was accepted as pastor in the Bulgarian Pentecostal Church. Shortly after attending Bible School in London, he married a Swedish woman, Ruth. He returned to Bulgaria before the outbreak of World War II.

In 1948, in the capital city of Sofia, he was arrested on charges of espionage against the state. After eight months in prison, Popov, and other ministers who had been arrested with him, pleaded guilty through a cruel, forced confession. Popov was sentenced to 15 years in prison. He spent the next 13 years and two months in prison. He was released on September 25, 1961, and joined his family in Sweden a year later.

After moving to the United States in 1970, Popov founded Evangelism to Communist Lands Inc., now known as Door of Hope International to bring Bibles and relief to people in oppressive countries in 1972. He recorded his testimony and prison experiences in his autobiography Tortured For His Faith: An Epic of Christian Courage and Heroism in Our Day.

In October 1988, during Glasnost, and for the first time in 26 years, Popov was permitted by Bulgarian authorities to visit the church he pastored in Bulgaria. He died the next month on November 14, 1988, in Glendale, California, of complications related to cancer.

== See also ==
- Richard Wurmbrand – A Romanian defector to the United States under similar circumstances
