= Diocese of Nicopolis =

Catholic diocese in Bulgaria

Diocese of Nicopolis Dioecesis Nicopolitanus Епархия Никопол

Catholic
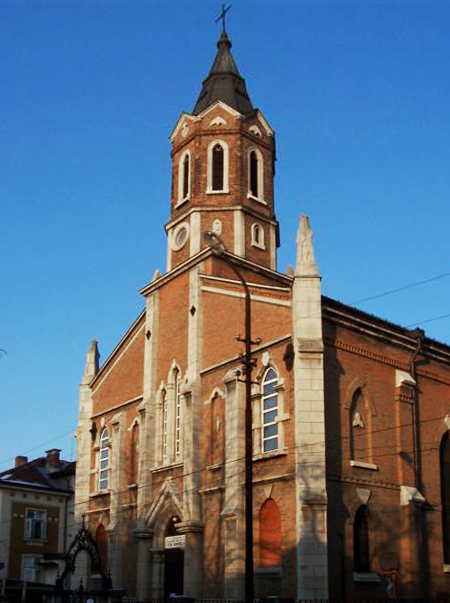
- The Cathedral of St Paul of the Cross in Ruse, Bulgaria

Location
- Country: Bulgaria
- Metropolitan: Immediately Subject to the Holy See

Statistics
- Area: 43,241 km^{2} (16,695 sq mi)
- Population: Total; Catholics: (as of 2021); 2,500,000 (Note: Annuario Pontificio (2022) via Catholic-Hierarchy.org); 25,000 (1%)
- Parishes: 21

Information
- Denomination: Catholic Church
- Sui iuris church: Latin Church
- Rite: Latin Rite
- Established: 1648; 378 years ago (suffragan to Sofia); 1789; 237 years ago (subject to the Holy See)
- Cathedral: St Paul of the Cross Cathedral, Rousse
- Secular priests: 4 plus 9 religious priests
- Language: Bulgarian
- Calendar: General Roman

Current leadership
- Pope: Leo XIV
- Bishop: sede vacante
- Bishops emeritus: Strahil Kavalenov

Website
- diocesi-nicopoli.bg

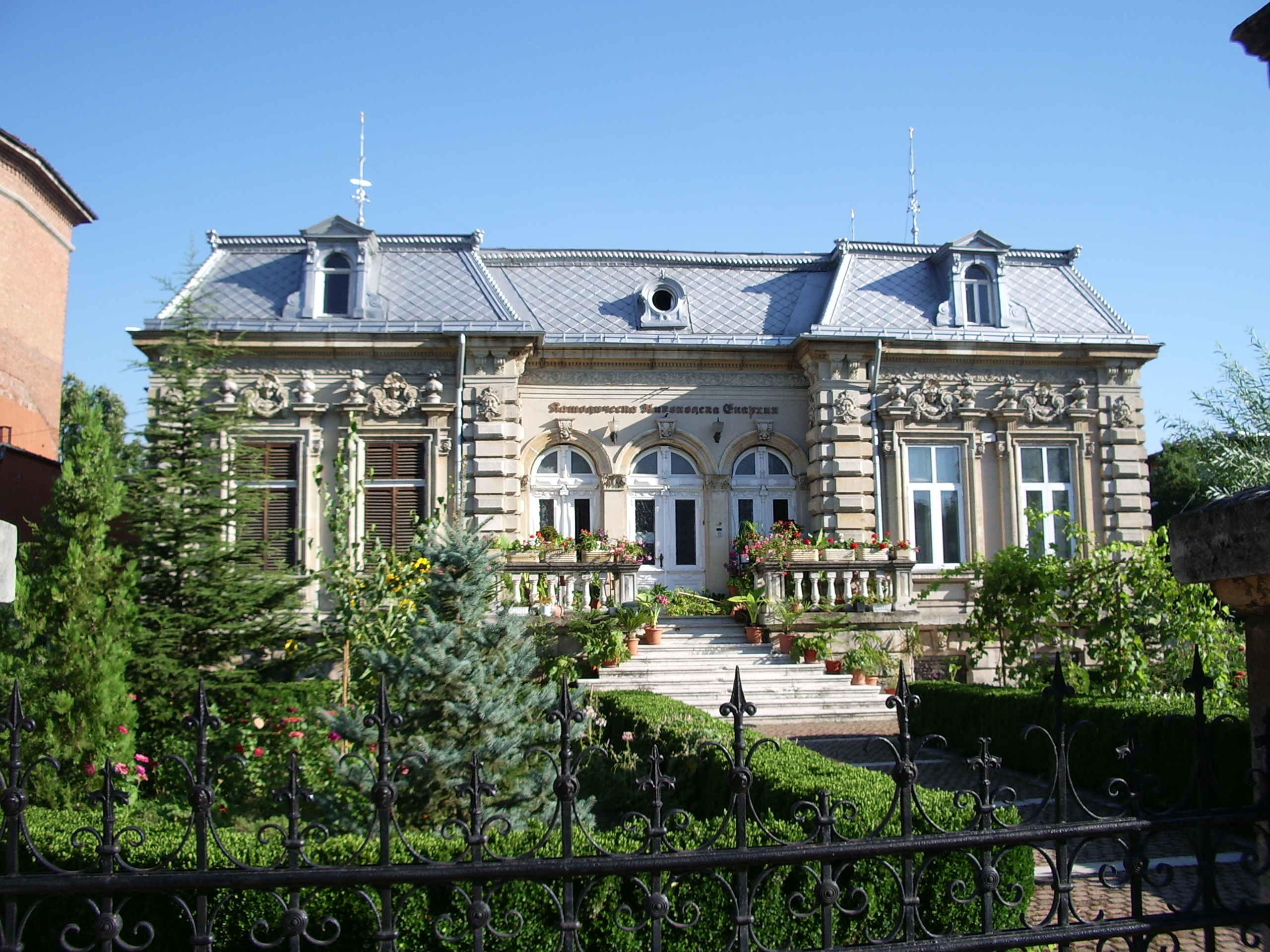
The Diocese of Nicopolis building in Rousse

The Diocese of Nicopolis (Note: Alternate spellings include Nicopoli and Nikopol) (Latin: Dioecesis Nicopolitanus) is a Latin diocese of the Catholic Church, which includes the whole northern part of Bulgaria. The seat of the episcopal see is in Rousse, although the diocese is named after Nicopolis ad Istrum. The diocese is immediately subject to the Holy See.

== History ==
Originally erected in 1789, the diocese has not experienced any name changes, nor jurisdictional alterations.

List of ordinaries of the diocese of Nicopoli
Name	Appointed	Term End	Term end reason
Philippus Stanislaus	1648	1663	
Francesco Sojmirović	1663	1673	Died
Philippus Stanislaus	1673	1674	Died (Note: Year of death uncertain)
Anton Stefanov (Stephani), O.F.M. Obs.	1677	1692	Died
Marko Andrijašević (Andreassi)	1717	1723	Appointed archbishop of Sardica (Sredek, Sofia)
Balthasar Lieschi	1724	unknown	
Nicola Stanislavich, O.F.M. Obs.	1725	1740	Confirmed bishop of Csanád
Antun Becić	1743	1752	Resigned
Nicola Pugliesi	1752	1767	Appointed archbishop of Dubrovnik (Ragusa)
Sebastiano Canepa	1767	1769	Died
Giacomo Antonio Riccardini, O.F.M. Conv.	1771	1775	Resigned
Paul Dovanlia	1776	1804	Died
Francesco Maria Ferreri, C.P.	1805	1814	Died
Fortunato Maria Ercolani, C.P.	1815	1822	Appointed bishop of Civita Castellana, Orte e Gallese
Giuseppe-Maria Molajoni	1825	1847	Resigned
Angelo Parsi	1847	1863	Died
Antonius Jozef Pluym C.P.	1863	1870	Resigned
Ignazio Paoli, C.P.	1870	1883	Appointed archbishop (personal title) of Bucuresti
Ippolito Agosto, C.P.	1883	1893	Died
Henri Doulcet, C.P.	1895	1913	Resigned
Leonardo Baumbach, C.P.	1913	1915	Died
Damiaan Johannes Theelen, C.P.	1915	1946	Died
Blessed Eugene Bossilkov, C.P.	1947	1952	Died
Vasco Séirécov	1975	1977	Died
Samuel Dzhundrin, A.A.	1978 (Note: Dzhundrin was appointed bishop in 1978, but not ordained and installed until 1979)	1994	Retired
Petko Christov, O.F.M. Conv.	1994	2020	Died
Strahil Kavalenov	2021	2026	Resigned

== See also ==
- Catholic Church in Bulgaria
