= Persina Nature Park =

Wetland in Bulgaria

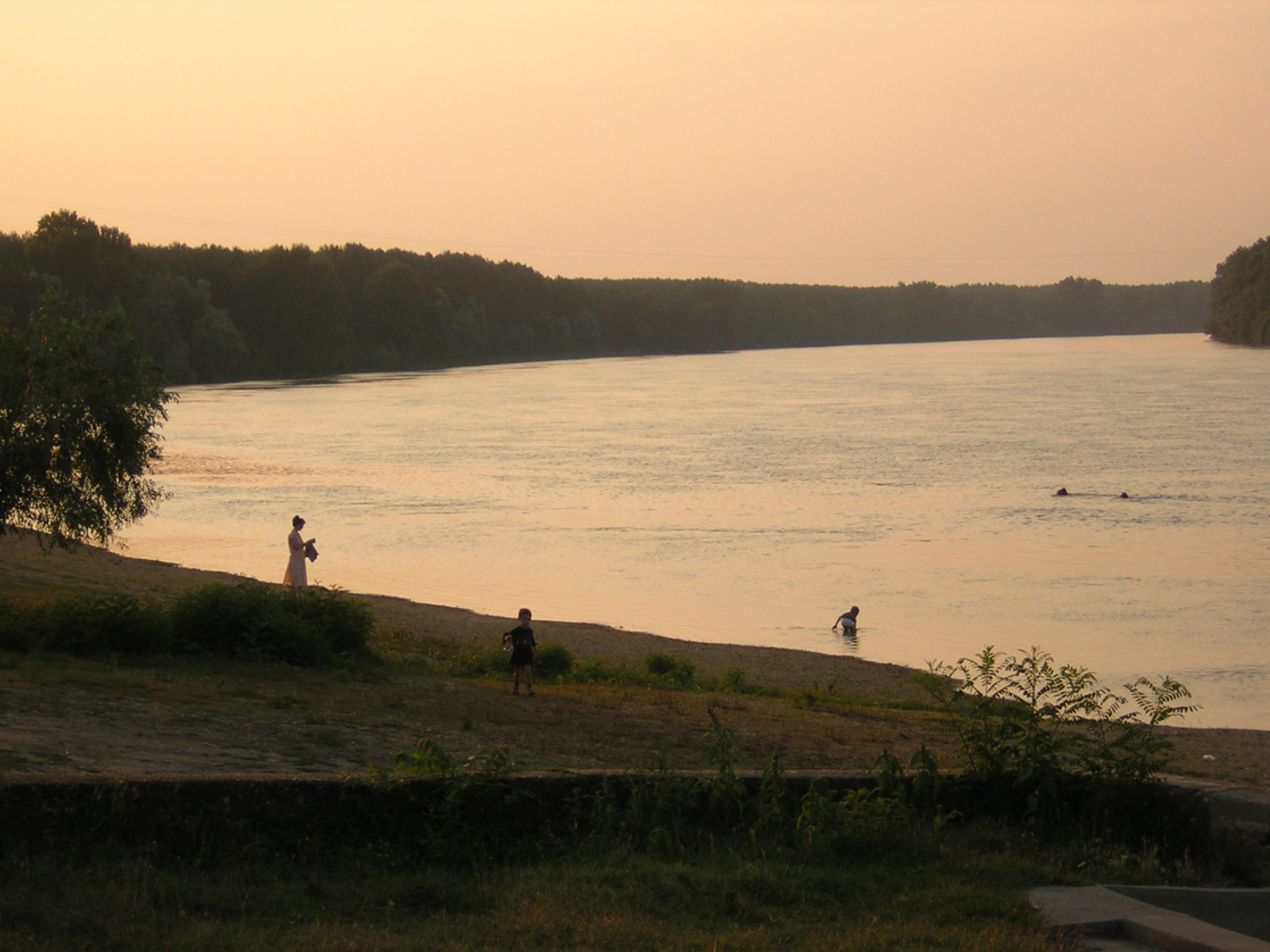
- The Danube between Belene and Persin Island
- Interactive map of Persina Nature Park
- Location: Belene, Bulgaria
- Coordinates: 43°40′N 25°10′E
- Area: 21,762 ha (53,780 acres)
- Created: December 4, 2000
- Website: www.persina.bg

Ramsar Wetland
- Official name: Belene Islands Complex
- Designated: 24 September 2002
- Reference no.: 1226

Persina Nature Park (Bulgarian: Природен парк Персина) is a wetland area along the Bulgarian side of the Danube that was established on December 4, 2000. Situated on the territory of three municipalities (Nikopol, Belene and Svishtov), it covers 21,762 ha (53,780 acres). The designation of the park aims at conservation and restoration of Danube wetlands. Special attention is paid to the numerous islands and their natural status. The park is named after Persin Island, which is part of the Belene Islands Complex. It is 15 km (9.3 mi) long and 6 km (3.7 mi) wide, making it the fourth largest Danube island and the largest in Bulgaria. Another island group is located near Nikopol. Because of its uniqueness and high importance, the island group was proclaimed a Ramsar site on September 24, 2002. At 18,330 ha (45,300 acres), it is the largest such site in Bulgaria. The most significant ecosystems within the park are the flooded forests along the Danube and the inland marshes. In order to protect these habitats, several protected areas have been established. A visitor centre for the park is located in Belene.
