= Belene labour camp =

Forced labour camp in Bulgaria

Coordinates: 43°39′28″N 25°08′18″E

Map of Belene Island

The Belene labour camp, also referred to as Belene concentration camp, was part of the network of forced labour camps in Communist Bulgaria. It was located on the Belene Island, between two branches of the Danube river. At the height of Valko Chervenkov's repressions in 1952, the camp had 2,323 inmates - 2,248 men and 75 women.

The Belene Prison is still operating as a penitentiary in the western part of the island, while the eastern part is a managed natural reserve.

This camp operated officially from 1949 to 1959, though a break in deportations to Belene occurred from 1954 to 1956. Between 1985 and 1989 Turks in Bulgaria who resisted the policy of changing Turkish names and surnames to Bulgarian ones, (see Revival Process) were imprisoned in the prison on Belene. During those years, the Turkish Radio and Television Corporation broadcast a series named "Belene Adası" (Belene Island) on the policies of the Bulgarian government against Bulgarian Turks.

From 1949 onward, Evangelical Christian pastors in particular were targeted as "enemies of the State" and sent to Belene. In 1949, the infamous "Pastors' Trial" was conducted, trying 13 Protestant pastors as "spies". The men received sentences of varying lengths. Haralan Popov, who survived and later founded the mission "Door of Hope International" to bring Bibles behind the Iron Curtain, published his autobiography under the Bulgarian title "The Bulgarian Golgotha". It was later released in English as "Tortured for His Faith".

The camp and some its survivors were the subject of a documentary film by German TV program ZDF Vorwärts aber nie vergessen - Ballade über bulgarische Helden "Moving on, but Never Forgetting - A Ballad of Bulgarian Heroes" directed and authored by Ilija Trojanow.

== Notable inmates ==
- Haralan Popov (1949–1962)
- Konstantin Muraviev (1956–1961)
- Shakir Pashov (1950–1956)
- Lea Ivanova (Late 70s)
- Stoyko Kavrukov (Kavrukov and Perinchev-only successful escape-1953) Belene-The Island of the Forgotten by Nedyalko Geshev, published in Belgium - 1983
- Atanas Perinchev (Kavrukov and Perinchev-only successful escape-1953) Belene-The Island of the Forgotten by Nedyalko Geshev, published in Belgium - 1983

== In popular culture ==
David, from I Am David escapes from Belene in 1952. However the camp shown in the film doesn't resemble the real Belene camp, as it is located inland in a mountainous area rather than on a river island.
