= St Paul of the Cross Cathedral =

Catholic Cathedral in Rousse, Bulgaria

- Катедрален храм „Свети Павел от Кръста"; Katedralen hram „Sveti Pavel ot Krasta"
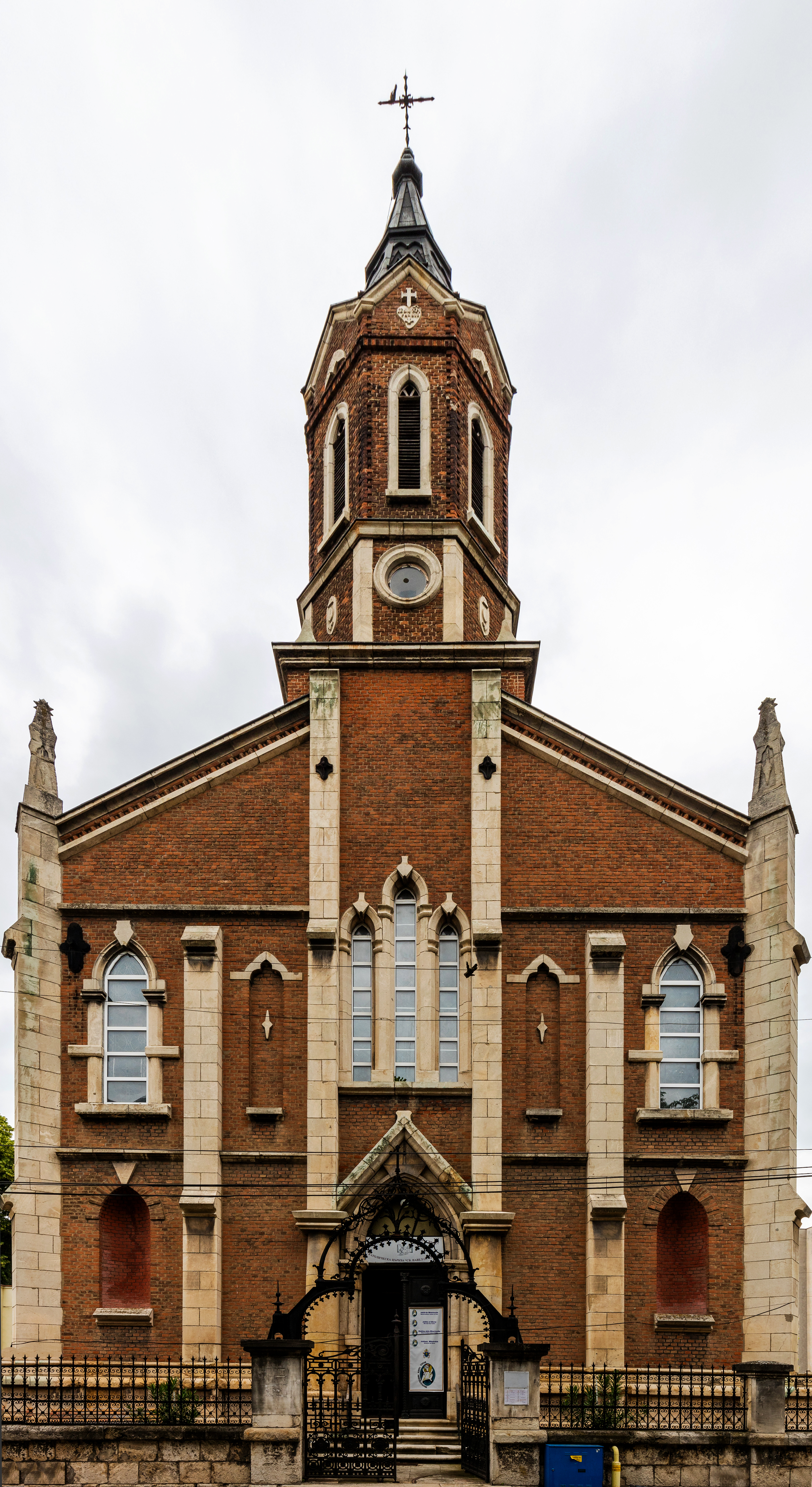
- Cathedral's facade
- St Paul of the Cross Cathedral
- 43°50′56.50″N 25°56′53″E
- Address: ul. Bishop Bossilkov 14, 7000 Ruse
- Country: Bulgaria
- Denomination: Catholic Church
- Sui iuris church: Latin Church
- Website: sveti-pavel.org

Architecture
- Architect: Valentino dell'Antonio-Borcan
- Architectural type: Cathedral
- Style: Brick Gothic
- Years built: 1890–1892

Administration
- Diocese: Nicopoli

The St Paul of the Cross Cathedral (Bulgarian: Катедрален храм „Свети Павел от Кръста", Katedralen hram „Sveti Pavel ot Krasta") is a Catholic cathedral in the city of Rousse in northeastern Bulgaria. It is the cathedral church of the Latin Catholic Diocese of Nicopoli and it is dedicated to Saint Paul of the Cross, founder of the Passionists.

Built in 1890 to the designs of the Austria-Hungarian architect Valentino Dell'Antonio form Moena, the cathedral is an example of Gothic Revival architecture (and Brick Gothic in particular) in the country. The interior is decorated with sculptures and stained glass windows. It was the cathedral church of Blessed Eugene Bossilkov, bishop of Nicopoli, executed by the communists in 1952.

== Organ ==
The pipe organ of the cathedral was installed in 1907. It is the only one of its kind (with pneumatic action and with a Romantic sound) in Southeastern Europe, and was produced by the Voit company from Karlsruhe. It has two manuals and 13 stops. The instrument was damaged by the 1977 Bucharest earthquake and it was fully restored in 2004.

=== Disposition ===
1st manual
- Flauto amabile 8'
- Bordun 16'
- Viola di Gamba 8'
- Prizipal 8'
- Oktave 4'
- Cornett 3-4 fach
2nd manual
- Salicional 8'
- Vox coelestis 8'
- Liebl.Gedeckt 8'
- Rohrflote 4'
- G.Prizipal 8'
Pedalboard
- Zartbass 16'
- Subbass 16'

== Gallery ==
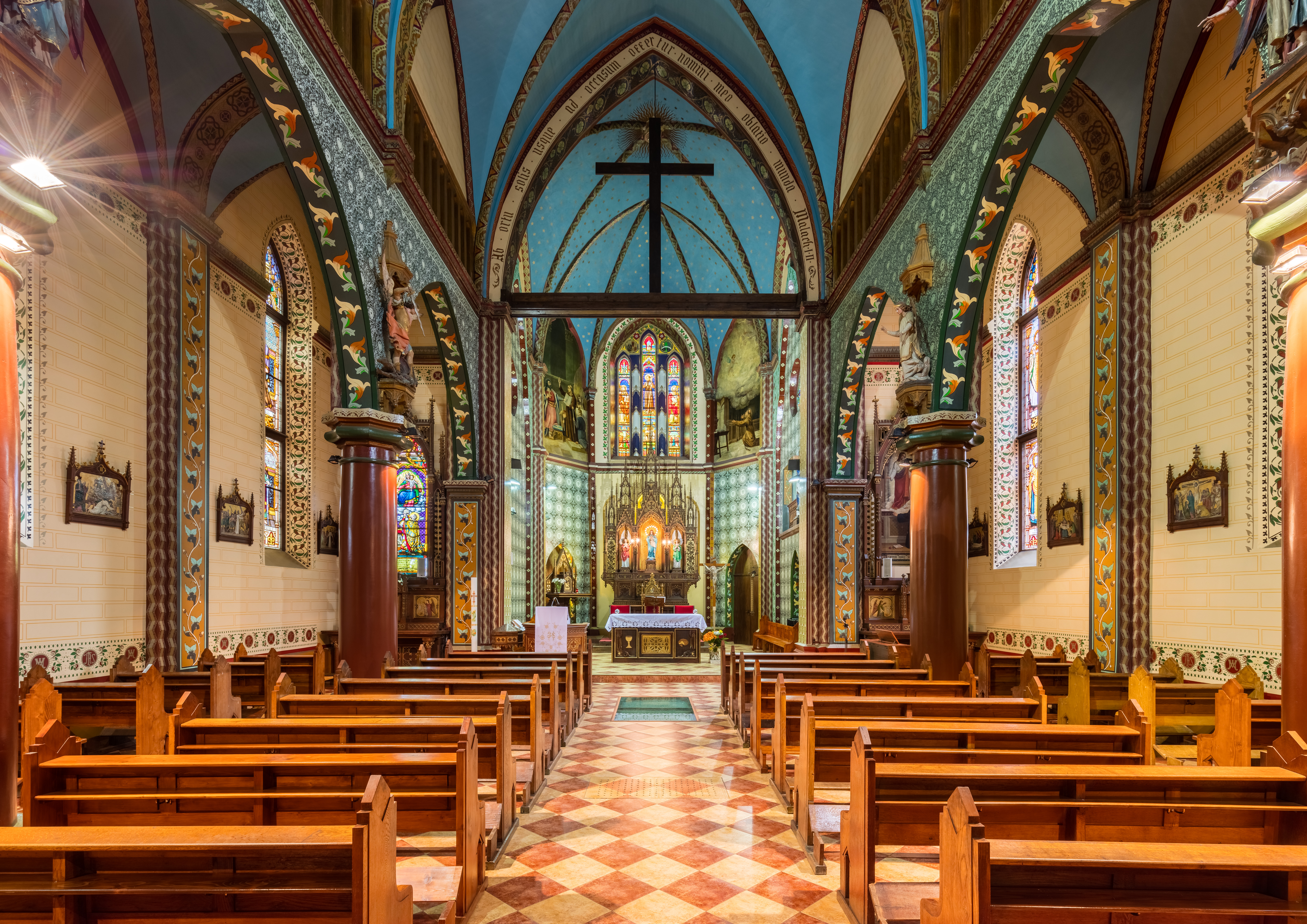
Interior detail

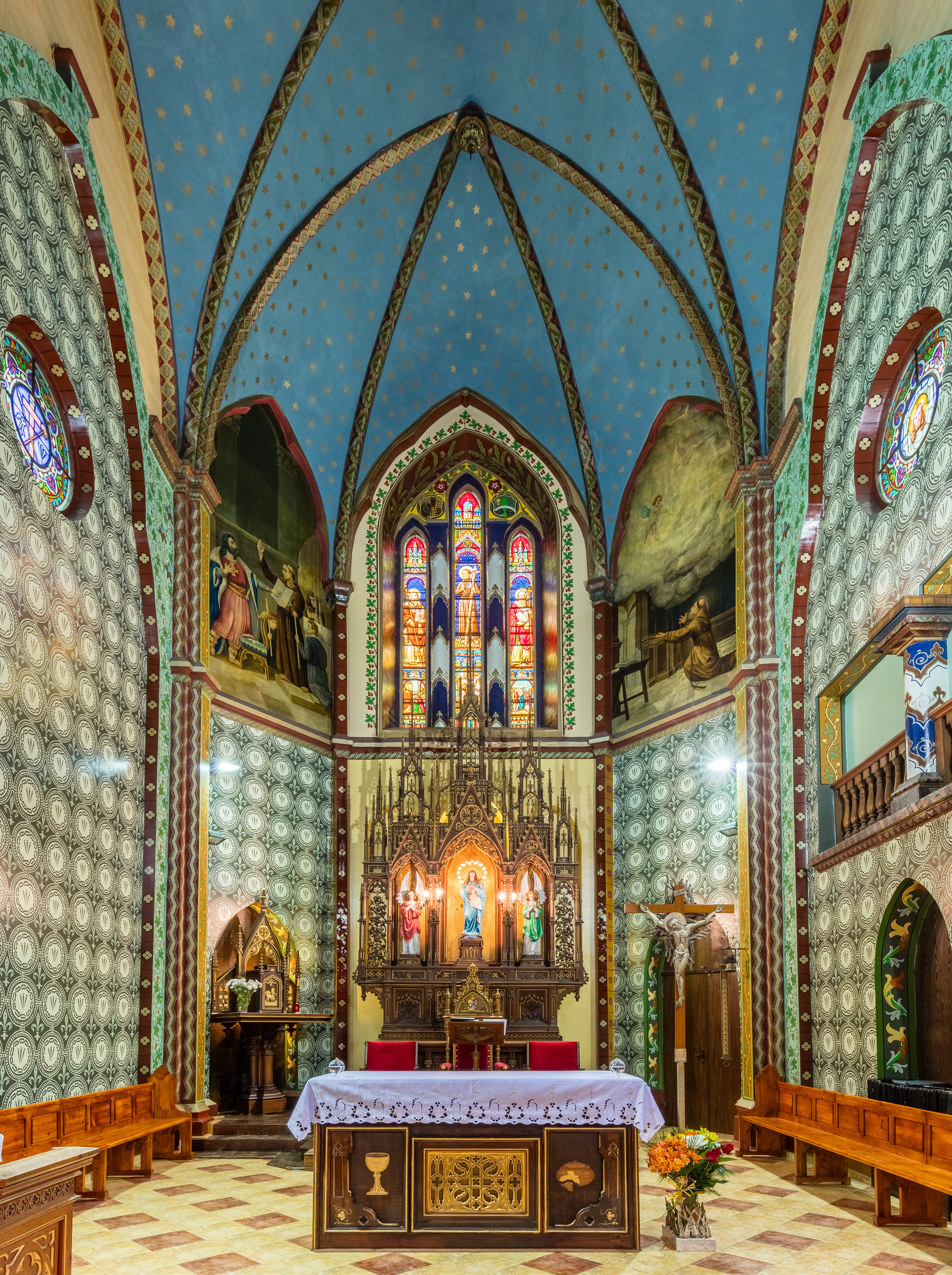
The altar

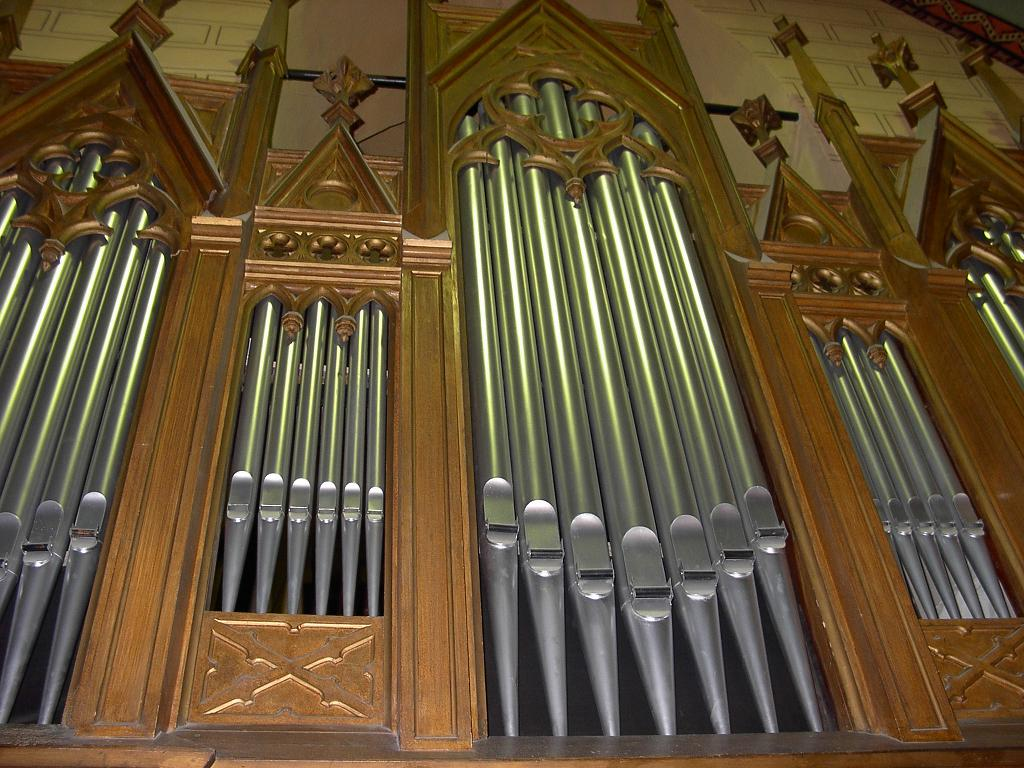
The organ

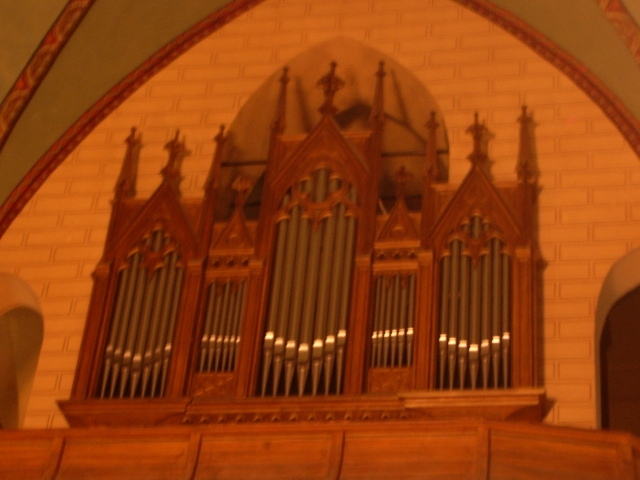
The organ

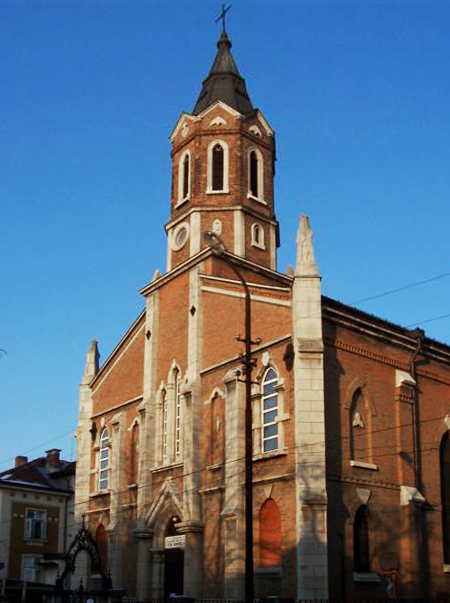
Exterior

== See also ==
- Catholic Church in Bulgaria
