= Episcopal Conference of Bulgaria =

Assembly of Catholic bishops of Bulgaria

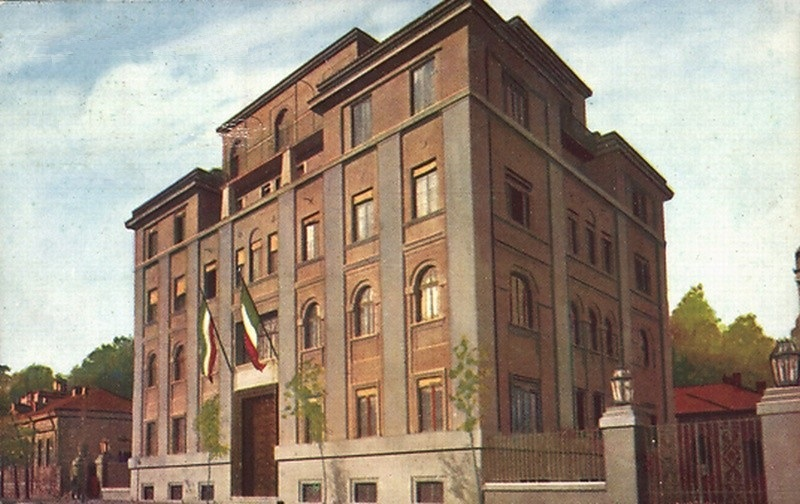
Headquarters in 1928

Episcopal conference of Bulgaria (Latin: Conferentia episcoporum Bulgariæ) is an ecclesiastical institution, consisting of bishops of the Catholic dioceses in the country. It is bi-ritual because it includes in its composition dioceses in Latin and Byzantine-Slavic rites. Episcopal Conference in Bulgaria is the governing body of the Catholic Church in Bulgaria and performs almost the same features as the Holy Synod in Orthodox churches.

== Background and purpose ==
In each country the Catholic bishops gather in the Bishops' conference to solve common problems of faith and the local Catholic Church. First National Episcopal Conference in the world was created in 1830 in Belgium. There are currently over 100 national episcopal conferences, which cover the whole of that country. There are 15 episcopal conferences involving more than one party, such as the Episcopal Conferences of the Holy Land or Scandinavia.

Over a long period of time, there are informal gatherings of bishops of a region, but the Second Vatican Council officially established this institution in the Catholic Church with the Decree of Bishops pastoral activity "Christus Dominus", published in 1965 by Pope Paul VI. The same Pope with his motu proprio "Ecclesiæ sanctæ" 1966 orders were added to create some clarity of council documents, including for "Christus Dominus". Actions, rights and obligations of the Bishops' Conferences are governed by the Code of canon law in 1983 (canons 447-459). The nature of the conferences and their teaching authority is governed by the motu proprio of Pope John Paul II "Apostolos suos" 1998.

== Composition ==
Mgr. Christo Proykov - Chairman of the conference and Exarch of Sofia

Mgr. Gheorghi Ivanov Jovcev - Sofia - Bishop of Sofia-Plovdiv

Mgr. Strahil Kavalenov - Bishop of Nikopol

Father Srecko Rimats OCD - Secretary

== Structure ==
Bishops' Conference in Bulgaria has the following structure:

- Commission for Clergy
- Commission for institutes of consecrated life and societies of apostolic life
- Commission for the Divine Cult and Discipline of Sacraments
- Commission for Catholic Education and qualifications
- Council for Pastoral Care over migrants and travelers
- Council for Pastoral Care over health service
- Council "Iustitia et Pax"
- Council to support Christian Unity
- Council "Cor unum"
- Council for families
- Council for secular parties
- Council for catechism

== See also ==
- Catholicism in Bulgaria
