= Eugene Bossilkov =

Roman Catholic bishop

Blessed Eugene Bossilkov C.P.
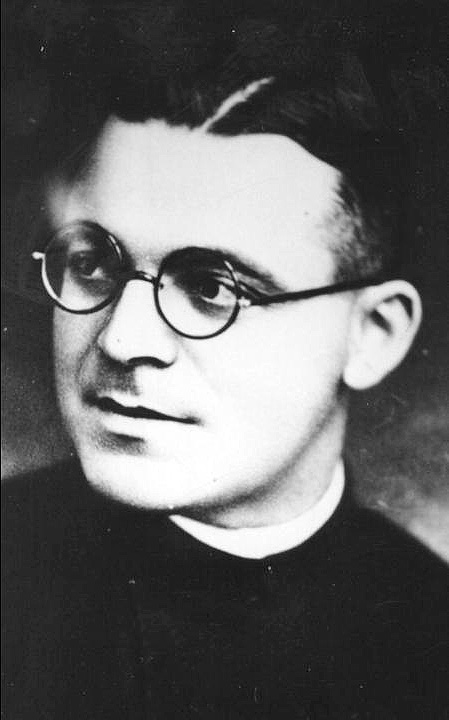

Bishop, Martyr
- Born: November 16, 1900
- Died: November 11, 1952 (aged 51)
- Venerated in: Roman Catholic Church
- Beatified: 15 March 1998, Rome, Italy by Pope John Paul II
- Feast: November 13

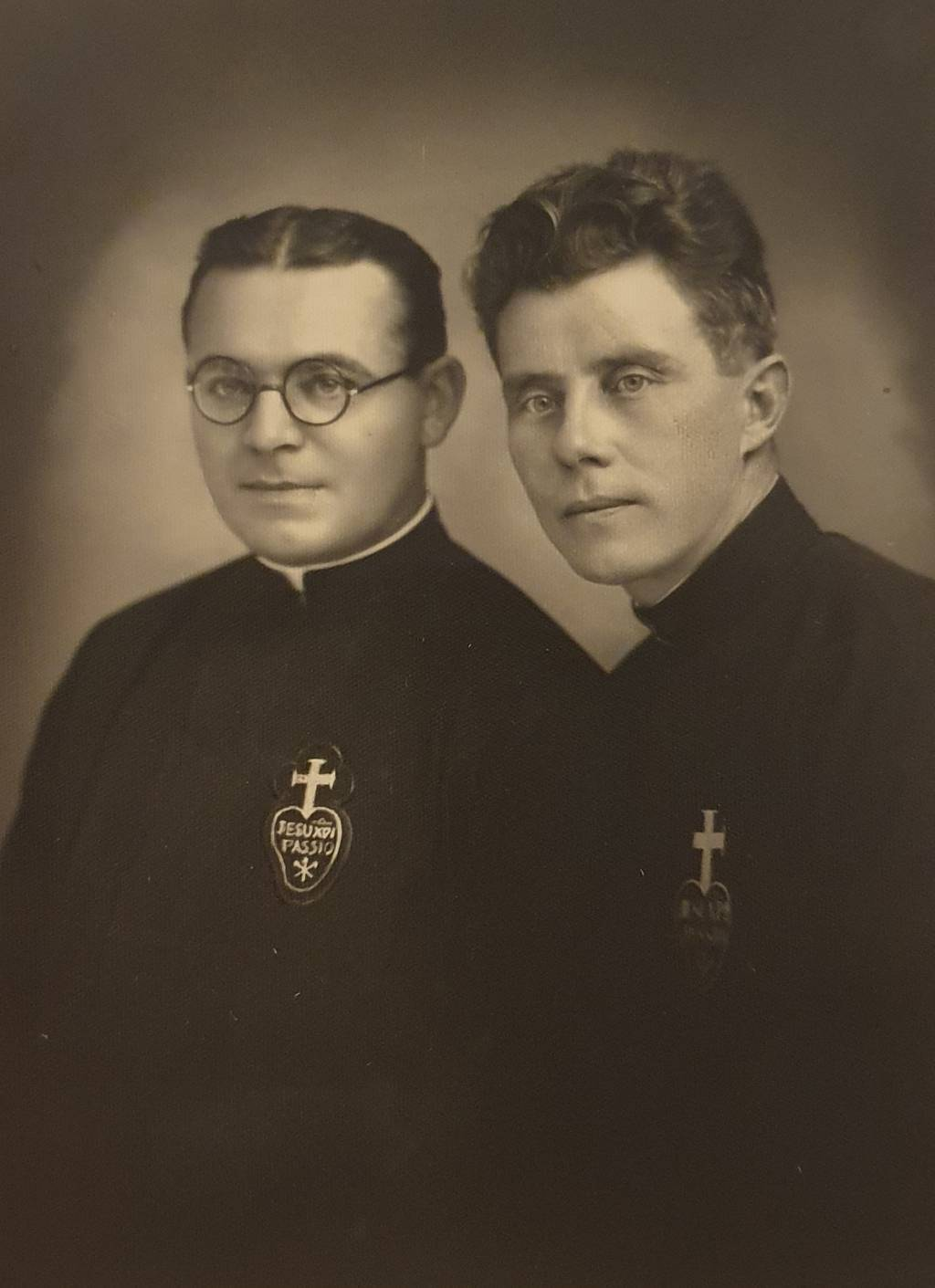
Eugene Bossilkov and Priest Paulus Brouwers

Eugene Bossilkov, CP (born Vincent Bossilkov 16 November 1900 – 11 November 1952) was a Bulgarian Catholic prelate who served as Bishop of Nicopolis from 1947 until his execution by Bulgaria's communist regime in 1952. He was a member of the Passionists.

Bossilkov studied in Rome for his doctorate at the Pontifical Oriental Institute and became a parish priest in the Danube Valley. After becoming a bishop, he was arrested in 1952 by the Communist regime, together with many other religious leaders, and executed for ostensible crimes against the state. He was beatified by Pope John Paul II in 1998.

== Life ==
Vincent Bossilkov was born to a family of Bulgarian Latin Rite Catholics on November 16, 1900, in Belene, Bulgaria. After studies, he entered the Passionist Congregation at the age of 14. The Passionists are an Italian religious institute founded by Saint Paul of the Cross in the eighteenth century. They have practiced in Bulgaria since 1781. Bossilkov studied in Passionist houses in the Netherlands and Belgium and took the religious name Eugene. He professed his vows in 1920 and was ordained to the priesthood in 1926.

He had returned to Bulgaria in 1924 and had pursued theological studies. In 1927 he went to Rome to take his doctorate at the Pontifical Oriental Institute, where he wrote a thesis on the Union of Bulgarians with the Holy See during the early 13th century. On his return to Bulgaria, Bossilkov served in various Diocesan offices, but he preferred working with the laity. He took up a post as parish priest in the Danube River valley. Here his reputation for scholarship grew, and he was noted for his work with the youth of the parish.

In the wake of World War II, the Soviet Union invaded the Kingdom of Bulgaria and installed a Communist government answering to Joseph Stalin. The new regime began to enact laws to destroy religious institutions and beliefs. At this time, Bossilkov was appointed Bishop of Nicopolis in 1947. From 1949 the attitude of the State to religious institutes worsened. In the same year the government deported the Apostolic Delegate, seized Catholic Church property, and suppressed the religious congregations. In 1952 the government began to make mass arrests of church officials. On July 16, police seized Bossilkov in Sophia.

== Martyrdom ==
Bossilkov suffered both physical and mental torture in prison, where he was told to confess to being the leader of a Catholic conspiracy to subvert Communism. At a political "show trial", two guns supposedly seized from the Catholic college in Sophia were presented as evidence. The pistols were part of a museum exhibit. Bossilkov was found guilty and the official sentence against him read;

By virtue of articles 70 and 83 of the penal code, the Court condemns the accused, Eugene Bossilkov, to be sentenced to death by firing squad, and all his goods confiscated... Dr.Eugene Bossilkov, Catholic bishop; completed his religious studies in Italy and was trained by the Vatican for counter-revolutionary activities and espionage. He is one of the directors of a clandestine Catholic organization. He was in touch with diplomats from the imperialist countries and gave them information of a confidential nature. The accused convoked a diocesan council in which it was decided to combat Communism through religious conferences, held in Bulgaria, activities called ' a mission.' No appeal of his sentence is possible.

Bossilkov was executed by firing squad in the grounds of the prison on the night of November 11 at 11:30 pm. Thrown into a mass grave, his body was never recovered. Pope Pius XII had mentioned Bossilkov's being condemned to death in his encyclical letter "Orientales Ecclesias" to the Oriental Churches in 1952. It was not until 1975 that the bishop's death was confirmed; however, when a Bulgarian minister visited the Vatican and was asked directly by Pope Paul VI what happened to the bishop, he answered that Bossilkov had died in prison 23 years before.

== Beatification ==
During the 1980s, supporters gathered evidence regarding Bossilkov's life and death, and put before the Congregation for the Causes of Saints in Rome. At meetings in 1993 and 1994, the Congregation declared it was favourable to the cause of Bossilkov as a Catholic martyr from a theological and juridical perspective. On March 15, 1998, Pope John Paul II declared Bossilkov "Blessed".

In 2010 Eugene Bossilkov was rehabilitated by the Bulgarian National Assembly.
