= Belene Municipality =

Belene Municipality Община Белене
- Municipality
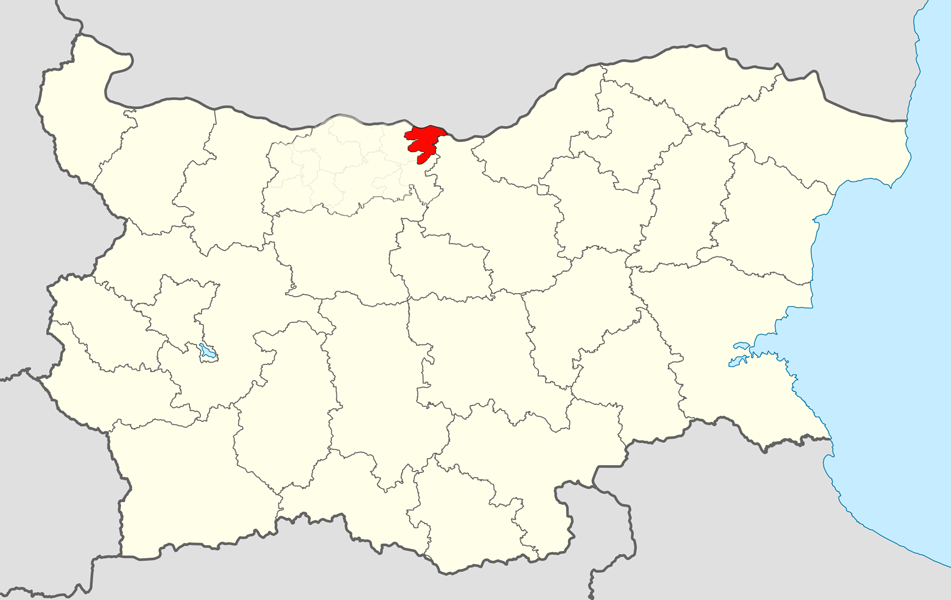
- Belene Municipality within Bulgaria and Pleven Province.
- Coordinates: 43°36′N 25°7′E
- Country: Bulgaria
- Province (Oblast): Pleven
- Admin. centre (Obshtinski tsentar): Belene

Area
  - Total: 285 km^{2} (110 sq mi)

Population (December 2009)
  - Total: 10,908
  - Density: 38.3/km^{2} (99.1/sq mi)
- Time zone: UTC+2 (EET)
  - Summer (DST): UTC+3 (EEST)

Belene Municipality (Bulgarian: Община Белене) is a municipality (obshtina) in Pleven Province, northern Bulgaria. It is located along the south bank of Danube river, by the border with Romania. The administrative centre of the area is the homonymous town of Belene.

The municipality has a territory of 285 km^{2} (110 sq mi) with a population, as of December 2009, of 10,908 inhabitants.

== Settlements ==
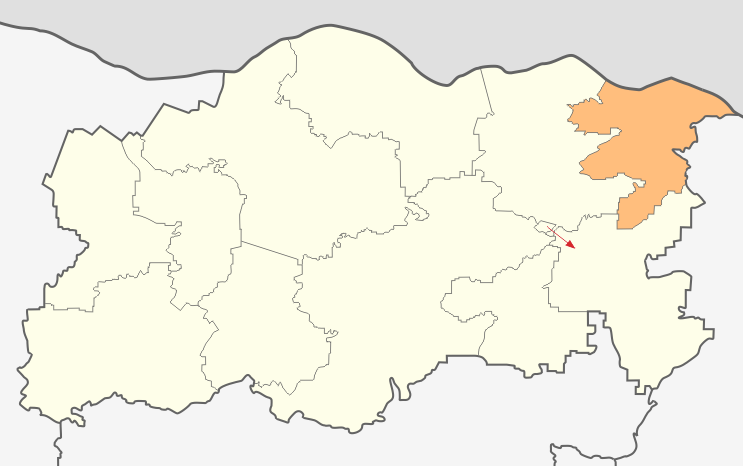
Belene Municipality within Pleven Province

| Town/Village | Cyrillic | Population (December 2009) |
|---|---|---|
| Belene | Белене | 8,905 |
| Byala Voda | Бяла вода | 359 |
| Dekov | Деков | 545 |
| Kulina Voda | Кулина вода | 239 |
| Petokladentsi | Петокладенци | 455 |
| Tatari | Татари | 405 |
| Total | | 10,908 |

== Demography ==
The following table shows the change of the population during the last four decades.

Belene Municipality
| Year | 1975 | 1985 | 1992 | 2001 | 2005 | 2007 | 2009 | 2011 |
| Population | 14,683 | 13,251 | 13,857 | 12,581 | 11,739 | 11,321 | 10,908 | ... |
Sources: Census 2001, Census 2011, „pop-stat.mashke.org“,

=== Religion ===
According to the latest Bulgarian census of 2011, the religious composition, among those who answered the optional question on religious identification, was the following:

Religious composition of Belene Municipality
| Orthodox Christianity | 52.6% |
| Catholicism | 31.9% |
| Protestantism | 0.2% |
| Islam | 1.1% |
| No religion | 6.3% |
| Prefer not to answer, others and indefinable | 7.9% |

Most inhabitants are Christians.

== See also ==
- Provinces of Bulgaria
- Municipalities of Bulgaria
- List of cities and towns in Bulgaria
