= Diocese of Sofia and Plovdiv (Latin Catholic) =

Latin Catholic diocese in Bulgaria

Coordinates: 42°0′N 25°0′E

Diocese of Sofia and Plovdiv Diœcesis Sophiae et Philippopolis Епархия София и Пловдив

Catholic
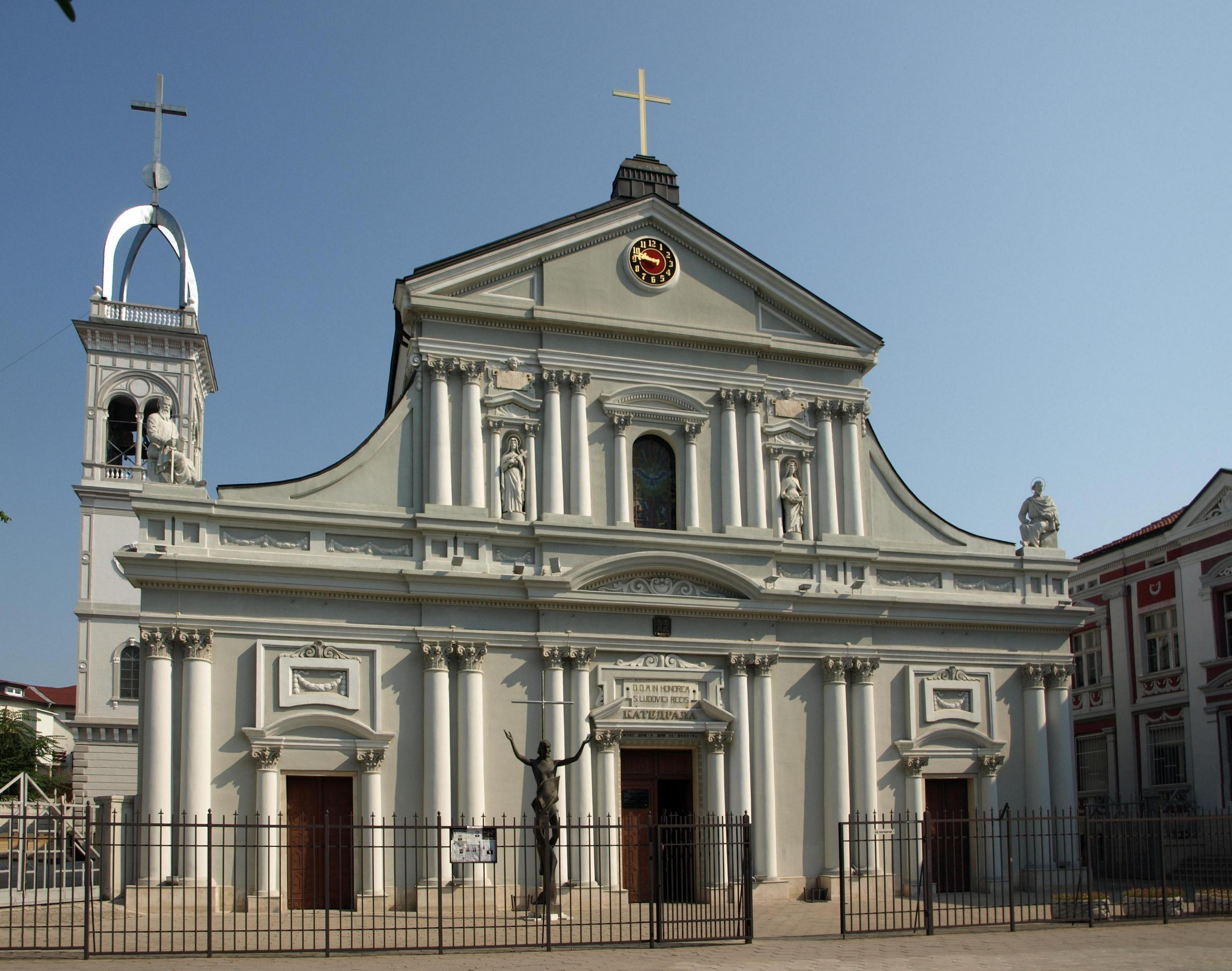
- Cathedral of St Louis, Plovdiv

Location
- Country: Bulgaria
- Metropolitan: Immediately subject to the Holy See

Statistics
- Area: 80,000 km^{2} (31,000 sq mi)
- Population: Total; Catholics: (as of 2014); ▼4,935,000; 33,000 (0.7%)

Information
- Denomination: Catholic
- Sui iuris church: Latin Church
- Rite: Roman Rite
- Established: 1601 (Diocese of Sardica); 1642 (Archdiocese of Sardica); 1759 (Vicariate Apostolic of Sofia and Plovdiv); 3 March 1979 (Diocese of Sofia and Plovdiv)
- Cathedral: Катедрален храм „Свети Лудвиг“; (Cathedral of St. Louis of France), Plovdiv
- Co-cathedral: Катедрален храм „Свети Йосиф“; (Cocathedral of St. Joseph), Sofia

Current leadership
- Pope: Leo XIV
- Bishop: Rumen Stanev
- Bishops emeritus: Georgi Yovchev

Cathedral of St Joseph, Sofia

The Diocese of Sofia and Plovdiv (Latin: Diœcesis Sophiae et Philippopolis) is a Latin diocese of the Catholic Church which includes the whole southern part of Bulgaria. The remainder of Bulgaria falls within the Diocese of Nicopoli. The diocese is exempt, i.e. immediately subject of the Holy See, not part of any ecclesiastical province.

The seat of the episcopal see is the Cathedral of St Louis is in Plovdiv and there is a new co-cathedral in Sofia — the Cathedral of St. Joseph, consecrated on May 21, 2006 by Cardinal Angelo Sodano. The construction was symbolically started by Pope John Paul II during his visit in Sofia in 2002.

== History ==
The former name of the city of Sofia, and the name of the previous diocese was Serdica, the city of the Serdi, a Celtic people defeated by Crassus in 29 BC and subjected to the Kingdom of Thrace, then a vassal state of republican Rome. When this kingdom was suppressed in 49 BC, the Serdi were included in the Roman Province of Thracia. Roman Emperor Trajan transformed the borough of the Serdi into a city which he called Ulpia Serdica. In 275 Aurelian caused Dacia beyond the Danube to be evacuated, and transplanted to Moesia and Roman Thracia the soldiers and colonists who were faithful to the Roman cause. The country occupied by these immigrants formed the new Province of Dacia, Sardica being included in this province (Homo, "Essai sur le règne de l'empereur Aurélien", pp. 313–21).

Later, Diocletian divided Dacia into Dacia Ripensis and Dacia Mediterranea. Sardica was the civil and ecclesiastical metropolis of the latter. Gallienus established a mint at Sardica, and Constantine the Great, who was born in the region, contemplated making it his capital. The Edict of Serdica ending the Diocletian persecution was signed into law here.

Ecclesiastically, Sardica belonged to the Patriarchate of Rome until 733, when it was annexed to the Patriarchate of Constantinople until 809. Upon the conversion of the Bulgarians to Christianity in 865, Sardica was one of the first cities which had an episcopal see. Until 1204 it was included in the Graeco-Bulgarian Patriarchate of Achrida, until 1393 in the Bulgarian Patriarchate of Tirnovo and until 1872 again in the Ecumenical Patriarchate of Constantinople. Since then Sardica, which is now called Sophia, belongs to the Orthodox national Church of Bulgaria.

The earliest known bishop is Protagenes, who assisted at the First Council of Nicaea in 325; the best known is Bonosus, who shortly afterwards attacked the virginity of the Blessed Virgin.

Julian of Sardica who was metropolitan of Dacia Meditteranea attended the Council of Ephesus, in 431.

When it was captured by the Bulgars, they changed its name to Sredetz, later transformed by the Greeks into Sraditza and Triaditza. Again occupied by the 'Greek' Byzantines from 1018 to 1186, it enjoyed great prosperity; a section of the population was Paulician or Manichaean, heresies from both Catholic and (later) Orthodox points of view. After some years of troubles it again fell into the power of the Bulgars. Its present name of Sophia dates from the Middle Ages, though the precise date of its first use cannot be assigned; in the sixteenth century Sredetz and Sophia were used simultaneously. In 1382 the city was captured by the Ottoman Turks, and for more than four centuries it was the residence of the beglerbeg (governor general) of all Rumelia. In 1878 Sophia was chosen as the capital of the tributary Principality of Bulgaria, and since 1908 became the capital of the Kingdom of Bulgaria, later of the present republic.

== Ancient Bishopric ==
Melitone (2nd century) Giuliano (4th century) Protogene (316 - 343) Apollinare (fl380 ) Giuliano(424 - 431) Zosimo (fl 458) Domnus (fl 516) Basil (553 - circa. 550) Teupreprio † (6th century) Felice (fl 594) Eutimio(9th or 10th century)

== Council of Sardica ==
The Council of Sardica was summoned as an Ecumenical Council in 342, 343, or 347 in response to the Arian Heresy. Emperors Constans and Constantius, the two remaining sons of Constantine worked together at the urging of Pope Julius in response to this heresy that not only divided the church, but the state as well. Constans, Augustus in Rome, favored the Nicene bishops while Constantius, Augustus in Constantinople, often supported Arian ones. To help insure equal representation to solve this divisive issue, Sardica (now Sofia in Bulgaria) was chosen as a location near the division between eastern and western portions of the Roman State. However, fearing domination of the council by Western bishops, many Eastern bishops left the council to hold another council in Philippopolis. As a result, the Council of Sardica failed to universally represent the church and is not one of the official Ecumenical Councils.

Sardica produced 21 canon. In addition to the attempt to resolve the Arian issue, other major points were:

1. Bishops should not attempt to recruit from diocese other than their own
2. Bishops should be permanent residents of their own diocese
3. Bishops should spend most of their time in their own diocese (not at the court in Rome)
4. Bishops should not be transferred to another diocese

== Modern Catholic jurisdiction in Sofia ==
An Apostolic vicariate (missionary pre-diocesan jurisdiction, entitled to a titular bishop) was created here at an early date and confided to the Franciscans.

In 1610 Rome reestablished – but now as a suffragan bishopric – the episcopal see of Sophia, which in 1643 was made archiepiscopal again.

It was suppressed towards the end of the eighteenth century, because the Catholics felt persecuted by the Turks and had emigrated, mostly to imperial Austria-Hungary and Russia, yet in 1758 restored, now as Apostolic Vicariate of Sofia–Plovdiv . Relative peace was restored in 1835, and Rome confided the direction of the Catholics to the Redemptorists, under a vicar Apostolic who had not received episcopal consecration. The Redemptorists were replaced by the Capuchins in 1841, their superior being consecrated bishop in 1848.

In the early 20th century a titular bishop (of various other sees) was the head of this vicariate Apostolic. Sophia had 105,000 inhabitants, of whom a small number are Catholics. The Christian Brothers had a school there, and the Sisters of St. Joseph of the Apparition three convents.

== Leadership ==
Metropolitan Archbishops of Sofia

- Petrus Deodatus, Friars Minor (O.F.M.) (1642 – death 1672), Titular Bishop of Callipolis (1638.02.13 – 1642), succeeding as former Coadjutor Bishop of Sofia (Bulgaria) (1638.02.13 – 1642)
- Pavao Joščić (? – 1719.07)
- Marko Andrijašević (1723.11.20 – ?)
- Gjergj Radovani (1767–1771)
- Paolo Dovanli (1771–1776)

Apostolic Vicars of Sofia–Plovdiv

- Giovanni Nepomuceno, C.SS.R. (?–?)
- Andrea Canova (1851–1856)
- Francesco Domenico Raynaud (Reynaudi), O.F.M. Cap. (12 Dec 1867 Appointed – 1885 Resigned), Titular Bishop of Ægeæ (1867.12.12 – 1885.05.05), Titular Archbishop of Stauropolis (1885.05.05 – death 1893.07.24)
- Roberto Menini, O.F.M. Cap. (19 May 1885 Appointed – 14 October 1916 Died), succeeding as former Coadjutor Vicar Apostolic of Sofia–Plovdiv (1880.01.30 – 1885.05.05) and Titular Bishop of Metellopolis (1880.01.30 – 1885.05.19), emeritus as Titular Archbishop of Gangra (1885.05.19 – 1916.10.14)
- Vinkenti Peev (Cleto Vincenzo Pejov), O.F.M. Cap. (14 October 1916 Succeeded – 1941 Died), succeeding as former Coadjutor Vicar Apostolic of Sofia–Plovdiv (1912.12.13 – 1916.10.14) & Titular Bishop of Lyrbe (1912.12.13 – 1941.11.03)
- Ivan Romanov (6 July 1942 Appointed – 1959 Died), Titular Bishop of Prizren (Kosovo) (1942.07.06 – 1959)
  - Apostolic Administrator Simeon Kokov (Kokoff), O.F.M. (1958.04.20 – 1974.07.11)
- Bogdan Stefanov Dobranov (22 July 1975 Appointed – 1978.12.14), Titular Bishop of Giufi (1959.10.10 – 1978.12.14)

Suffragan Bishops of Sofia–Plovdiv

- Bogdan Stefanov Dobranov (1978.12.14 – 4 October 1983 Died)
  - Apostolic Administrator 1988.07.06 – 1995.11.13) Georgi Yovchev, Titular Bishop of Lamphua (1988.07.06 – 1995.11.13)
- Georgi Yovchev (13 November 1995 Appointed – 16 July 2025)
- Rumen Stanev (7 January 2026 – present)

== Titular see of Philippopolis ==
The position of a Titular Bishop of Philippopolis (in Thracia) (i.e. Plovdiv) existed since 1893 and 1967

It was originally just called Philippopolis, until 'in Thracia' was added (distinguishing it from several homonymous sees) in 1926 (in curiate Italian; also in Latin in 1933).

It is vacant for decades, having been occupied by the following individuals:

- Giovanni Giorgio Topich, O.F.M. (10 Jul 1859 – 11 Jun 1868)
- Félix-Clair Ridel, M.E.P. (27 Apr 1869 – 20 Jun 1884)
- José Tomás Mazarrasa y Rivas (21 Feb 1885 – 11 Mar 1907 )
- Macario Sorini: 1893–1895
- François Lesné: 1896–1910
- Bonaventura Cerretti: 1914–1914, later Cardinal
- Wincenty Kluczynski: 1914–1917
- Ernesto Cozzi: 1920–1926
- Jean-Pierre Rey: 1926–1930
- Carlo Salotti: 1930–1935, later Cardinal
- Ivan Rafael Rodić: 1936–1954
- Franjo Šeper: 1954–1960, later Cardinal
- Emile-Arsène Blanchet: 1960–1967

== Sources and external links ==
- Herbermann, Charles, ed. (1913). "Sardica" . Catholic Encyclopedia. New York: Robert Appleton Company.
- GigaCatholic Sofia-Plovid
- GigaCatholic Titular Metropolitan Philippopolis in Thracia
- Council of Sardica
- Arms of the Cross site (Unification of Catholic and Orthodox)
- English translations of the Greek and Latin versions of the canon
- Canon and documentation as to when the council was actually held
