= Pamphylian =

Pamphylian may refer to:

- Pamphylia, on the southern coast of Anatolia
- Pamphylian Greek
- Anatolian languages of Pamphylia:
  - Pisidian language
  - Sidetic language
