= Georgi Yovchev =

Bulgarian Roman Catholic bishop (born 1950)

The Most Reverend Georgi Ivanov Yovchev
- Bishop emeritus of Sofia-Plovdiv
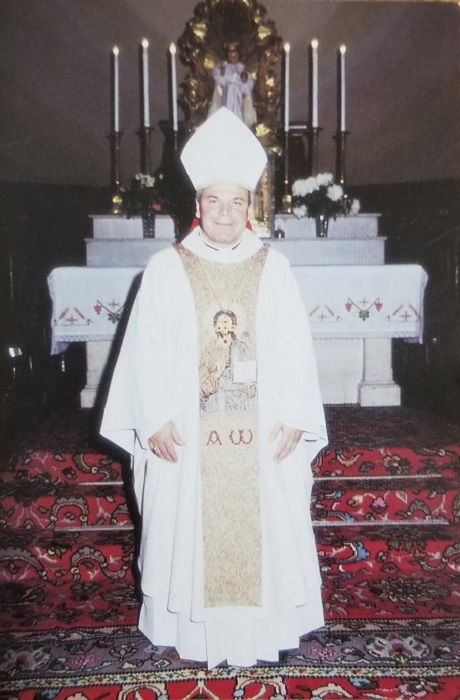
- Native name: Георги Иванов Йовчев
- Church: Roman Catholic Church
- Diocese: Sofia-Plovdiv
- See: Sofia-Plovdiv
- Appointed: 13 November 1995
- Retired: 16 July 2025
- Predecessor: Bogdan Stefanov Dobranov
- Previous posts: Titular Bishop of Lamphua (1988–1995); Apostolic Administrator of Sofia-Plovdiv (1988–1995)

Orders
- Ordination: 9 May 1976 by Bogdan Stefanov Dobranov
- Consecration: 31 July 1988 by Francesco Colasuonno

Personal details
- Born: Georgi Ivanov Yovchev; 6 May 1950 (age 76) Sekirovo, Rakovski, Bulgaria
- Education: Pontifical Oriental Institute
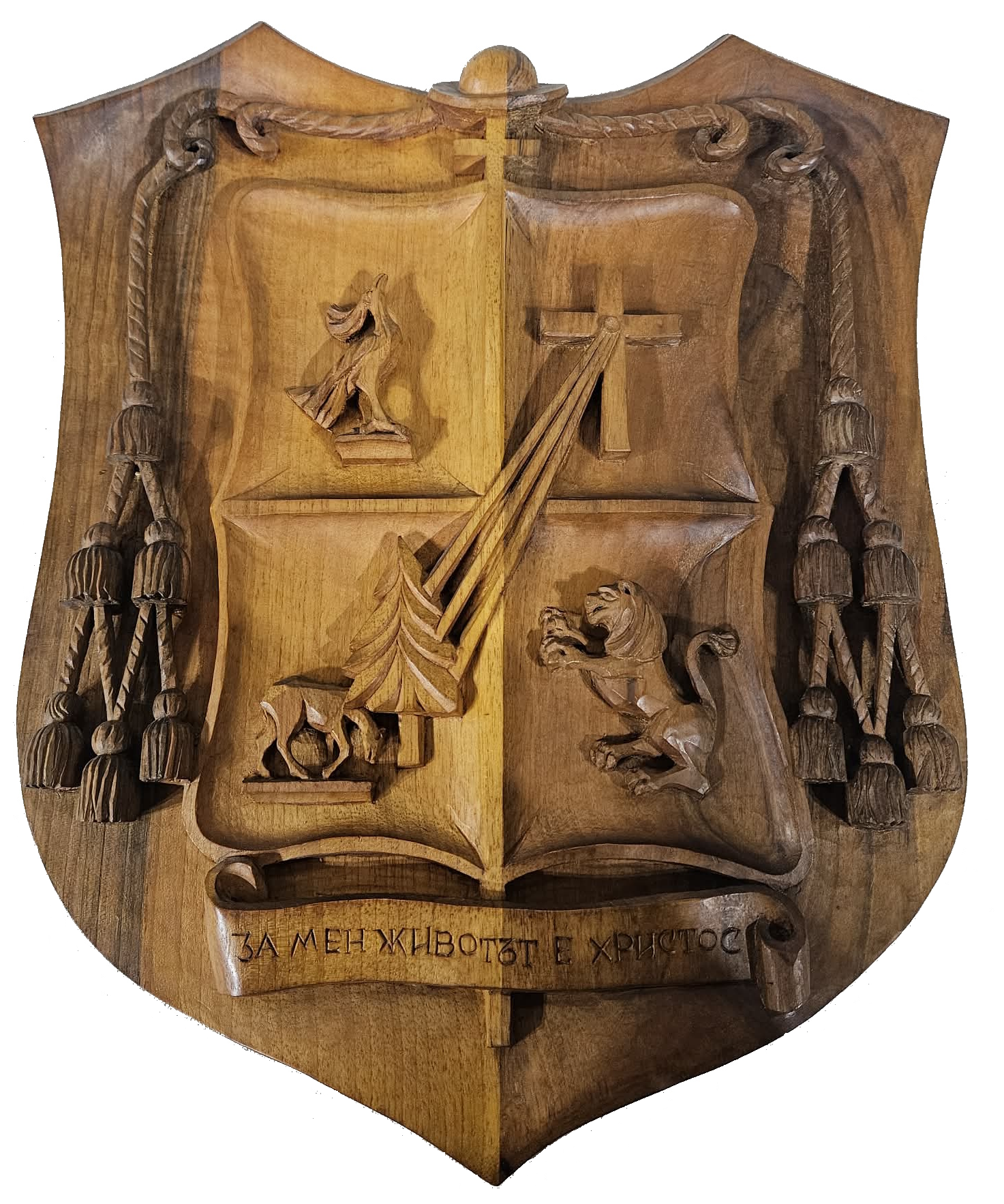
- Coat of arms

Georgi Ivanov Yovchev (Bulgarian: Георги Иванов Йовчев; born 6 May 1950) is a Bulgarian Roman Catholic prelate, who served as a bishop of the Diocese of Sofia and Plovdiv from 1995 until his retirement in 2025.

== Early life and education ==
Georgi Ivanov Yovchev was born in Sekirovo, a part of the town of Rakovski, Bulgaria and was educated at Professional School of Agriculture in Belozem where he studied internal combustion engines. His military service was in Sofia. Because of the Communist regime, he secretly prepared for the priesthood, being parish priest in Plovdiv, Rakovski, Kaloyanovo, Duvanlii and Zhitnitsa.

== Religious career ==
On 9 May 1976, Yovchev was ordained Catholic priest by Bishop Bogdan Dobranov. He studied theology at the Pontifical Oriental Institute in Rome, Italy.

On 6 July 1988, Jovcev became Apostolic Administrator of the Diocese of Sofia and Plovdiv and Titular Bishop of Lamphua. On 31 July 1988, he was consecrated bishop by Archbishop Francesco Colasuonno, Bishop Samuel Dzhundrin, AA and Exarch Metodi Stratiev, AA at Cathedral of St Louis, Plovdiv.

On 13 November 1995, he was appointed bishop of the Roman Catholic Diocese of Sofia and Plovdiv. Yovchev is a member of the Episcopal Conference of Bulgaria. In the Episcopal Conference of Bulgaria he was the chairman of various committees, including Congregation for Divine Worship and the Discipline of the Sacraments, Pontifical Council for Justice and Peace, Tip for Families, Council for Secular Parties and Council Catechism.

In the spring of 2025, in connection with his 75th anniversary, Bishop Yovchev submitted his resignation as diocesan bishop. On 16 July of the same year, the Pope accepted his resignation and on the same day a thanksgiving liturgy was celebrated in the Cathedral of St. Ludwig in Plovdiv, attended by Bishops Petko Valov, Strahil Kavalenov, Rumen Stanev and Christo Proykov, as well as priests from the diocese.

== Awards ==
Yovchev was awarded with the Grand Cross of the Order pro merito Melitensi, from the Order of Malta, on 19 June 2009 in the city of Rakovski, Bulgaria.

== Collaboration with Communist regime's secret service ==
In 2012, Bishop Yovchev was charged that in 1987 he was recruited by the Bulgarian secret service. He called all these accusations as slander.
