= Rumen Stanev =

Bulgarian Roman Catholic bishop (born 1973)

His Excellency, The Most Reverend Rumen Stanev
- Bishop of Sofia and Plovdiv
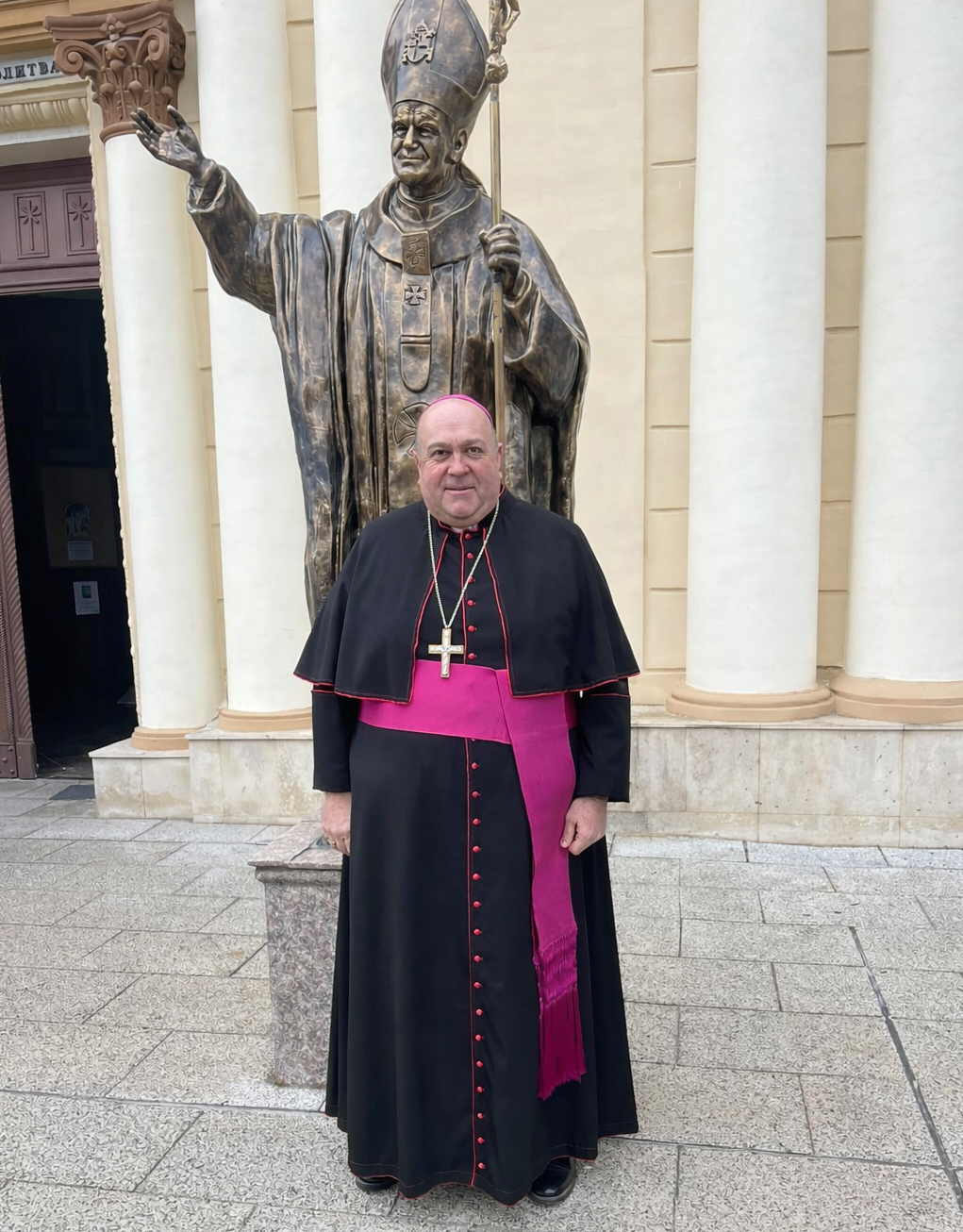
- Native name: Румен Станев
- Church: Catholic Church
- Diocese: Roman Catholic Diocese of Sofia and Plovdiv
- Appointed: 7 January 2026
- Predecessor: Georgi Yovchev
- Other post: Apostolic administrator of Diocese of Nicopolis (2026–present)
- Previous posts: Auxiliary Bishop of Sofia and Plovdiv (2020–2026); Titular bishop of Simidicca (2020–2026); Diocesan administrator of Sofia and Plovdiv (2025–2026)

Orders
- Ordination: 11 September 1999 by Georgi Yovchev
- Consecration: 17 January 2021 by Georgi Yovchev, Christo Proykov and Kiro Stojanov

Personal details
- Born: Rumen Ivanov Stanev; 19 August 1973 (age 53) Kaloyanovo, Plovdiv Province, Bulgaria
- Education: Pontifical Urban University
- Motto: Gaudete in Domino semper
- Coat of arms

Rumen Ivanov Stanev (Bulgarian: Румен Иванов Станев; born 19 August 1973) is a Bulgarian Roman Catholic prelate serving as Bishop of Sofia and Plovdiv since 2026. He previously served as auxiliary bishop of the diocese from 2020 until 2026 and has served as apostolic administrator of the Diocese of Nicopolis since April 2026.

== Early life and education ==
Stanev was born on 19 August 1973 in Kaloyanovo, Plovdiv Province, Bulgaria. After completing his secondary education, he entered the seminary of the Roman Catholic Diocese of Sofia and Plovdiv. He continued his ecclesiastical studies at the Pontifical Urban University in Rome, where he studied philosophy and theology and earned a bachelor's degree in theology.

== Priestly ministry ==
Stanev was ordained to the priesthood on 11 September 1999 by Bishop Georgi Yovchev for the Roman Catholic Diocese of Sofia and Plovdiv.

Following his ordination, he served as parochial vicar in the parish of the Blessed Virgin Mary in General Nikolaevo-Rakovski. In 2005 he became parish priest of the Sacred Heart of Jesus parish in the Sekirovo district of Rakovski.

In addition to parish ministry, he served as diocesan director and president of Caritas Sofia–Plovdiv. He subsequently became president of Caritas Bulgaria, coordinating the activities of the national Catholic charitable organisation.

He also served as a member of the diocesan presbyteral council, the college of consultors, and several diocesan commissions.

== Episcopal ministry ==
On 5 September 2020, Pope Francis appointed Stanev an auxiliary bishop of the Roman Catholic Diocese of Sofia and Plovdiv and titular bishop of Simidicca.

He received episcopal consecration on 17 January 2021 from Bishop Georgi Yovchev, with Bishop Christo Proykov and Bishop Kiro Stojanov serving as co-consecrators.

Following the retirement of Bishop Georgi Yovchev in July 2025, Stanev was elected diocesan administrator of the Roman Catholic Diocese of Sofia and Plovdiv, governing the diocese during the sede vacante period until the appointment of a new diocesan bishop.

On 7 January 2026, Pope Leo XIV appointed Stanev Bishop of the Roman Catholic Diocese of Sofia and Plovdiv. He took canonical possession of the diocese on 7 February 2026 during a solemn Mass at the Cathedral of St. Louis in Plovdiv.

On 9 April 2026, Pope Leo XIV appointed Stanev apostolic administrator sede vacante et ad nutum Sanctae Sedis of the Diocese of Nicopolis.
