= Bogdan Stefanov Dobranov =

- Bishop of Sofia and Plovdiv
- Native name: Богдан Стефанов Добранов
- Church: Catholic Church
- Diocese: Diocese of Sofia and Plovdiv
- In office: 22 July 1975 – 4 October 1983
- Predecessor: Ivan Romanov
- Successor: Gheorghi Ivanov Jovcev
- Previous posts: Titular Bishop of Giufi (1959-1978); Apostolic Administrator of Sofia and Plovdiv (1954-1965)

Orders
- Ordination: 23 March 1940
- Consecration: 8 November 1959 by Kiril Kurtev

Personal details
- Born: 1 December 1914 Plovdiv, Plovdiv Okrug, Kingdom of Bulgaria
- Died: 4 October 1983 (aged 68) Plovdiv, Plovdiv District, People's Republic of Bulgaria
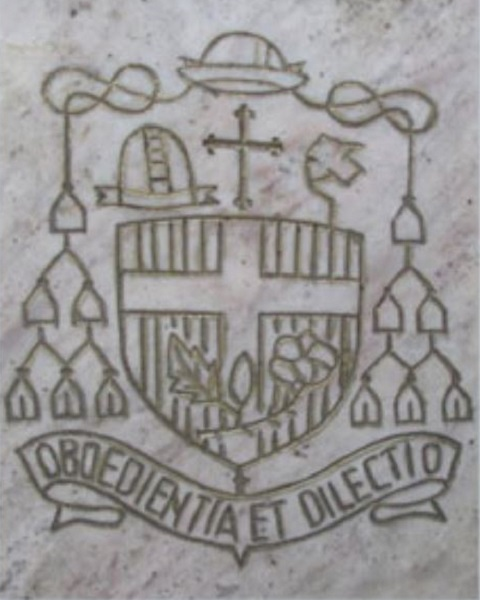
- Coat of arms

Bogdan Dobranov (Bulgarian: Богдан Добранов) (1 December 1914, Plovdiv – 4 October 1983, Plovdiv) was a Bulgarian Catholic priest and bishop Ordinariate of the Roman Catholic Diocese of Sofia and Plovdiv.

== Biography ==
Bogdan Dobranov was born in Plovdiv. On 23 March 1940, he was ordained a priest, and on 10 October 1959, he was elected titular bishop of Gyufi. He was consecrated bishop on 8 November 1959. On 22 July 1975, he was appointed as the apostolic vicar of Sofia and Plovdiv, and on 14 December 1978 he was appointed as the Bishop of Sofia and Plovdiv. After his death, the Sofia and Plovdiv diocese remained without a bishop for nearly five years, because of the difficult political situation.
