= Sidetic language =

Ancient Indo-European language

Sidetic
- Region: Ancient southwestern Anatolia
- Extinct: after the third century BCE
- Language family: Indo-European: Anatolian; Luwo-Lydian; Luwo-Palaic; Luwic; Lyco-Carian; Lycian–Sidetic; Sidetic
- Early forms: Proto-Indo-European: Proto-Anatolian
- Writing system: Sidetic script

Language codes
- ISO 639-3: xsd
- Glottolog: side1240
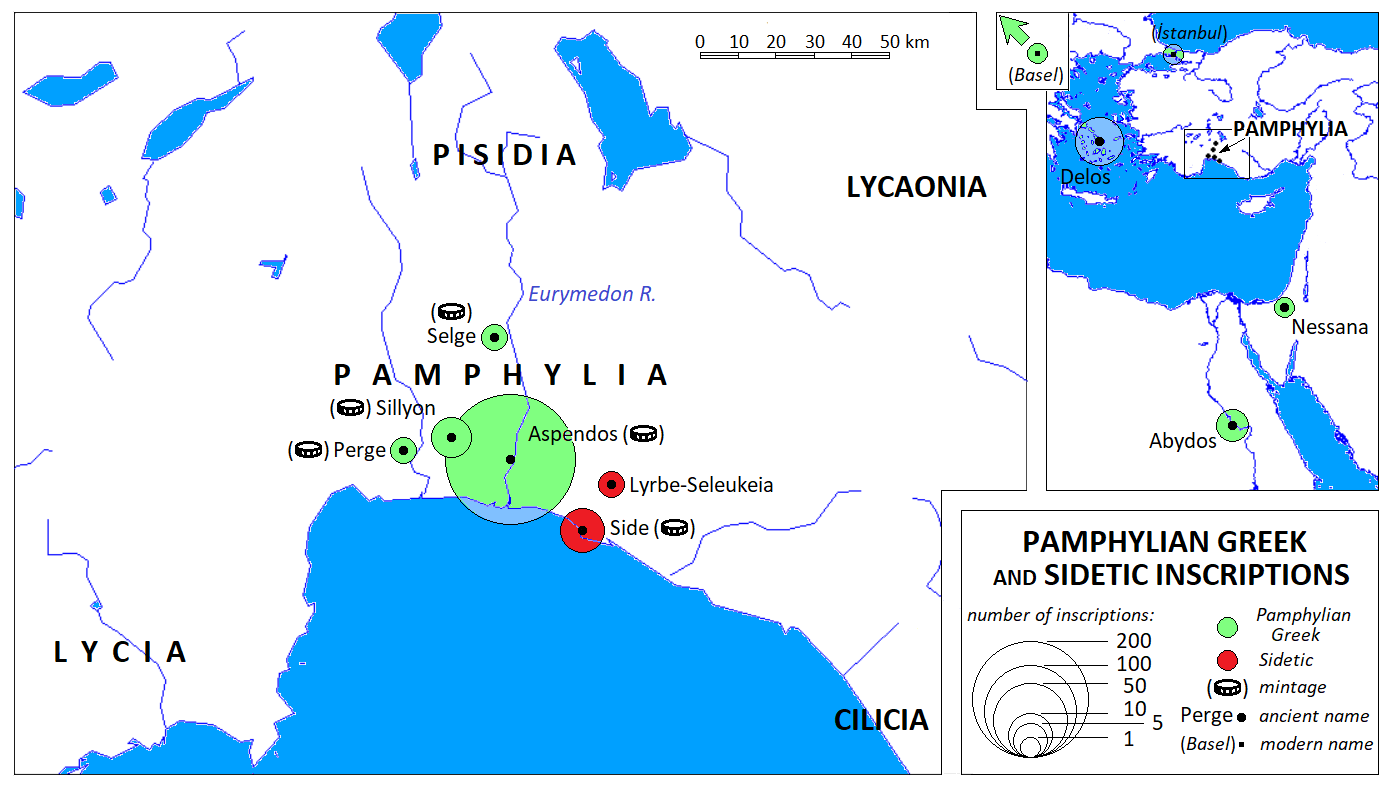
- Map showing (in red) where Sidetic inscriptions have been found.

Sidetic is a member of the extinct Anatolian branch of the Indo-European language family. It is known from legends of coins, found in Side at the Pamphylian coast, that date to the period of approximately the 5th to 3rd centuries BCE, and from two Greek–Sidetic bilingual inscriptions from the 3rd and 2nd centuries BCE. The Greek historian Arrian in his Anabasis Alexandri (mid-2nd century CE) mentions the existence of a peculiar indigenous language in the city of Side, which is assumed to be the language of the coins and inscriptions. Sidetic was probably closely related to Lydian, Carian and Lycian.

Sidetic was written with a script of the Anatolian group. The Sidetic alphabet has 31 identified letters, a few of which are clearly derived from Greek. The script has been partially deciphered, though the phonetic values of many letters are uncertain.

== Evidence ==
=== Inscriptions and coins ===
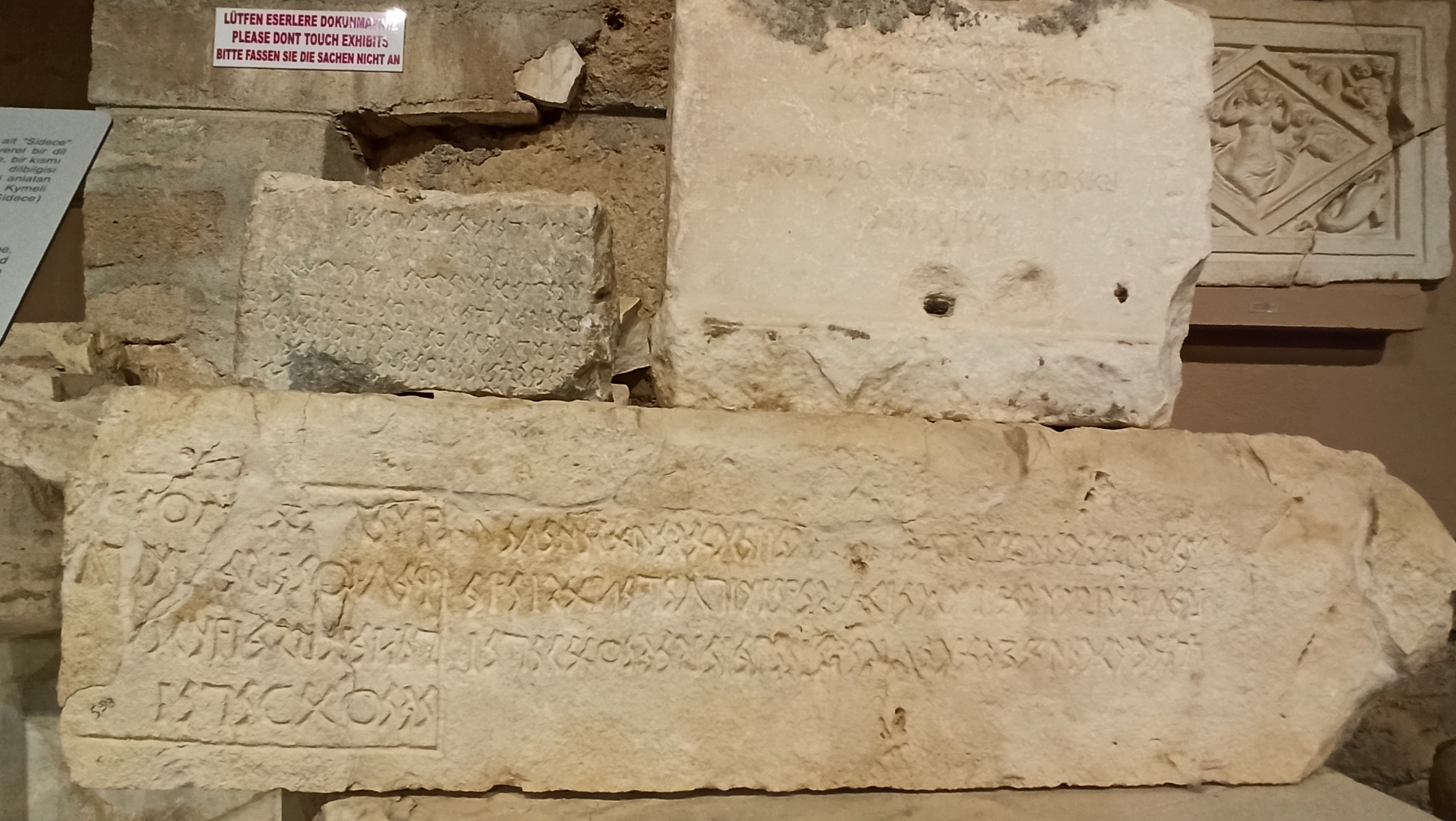
Inscriptions in Sidetic language, exhibits of the Museum of Side, Turkey. Clockwise from upper left S9, S1, S3, and S4

Coins from Side were first discovered in the 19th century, which bore legends in a then-unknown script. In 1914, an altar came to light in Side with a Greek inscription and a Sidetic one, but the latter could not be deciphered. It was only after the discovery of a second Greek-Sidetic bilingual inscription in 1949, that Hellmut Theodor Bossert was able to identify 14 letters of the Sidetic script using the two bilinguals. In 1964 a large stone block was unearthed near the east gate of Side, with two longer Sidetic texts, including loan words from Greek (istratag from στρατηγός, 'commander' and anathema- from ἀνάθημα, 'votive offering'). In 1972, a text was found outside Side for the first time, at the neighbouring town of Lyrbe-Seleukia. Currently, eleven Sidetic coins and several coins with Sidetic legends are known.

=== Citations ===
In addition to the inscriptions, two Sidetic words are known from ancient Greek texts: ζειγάρη for cicada, mentioned by the ancient lexicographer Hesychius, and λαέρκινον for Valeriana, cited by Galen. In addition, it is believed that some incomprehensible characters in the third book of Hippocrates' Epidemics were originally quotations of the doctor Mnemon of Side, which might have been in the Sidetic script.

=== Catalogue of Sidetic texts ===
The designated number and date of discovery are given:

- S1 = S I.1.1 Artemon bilingual from Side (1914).
- S2 = S I.1.2 Apollonios bilingual from Side (1949).
- S3 & S4 = S I.2.1-2 Strategos dedications from Side (1964).
- S5 = S II.1.1 Palimpsest bronze voting tablet (1969).
- S6 = S I.1.3 Euempolos bilingual from Lyrbe-Seleukia (1972).
- S7 = S I.2.3 Inscription on fragment of the rim of a pot (1982).
- S8 = S I.2.4 Inscription on stone Heraldes relief (1982).
- S9 = S I.2.5 A list of names, also interpreted as the "Athenodoros memorial" - at six complete lines (and traces of two more lines), this is the longest Sidetic inscription (1995).
- S10 = S III 5th century BC coins with around twenty different legends (since 19th century).
- S11 Words possibly from Mnemon, a physician of Side (1983), who added notes in Sidetic to a Greek Hippocrates manuscript.
- S12 = S II.2.1 A steatite scarab, of uncertain provenance ("acquired in Turkey"); on its underside three (?) hardly identifiable signs have been carved, possibly Sidetic (2005).
- S13 = S I.2.6 Graffito from Lyrbe-Seleukia (2014).

In addition a few Sidetic words have been handed down via classical authors, though not written in Sidetic script: "laerkinon" (λαέρκινον, = the herb valerian), "zeigarê" (ζειγάρη, a cricket, cicada).

== Characteristics of Sidetic ==
=== Sidetic script ===
Sidetic
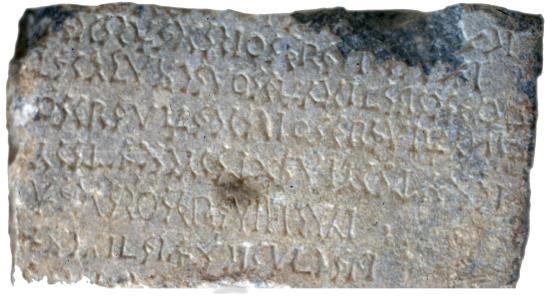
- Script type: alphabet
- Direction: Right to left
- Languages: Sidetic

ISO 15924
- ISO 15924: Sidt (180), Sidetic

Unicode
- Unicode alias: Sidetic
- Unicode range: U+10940–U+1095F

Texts in the Sidetic language are written right to left in an alphabet of 31 distinct letters in inscriptions, plus another 4 characters found only on coins. Recent research is providing updates to the script: there are new letters and variants

Nollé number	N01	N02	N03	N04	N05	N06	N07	N08	N09	N10	N11	N12	N13	N14	N15	N16	N17	N18
glyph																		
(variants:)						(?)												
Graz-Verona transliteration	a	e	i	o	u	w	y	p	d_{2}	m	t	d	θ	s	s_{2}	n	l	𐌣
(superseded transliterations:)						(v, j)	(j, w)		(τ, ç, φ)					(z, ś)	(s)			(š, ṯ)
notes					vowel or semivowel									no consensus transliteration				value uncertain; likely /ts/ or /ʃ/

Nolle number	N19	N20	N21	N22	N23	N24	N25	N26
glyph								
(variants:)							(?)	
transliteration	g	χ	r	V	k	b	n_{2}	z (?)
(superseded transliterations:)						(ñ)	(c, ñ)	(δ)
notes				unknown vowel		perhaps [β]		probably [z]

Extended repertoire	
glyph	Ω
(variants:)	
transliteration	
(superseded transliterations:)	
notes	letters attested only from coins

The values of two-thirds of the letters are now firmly established, but there are still significant uncertainties: for example, while the majority view is that the frequent vertical strokes ( or) are a character denoting a sibilant (z or s), that as a genitival ending would fit in nicely with the usual paradigms of the Anatolian languages, others interpret the strokes as word dividers.

=== Grammar ===
The inscriptions show that Sidetic was already strongly influenced by Greek at the time when they were written. Like Lycian and Carian, it was part of the Luwian language family. However, only a few words can be derived from Luwian roots, like maśara 'for the gods' (Luwian masan(i)-, 'god', 'divinity'), and, possibly, malwadas 'votive offering' (Luwian malwa-; but alternative readings are possible, for example, Malya das, 'he dedicated to Malya [= Athena]'). It has been argued that there were also Anatolian pronouns (ev, 'this'; ab, 'he/she/it'), conjunctions (ak and za, 'and'), prepositions (de, 'for'), and adverbs (osod, 'there').

The declension of nouns basically follows a familiar Anatolian language pattern:

	Singular		Plural	
	animate	inanimate	animate	inanimate
Nominative	-Ø		-s (-z/ś)	
Accusative	-o (?)		-s (-z/ś)	
Genitive	-s (-z/ś)		-e	
Dative / Locative	-i, -a (-o?)		-a	
Ablative	-d (?)			

No verbs have yet been securely identified. A promising candidate is ozad, 'he offered', dedicated' (twice attested with object anathemataz, 'sacrifices'), a 3rd person singular preterite with the common Anatolian ending -d.

Like the neighbouring Pamphylian language, aphaeresis is frequent in names in Sidetic (e.g. Poloniw for Apollonios, Thandor for Athenodoros), as is syncope (e.g. Artmon for Artemon).

== Unicode ==
The Sidetic alphabet was added to the Unicode Standard in September 2025 with the release of version 17.0.

The Unicode block for Sidetic is U+10940–U+1095F:

Sidetic^{[1]}^{[2]} Official Unicode Consortium code chart (PDF)
	0	1	2	3	4	5	6	7	8	9	A	B	C	D	E	F
U+1094x	𐥀	𐥁	𐥂	𐥃	𐥄	𐥅	𐥆	𐥇	𐥈	𐥉	𐥊	𐥋	𐥌	𐥍	𐥎	𐥏
U+1095x	𐥐	𐥑	𐥒	𐥓	𐥔	𐥕	𐥖	𐥗	𐥘	𐥙						
Notes 1.As of Unicode version 18.0 2.Grey areas indicate non-assigned code points

== See also ==
- Pisidian language
