= Vinkenti Peev =

Bulgarian Catholic priest (1873–1941)

His Excellency Vinkenti Peev
- Vicar Apostolic of Sofia and Plovdiv
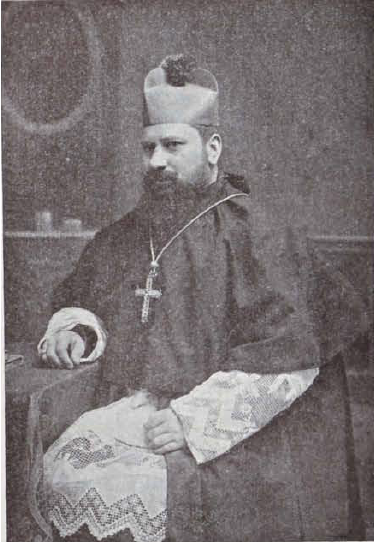
- Archdiocese: Roman Catholic Diocese of Sofia and Plovdiv
- See: Roman Catholic Diocese of Sofia and Plovdiv
- Appointed: 14 October 1916
- Installed: 14 October 1916
- Predecessor: Archbishop Roberto Menini

Orders
- Ordination: 1897

Personal details
- Born: 11 November 1873 Rakovski, Bulgaria
- Died: March 2, 1941 (aged 67) Sofia, Bulgaria

Styles of Vinkenti Peev
- Reference style: The Most Reverend
- Spoken style: Your Excellency
- Religious style: Monsignor
- Posthumous style: Bishop

Vinkenti Peev (Bulgarian: Винкенти Пеев) was a Bulgarian Catholic priest, Capuchin friar and Vicar Apostolic of Sofia and Plovdiv.

== Life ==
Peev was born on 11 November 1873 in the Bulgarian town of Baltadzhii (today Rakovski). In 1897 he was ordained as a priest. On 13 December 1912 he was appointed Coadjutor Vicar Apostolic of Sofia and Plovdiv and Titular Bishop of Lyrbe. On 3 February 1913 he was consecrated a bishop. He succeeded Archbishop Roberto Menini on 14 October 1916 as Vicar Apostolic of Sofia and Plovdiv.

Bishop Peev died on 2 March 1941 in Sofia.
