= Sidetic (Unicode block) =

- Range: U+10940..U+1095F (32 code points)
- Plane: SMP
- Scripts: Sidetic
- Assigned: 26 code points
- Unused: 6 reserved code points

Unicode version history
- 17.0 (2025): 26 (+26)

Unicode documentation
- Code chart ∣ Web page

Sidetic is a Unicode block containing letters for the extinct Sidetic language from Side, Turkey.

== Block ==
Sidetic^{[1]}^{[2]} Official Unicode Consortium code chart (PDF)
| | 0 | 1 | 2 | 3 | 4 | 5 | 6 | 7 | 8 | 9 | A | B | C | D | E | F |
| U+1094x | 𐥀 | 𐥁 | 𐥂 | 𐥃 | 𐥄 | 𐥅 | 𐥆 | 𐥇 | 𐥈 | 𐥉 | 𐥊 | 𐥋 | 𐥌 | 𐥍 | 𐥎 | 𐥏 |
| U+1095x | 𐥐 | 𐥑 | 𐥒 | 𐥓 | 𐥔 | 𐥕 | 𐥖 | 𐥗 | 𐥘 | 𐥙 | | | | | | |
Notes: 1. As of Unicode version 17.0; 2. Grey areas indicate non-assigned code points

== History ==
The following Unicode-related documents record the purpose and process of defining specific characters in the Sidetic block:

| Version | Final code points (Note: Proposed code points and characters names may differ from final code points and names) | Count | L2 ID | WG2 ID | Document |
|---|---|---|---|---|---|
| 17.0 | U+10940..10959 | 26 | L2/19-106 | | Pandey, Anshuman (2019-04-10), Introducing the Sidetic Script |
| 17.0 | U+10940..10959 | 26 | L2/21-111 | | Pandey, Anshuman (2021-06-10), Preliminary proposal to encode the Sidetic script |
| 17.0 | U+10940..10959 | 26 | L2/21-130 | | Anderson, Deborah; Whistler, Ken; Pournader, Roozbeh; Liang, Hai (2021-07-26), "3 Sidetic", Recommendations to UTC #168 July 2021 on Script Proposals |
| 17.0 | U+10940..10959 | 26 | L2/22-235 | | Pandey, Anshuman (2022-10-14), Revised proposal to encode the Sidetic script in Unicode |
| 17.0 | U+10940..10959 | 26 | L2/22-248 | | Anderson, Deborah; et al. (2022-10-31), "21 Sidetic", Recommendations to UTC #173 October 2022 on Script Proposals |
| 17.0 | U+10940..10959 | 26 | L2/23-019 | | Pandey, Anshuman (2023-01-05), Revised proposal to encode Sidetic in Unicode |
| 17.0 | U+10940..10959 | 26 | L2/23-012 | | Anderson, Deborah; et al. (2023-01-17), "1 Sidetic", Recommendations to UTC #174 January 2023 on Script Proposals |
| 17.0 | U+10940..10959 | 26 | L2/23-005 | | Constable, Peter (2023-02-01), "D.1 Section I.1 Sidetic", UTC #174 Minutes |
| 17.0 | U+10940..10959 | 26 | L2/23-083 | | Anderson, Deborah; Kučera, Jan; Whistler, Ken; Pournader, Roozbeh; Constable, Peter (2023-04-21), "16 Sidetic", Recommendations to UTC #175 April 2023 on Script Proposals |
| 17.0 | U+10940..10959 | 26 | L2/24-166 | | Anderson, Deborah; Goregaokar, Manish; Kučera, Jan; Whistler, Ken; Pournader, Roozbeh; Constable, Peter (2024-07-18), "4. Sidetic", Recommendations to UTC #180 July 2024 on Script Proposals |
| 17.0 | U+10940..10959 | 26 | L2/24-159 | | Constable, Peter (2024-07-29), "Section 4. Sidetic", UTC #180 Minutes |
| 17.0 | U+10940..10959 | 26 | L2/25-133 | | Rizza, Alfredo; Zinko, Michaela (2025-04-13), Update on Sidetic |
| 17.0 | U+10940..10959 | 26 | L2/25-091R | | Kučera, Jan; et al. (2025-04-22), "4.4 Sidetic", Recommendations to UTC #183 (April 2025) on Script Proposals |
| 17.0 | U+10940..10959 | 26 | L2/25-141 | N5308 | Anderson, Debbie; Leroy, Robin; Whistler, Ken (2025-04-26), Sidetic Naming Conventions |
| 17.0 | U+10940..10959 | 26 | L2/25-085 | | Leroy, Robin (2025-04-28), "D.1 4.4 Sidetic", UTC #183 Minutes |
