= Cathedral of St Joseph, Sofia =

Catholic cathedral in Sofia, Bulgaria

Cathedral of St Joseph
- катедрала „Св. Йосиф“
- Catholic Cathedral of St Joseph

- Location of the cathedral in Sofia
- Cathedral of St Joseph
- 42°41′55″N 23°19′11″E
- Location: Sofia
- Country: Bulgaria
- Denomination: Roman Catholic

History
- Status: Co-cathedral
- Dedication: Saint Joseph
- Consecrated: 21 May 2006 (new building)

Architecture
- Functional status: Active
- Architectural type: Church

Specifications
- Capacity: 1,000 worshipers
- Length: 23 m (75 ft)
- Width: 15 m (49 ft)
- Height: 19 m (62 ft)

Administration
- Diocese: Sofia and Plovdiv

The Cathedral of St Joseph (Bulgarian: катедрала „Св. Йосиф“) is a Latin Catholic cathedral in Sofia, the capital of Bulgaria. It is the co-cathedral of the Latin Diocese of Sofia and Plovdiv, together with the Cathedral of St Louis in Plovdiv.

The cathedral, rebuilt at its previous location after it was destroyed by Allied bombing raids during World War II, was inaugurated on 21 May 2006 in the presence of Cardinal Secretary of State Angelo Sodano, Dean of the College of Cardinals. The foundation stone of the new cathedral was laid personally by Pope John Paul II during his visit to Bulgaria in 2002.

== Overview ==
The Cathedral of Saint Joseph is the largest Catholic cathedral in Bulgaria has 350 seats and can hold up to 1,000 worshipers. The cathedral is 23 metres (75 ft) long, 15 metres (49 ft) wide, 19 metres (62 ft) high, and the main body of the building has a roof height of 23 metres (75 ft). The tower is equipped with four electronically operated bells and is 33 metres (108 ft) high. The cathedral is equipped with body and over the altar stands 7-metre (23 ft) wooden cross of Christ. Under cross is the icon of Mary (mother of Jesus), given by Patriarch Maxim at the dedication of the temple.

On both sides of presbytery are two statues, the patron of St. Joseph Cathedral and Capuchin patron St. Francis of Assisi.

On the right side of the entrance is the icon of God's Mercy with the inscription: "Jesus, I trust to thee." This icon is linked to the devotion to the Divine Mercy and the coming of Jesus into the world Faustina Kowalska. At the entrance is the statue of the Mary (mother of Jesus) in Lourdes in 1858 appeared to St. Bernadette Subiru to be declared as a pure conception. On the other side of the gate of the cathedral are the statues of some of the most popular saints in the Catholic Church - St. Therese of the Child Jesus, Carmelite barefoot and St Anton from Padua Franciscan.

To the fence of the cathedral is a statue of Pope John XXIII, which was consecrated by Pope John Paul II during his visit in 2002 in the parish.

== Services ==
Holy Mass services:

- Saturday 6 pm - Bulgarian;
- Sunday 9 am - Polish;
- Sunday 10:30 am - Bulgarian;
- Sunday 12 pm - English;
- Sunday 6 pm - Bulgarian;

== Gallery ==
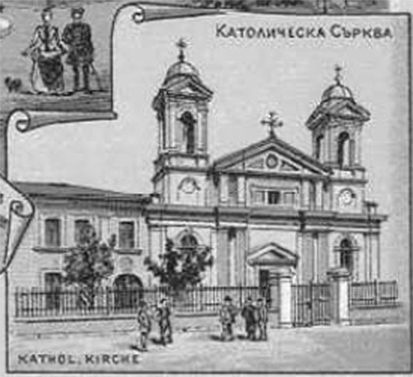
The cathedral as it appeared in the late 19th century

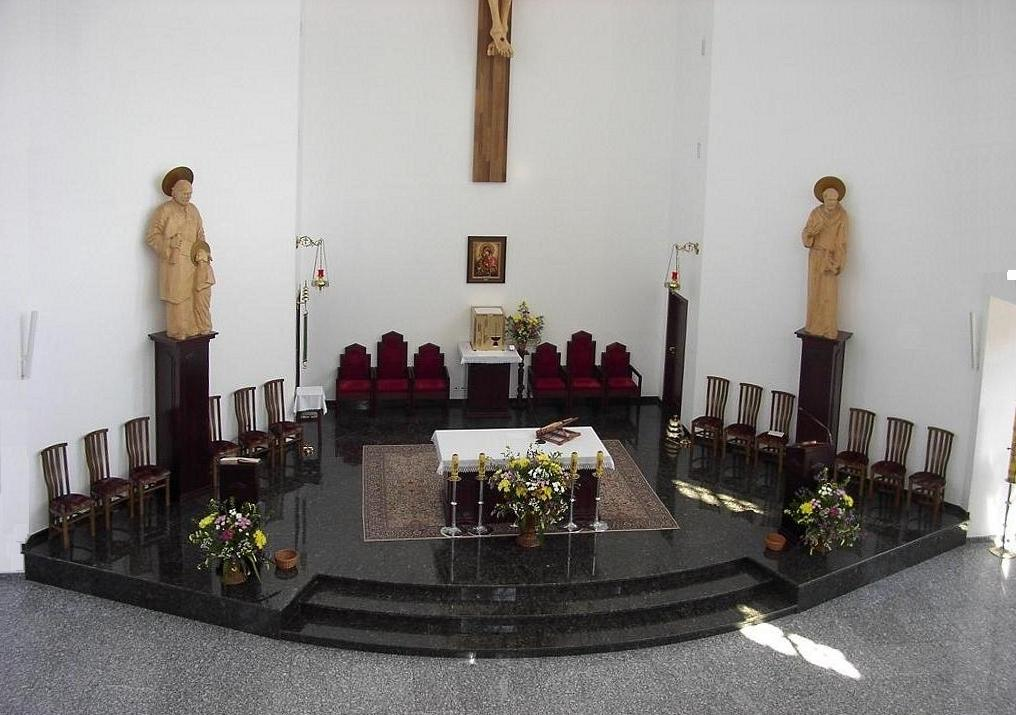
The altar

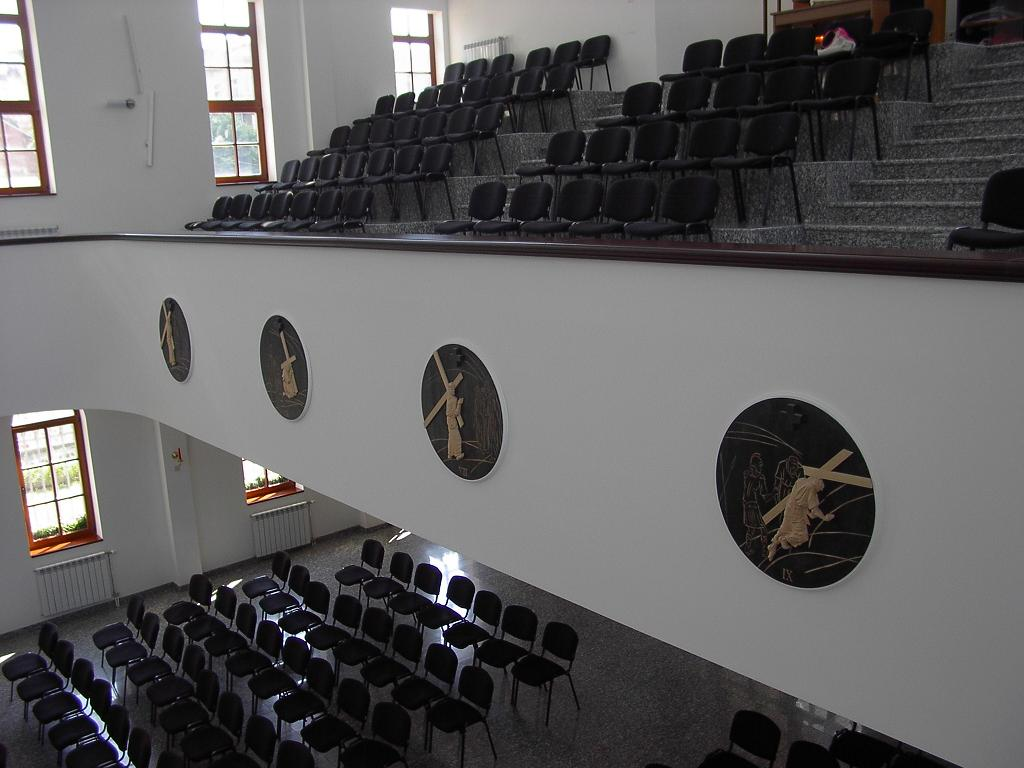
The balcony

== See also ==
- Catholic Church in Bulgaria
- List of churches in Sofia
