= Kamen Petkov =

Bulgarian architect

- Architect Kamen Petkov, 1863–1945
- Born: 1863; Belogradchik, Bulgaria
- Died: 1945 (aged 81–82); Plovdiv, Bulgaria
- Occupation: Architect
- Awards: Орден за Гражданска Заслуга (Order for Citizen Merit) (1938)
- Buildings: Cathedral of St Louis, Plovdiv; Bulgarian National Bank Building, Plovdiv (1989–1900); French Girls' College, Plovdiv (1915); Tobacco Warehouses, Plovdiv (1925–1932); Catholic Church, Gen. Nikolaevo, Plovdiv (1931)

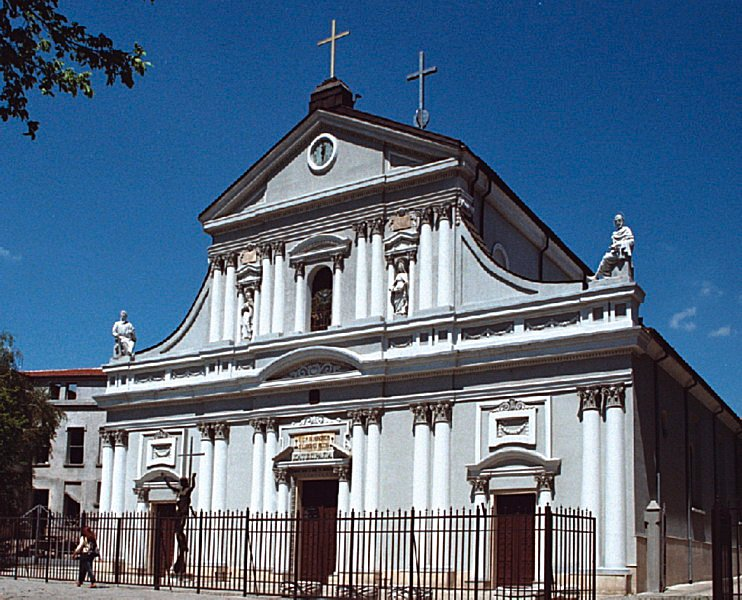
The Catholic Cathedral in Plovdiv, Bulgaria, built between 1930 and 1931.

Elevation of a private home in Plovdiv, by Architect Kamen Petkov, dated 1914.

Kamen Petkov (Bulgarian: Камен Петков, 1863–1945) was a Bulgarian architect based in Plovdiv, Bulgaria.

== Biography ==
Kamen Petkov was born in 1863 in the small village Beloptichene (today Ruzhintsi). He was the son of Petko Simeonov. After completing high school in Vratsa, he served in the military service and then worked for several years as a teacher.

He had a desire to study in the Academy of Arts. At that time, scholarships for this school not leave because it was thought that Bulgaria needed more builders, engineers and architects. In 1892, Petkov went to study architecture as a government scholar at the Polytechnic of Karlsruhe, Germany, where he graduated in 1896. After graduation, he returned to Bulgaria and began working in Vratsa and later Sofia where, together with the artist Alexander Bozhilov and others, took part in the Circle "Bulgaria".

In 1898 he moved to Plovdiv and worked there until his death on February 17, 1945.

== Career ==
Petkov designed and built more than 800 buildings in Plovdiv alone. Most of them still shape the specific architecture of the city centre. Ten buildings can be seen along the Main Street alone, beginning with the powerful impact of the Bulgarian Bank (1898), and followed by smaller buildings influenced by the Vienna Secession architects. Their façades are decorated with fluted pilasters crowned with composite capitals; arched windows articulated by decorative columns, and curvilinear ornaments. Plant-inspired motifs, such as blossoming small trees, ornamental garlands, and festoons of flowers, demonstrate a strong Art Nouveau influence.

In the French girls college, 1915 and boys college, 1932 respectively, however, he opted for a drastic geometric design. The contrasting frames of the shallow-arched windows and the dark highly stylized stucco pilasters create a strong graphic effect.

The four- and six-floor high tobacco warehouses are among Petkov's largest works. The mansard above the main cornice is supported by massive consoles. Fluted risers articulate the large volumes into proportionate shapes. The design is an excellent mature integration of the functional and aesthetic aspects of a building for the industry.

In his early seventies, Petkov won a competition organised by the Vatican among Bulgarian and Italian architects for the reconstruction and building of several Catholic churches in the region of Plovdiv which had been severely damaged in an earthquake in 1928. Thus he came to design the frontal part and the interior of the largest Catholic cathedral in the Balkan peninsula. His design resembles Italian neoclassicism; the main façade is lined with six pairs of columns, while two cornices form the base of the frontón, which is flanked by the statues of St. Peter and St. Paul and decorated with stylised floral forms.

The Tobacco Warehouses in Plovdiv, Bulgaria, built between 1925 and 1932.

Of the Catholic churches built by Petkov around Plovdiv, the ones in the villages of Gen. Nikolaevo and Sekirovo are the largest, each with a capacity of 2000 people. Both are designed as three-nave basilicas with two bell towers and a frontón in between. The façades are decorated with columns and pilasters, plastic cornices and stucco ornaments.

== Works ==
After Petkov arrived in Plovdiv, he befriended fellow architects Joseph Schnitter and M. Pernigoni, with whom he designed several buildings. Andronikos and arch. A. Torniov that leaving the city wrote in the local newspaper that "... is calm, because here he will be replaced by Arch. Kamen Petkov ... ".

In 1903, Petkov married Radka Georgieva Popova, the daughter of socialite Georgi Popov, an associate of Vasil Levski and member of its revolutionary committee. Petkov had four children, two daughters and two sons, with Popova. One of his sons, George K. Petkov (1917–1991) became an architect working in the Plovdiv area; George's son Kamen Petkov (1950–1993) and grandson Georgi Petkov (1973 -) themselves became architects.

Petkov's work also includes the houses of Orozov and Shipkov in Kazanlak (later used for the Town Council), the house of Dr. T. Vitanov in Vidin (subsequently used for the Youth House), and the Bulgarian National Bank in Burgas. Several houses that Petkov designed have been destroyed – Samokovlieva house was demolished during the construction of a tunnel under Nebet, house Kalchev, replacing the Party House and many others – one torn down for new construction, others collapsed the time.

Petkov's buildings are distinct and form part of the architectural appearance of Plovdiv's city centre, creating an 'architectural skeleton' after the Liberation.

== Building technology in the late 19th and early 20th century ==
By the time Arch. K. Petkov begins work, the walls of the buildings were always massive – foundations and cellar of stonework and up bearing brick walls. Inter-floor structures are almost always wooden beams or iron beams profile "double T" filled with flat brick arches (Prussian vault). The roofs are always wooden, covered with tiles (very rarely sheet). This method of performance is underlying one-man design – the architect was the sole author of the building and has solved all architectural and structural issues including trending calculations. With the advent of reinforced concrete in construction after 1930 calculations begin to make an engineer-constructor.

Here appears the question of details – doors, windows, mostly plaster and stucco, which abound in architectural sculpture of the Arch. Kamen Petkov. Often it was impossible in advance all the details to be drawn – it happened on the construction site, by hand drawings and instructions of the designer with some experience of the contractor, as the architect had the obligation and the right to require several samples to select it Find the best and appropriate.

Also a big role in the construction played and craftsmen, contractors details – plasterers, carpenters and blacksmiths that the architect himself has selected and who knew his tastes and requirements and could only a sketch to understand the thought and desire of the author. They fulfilled with craft experience, without him having to produce countless drawings. For example, the project for the building of Jewish charity, "Shalom alaikum" is located on one single sheet, size 60/80 cm, but in comparison with the project executed building differences were not detected. What could not be shown in the drawing was explained very thorough and clarified during the author's supervision. However, the building is not poor in details. Similar is the case with the project for a residential building on E. Kondodimo the main street No.9. Beautiful facade with its exquisite wrought iron railings not mapped detail. The same applies to the building on the street. "R. Daskalov "5 whose details drapery decorative pilasters, hand-painted by the artist in the area. 1:1 for many years were kept in his home.

The system of sole design (only architect) divides the year into two periods – in winter designs and draws, and in summer guided construction.

== Catholic churches and Catholic Cathedral in Plovdiv ==
In adulthood Architect Kamen Petkov gets achieving a major task – with funds granted by the Vatican as an aid for victims of the great earthquake in 1928, the Catholic population in Plovdiv and around the villages. To carry out the design of several projects: restoration of the Catholic cathedral "St. Ludwig"; Catholic school" St. Andrew"; and the Catholic Diocese, all three in Plovdiv. Also Catholic churches in the villages of General Nikolaevo; Sekirovo, Belozem Parchevich and Borets. Arch Petkov received that task after winning a competition among several Bulgarian and Italian architects. The jury is done in the Vatican.

Catholic cathedral "St. Ludwig" in Plovdiv was originally built during the time of Monsignor (Bishop) Andrea Canova from 1850 to 1861 when illuminated. The architect and builder are unknown. During the earthquake the church suffered greatly – broken main facade with two small towers on both sides, in which nearly died Papal Nuncio Monsignor Roncalli, who later became pope under the name John XXIII. The earthquake becomes peak Easter lunch.

In 1929–1930, the architect. Petkov design new front facade in the spirit of Italian neoclassicism. Once the main facade was restored in 1931, the cathedral is lit in 1932, the roof burned, some of the remaining walls are destroyed and requires the building to be renovated. This time arch. Petkov develops its whole interior while retaining the main lines and parts of the foundations of the basilica and directs the work mainly to the interior.

Over bulk is newly poured concrete slab cassette and over it was built wooden roof covered with tiles. The church was buried queen Maria Luisa, mother of King Boris III. Over the sarcophagus was placed portrait statue of the queen of white marble. The sarcophagus and the statue are illuminated through stained with Bulgarian and Bourbon coat of arms. The belfry was built in 1902 by architect Mariano Pernigoni.

Catholic Diocese of Plovdiv. After the earthquake in 1928, simultaneously with the restoration of the cathedral arch. Petkov designs and Metropolis, which is located next to it. Unlike the Catholic cathedral, bishop's palace is emphasized Sezession character [1].

School "St. Andrew "(subsequently School of landscaping) was built in 1931 as a third element in the composition.

Catholic church, the village of General Nikolaev. Catholic church, village Sekirovo – completed in 1931 to winning the Vatican declined competition and several Catholic churches in villages near Plovdiv. The biggest of them are those in the villages of General Nikolaevo and Sekirovo – today districts of Rakovski. They are built on almost identical projects due to long-standing rivalry between the two villages, allow- one of the churches to greater or different, which could be interpreted as "more beautiful." There is some difference in the facade. Are solved as a basilica holds about 2,000 worshipers with two square towers.

Catholic church Belozem – completed in 1931. The church is smaller than that of General Nikolaevo, also with two towers that are more Bulgarian treatment – not Italian campaigns and octagonal vertical volumes.

Catholic church, village Parchevich – completed in 1931, today the town of Rakovski. This church is considerably less than the previous three-aisled cruciform basilica with an octagonal tower above the main entrance. Catholic church, village Fighter – completed in 1931 and the project implementation are the same as those of the church in the village Parchevich.

Uniate Church, Plovdiv – completed in 1931 basilica with clearly marked signs of Orthodox church construction. Stained glass project is Bulgarian artist, and implementation of colored glass and lead frames is done in France. Under the church there is a large crypt, where alongside the portraits of the Pope and Parchevich away and a portrait of the architect. Kamen Petkov.

== Recognition ==
In 1930, Petkov, as an active member of IAC (Engineering and Architectural Association) and the 70th anniversary was awarded by the Ministry of Construction and Architecture with the "Civil Merit". In 1992, the Municipal Council of the city named a street after Petkov. From 2012, the Vocational School of Architecture, Civil Engineering and Geodesy in Plovdiv was also named after him.

(This biography research is based on a lecture on the life and work of Arch. Kamen Petkov, delivered by his son Arch. Georgi Petkov Kamenov to his colleagues from the Union of Architects in Bulgaria in May 1989)
