= Pamphylian Greek =

Dialect of Ancient Greek

- Region: Pamphylia
- Era: 5th century BC to 1st century AD
- Language family: Indo-European: Hellenic; Greek; (disputed); Pamphylian Greek

Language codes
- ISO 639-3: –
- Linguist List: grc-pam
- Glottolog: None

Pamphylian was a little-attested dialect of Ancient Greek that was spoken in Pamphylia, on the southern coast of Asia Minor. Its origins and relation to other Greek dialects are uncertain, though a number of scholars have proposed isoglosses with Arcadocypriot. It is the sole classical era dialect which did not use articles, suggesting that it split off from other dialects early. Some of its distinctive characteristics reflect potential language contact with Anatolian languages spoken nearby. It has been found that the Pamphylian dialect was likely unintelligible for speakers of other Greek dialects such as Attic or Koiné.

== History ==
=== Documentation ===
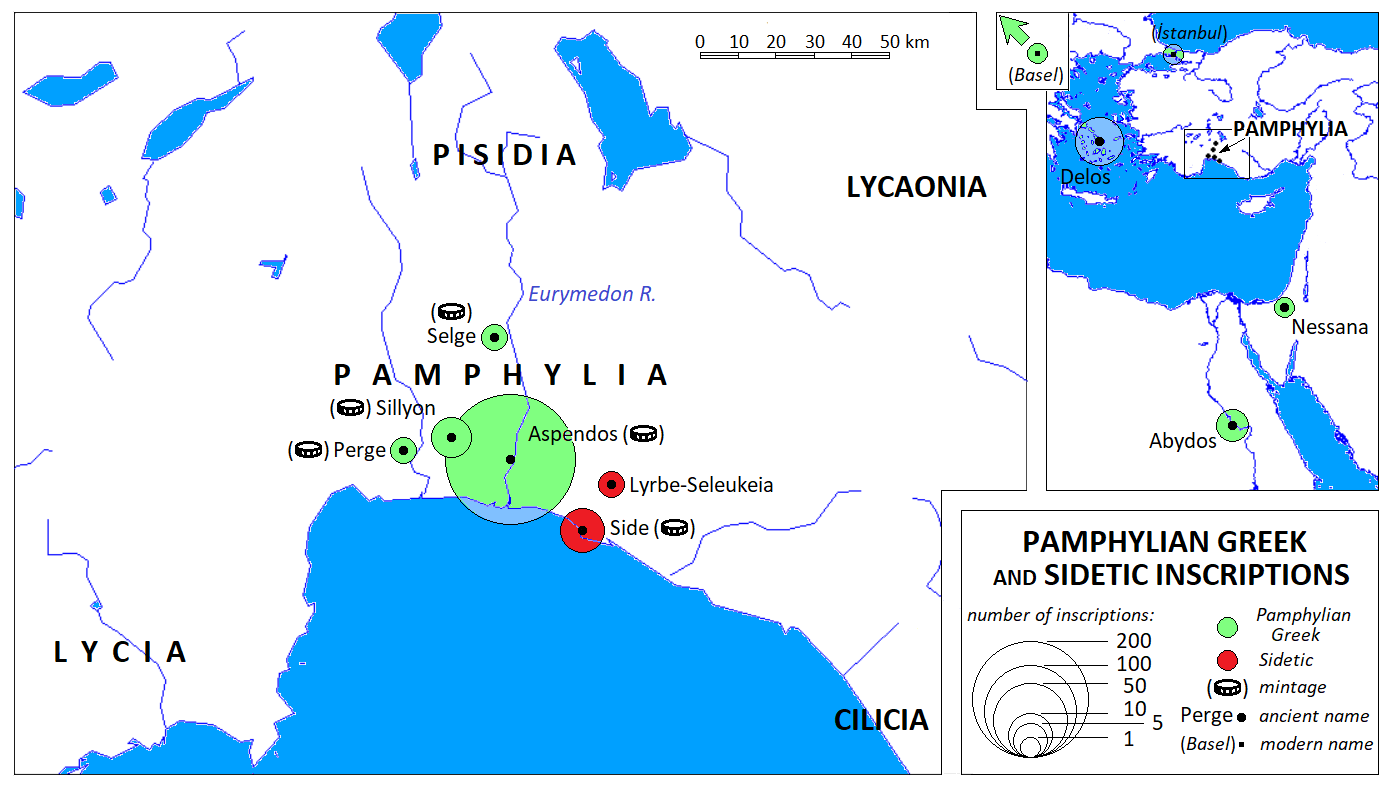
Map showing where inscriptions in the Pamphylian script and dialect have been found.

Pamphylian is known from about 300 inscriptions, most of them from the Pamphylian city of Aspendos. Nearly all of them are short and funeral and consist of names only. Pamphylian graffiti giving single names have also been found abroad, in Egypt (Abydos) and Delos. The longest inscription is a 36 line decree from Aspendos, first analyzed in detail in 1880 by William M. Ramsay. Inscriptions are dated from the fifth century BCE to the Roman period, most of them being from the second century BCE.

Coins issued by Pamphylian cities also bear the script. Some 30 Pamphylian single words are known from glosses given by Hesychius, Eustathius, and the Etymologicum Magnum.

=== Language contact ===
Pamphylic Greek appears to have been heavily influenced by nearby Anatolian languages such as Lycian, Pisidian, and Sidetic, in both phonology and syntax. In morphology and lexicon, Anatolian influence apparently was much more limited.

The phonological influence of Anatolian on Pamphylic has been characterized as "massive structural interference", affecting both the consonant and vowel repertoire. Aspirates gave way to fricatives, as did stop consonants.

In syntax three specific peculiarities stand out: absence of the article "the", use of the dative with pre- and postpositions where other Greeks would use a genitive, and the use of a special expression και νι + imperative.

All of these features can be explained as an adaption of the Greek language by imperfect second-language speakers: if a small group of colonizing Greek immigrants remained a minority in an area inhabited by Anatolian speaking people, the heavily accented Greek spoken as a second language by the local population, coloured by their native Anatolian language, would become the norm in the area. Because Pamphylia was an isolated region ("a backwater, relatively inaccessible"), there were few external stimuli to later change this situation.

== Writing system ==
Pamphylian digamma

Pamphylia had a variant local alphabet, which was probably borrowed from other Greek alphabets. According to Selvi & Santamaria (2023) the Pamphylian alphabet stems from the 'dark blue' alphabets of North Eastern Peloponnese. The alphabet was used until the end of the 1st cent. BCE.

| Sign | Α | Β | | Δ | Ε | Ϝ | | Η | Θ | Ι | ΙΙ | Κ | Λ | Μ | 𐅨 | 𐅡 | Ο | Π | Ρ | Σ | Τ | Υ | Φ | + | Ω | | |
| Attic approximation | Α | Β | Γ | Δ | Ε, Η | (Ϝ) | Ζ | ῾ (Η) | Θ | Ι | Ι | Κ | Λ | Μ | Ν | Ξ | Ο, Ω | Π | Ρ | Σ | Τ | Υ | Φ | Χ | Ω | Ͷ | Ͳ |
| Transliteration | α | β | γ | δ | ε, ε̄ | ϝ | ζ | h (η) | θ | ι | ιι | κ | λ | μ | ν | ξ | ο, ō | π | ρ | σ | τ | υ | φ | χ | ω | и | ͳ |
| IPA sound | a | b | g | d | e, ɛ: | v | sd? | h (ɛ:) | tʰ | i, j | i:ʲ | k | l | m | n | ks | o, ɔ: | p | r | s | t | y | pʰ | kʰ | ɔ: | w | ss? |

The Pamphylian alphabet made use both of the original Pamphylian digamma (Ͷ) and a standard digamma (Ϝ). It has been surmised that the original sound /w/ in some environments (after vowels) was represented by Ͷ; where the sound had changed to labiodental /v/ in the Pamphylian dialect, it was represented by Ϝ. Sometimes Ͷ also stood in the place of beta. It was found by Selvi & Santamaria (2023) that the Pamphylian alphabet originated from a process of selection, adaptation, and refunctionalization of a Northeast Peloponnesian model. This region, closely linked to Pamphylia by mythological and historical ties, used dark blue alphabets from Corinth to Argos, influenced by other Peloponnesian centers like Sparta. The use of ⟨Ͷ⟩ declined in the 4th century but persisted until the end of the Hellenistic period for sociocultural reasons. The Northeast Peloponnesian corpus doctrinae, encompassing the alphabets of the region, already had features of the Pamphylian alphabet. ⟨Ϝ⟩ represented the posterior approximant, and ⟨forͶ⟩ was linked to the letter for /b/ in Corinth, possibly also representing /w/. When this system reached Anatolia, it became the Pamphylian alphabet through interaction with Anatolian alphabets and the phonetic changes in the Pamphylian dialect. This resulted in the variable use of ⟨Ͷ⟩, ⟨Ϝ⟩, and ⟨B⟩ during both Classical and Hellenistic periods, leading to their overlapping phonetic values.

Pamphylian sampi

There is also a psi-like sampi, used probably to represent the sounds /s/, /ss/, or /ps/.

A conspicuous element in Pamphylian texts are double iotas, where the first iota denotes an /i/-sound and the second a glide /j/.

The Η sign usually represents a /h/-sound (rough breathing); only rarely, in a few late inscriptions, it is apparently used to represent the classical Greek eta vowel (/ɛ:/ or /i:/).

Eustathius, quoting Heraclides, says that the Pamphylians "liked the /b/-sound so much that they often put b's in"; for example, instead of aëlios ('Sun'), they said babelios. And the Etymologicum Magnum says that they tended to swallow /s/-sounds and pronounce them as a 'hairy' (δασύς) sound, i.e., a rough breathing: instead of mousika they said mōˁika. (One may compare a similar phenomenon in the Anatolian languages, where, for example, Milyan masa, 'god', is an older counterpart of Lycian maha.)

An inscription from Perge dated to around 400 BC reads: Ͷανάαι Πρειίαι Κλεμύτας Λϝαράμυ Ͷασιρϝο̄τας ἀνέθε̄κε (Wanassāi Preiiāi Klemutas Lvaramu Wasirvōtas anethēke, 'Klemutas the wasirvotas, son of Lvaramus, dedicated this to the Queen of Perge').

In eastern Pamphylia, the Pamphylian cities Side and Lyrbe-Seleukia used another language and script, called Sidetic.

== Vocabulary ==
The following lexicon was extracted from the work A Greek–English Lexicon:

- ἀβελιακόν/abeliakon – 'solar' (Attic: ἡλιακόν, heliakon)
- Ἀβώβας/Abôbas – Adonis (Attic: ὁ Ἄδωνις)
- ἄγεθλα/agethla – 'sacrificial victims' (Attic: 'the driven ones')
- ἀγός/agos – 'priest' (Attic: hiereus, Cf. agô lead)
- ἀδρί/adri (Attic: ἀνδρί, andri, dative of aner meaning 'to (for) the man')
- Ἀηδών/Aêdôn or Ἀβηδών/Abêdôn – 'Athena'
- αἰβετός/aibetos – 'eagle' (Attic: ἀετός, aetos)
- ἀμείνασις/ameinasis – 'mentha' (Attic: ἡδύοσμον, hêdyosmon)
- Ἀπέλο̄ν/Apelon (Attic: Ἀπόλλων)
- ἄρκυμα/arkuma – 'locust' (Attic: ἀκρίς, akris)
- ἀτρώποισι/atrôpoisi or ἀτρο̄́ποισι dative, plural (Attic: τοῖς ἀνθρώποις, tois anthropois, 'to/for the people')
- βαβέλιος/babelios – 'sun' (Cretan and Doric: ἀβέλιος, abelios; Laconian: βέλα, bela; Aeolic: ἀέλιος, aelios; Ionic: ἠέλιος, ēelios; Attic: helios)
- βόϝα/bova – 'oxen, cattle'? (Attic: bota boes)
- βο̄λε̄μενυς/bolemenus – 'willing' (Attic: boulomenos) (ἐβο̄λᾱσετυ/ebolasetu – 'they wanted to' (Attic: eboulêthêsan)
- βουρικυπάρισσος/bourikuparissos – 'vineyard' (Attic: ampelos)
- Εστϝεδιιυς/Estvediius – 'Aspendios' or 'Aspendian'
- ϝέτιια/vetiia – 'years' (Attic: etê; Homeric: etea; Locrian, Elean, and Arcadocypriot: Wetos; Latin: vetus)
- ϝίλσις/vilsis – 'distress' (genitive of vilsiios).
- ἰκτίς/iktis – 'weasel, skunk, cat or member of Felidae' (Attic: αἴλουρος, aílouros; Attic: iktis)
- ἴοδυ/iodu – imp. 'they should go' (Attic: iontôn)
- κασσύας/kassuas – 'thunnus' (Attic: ὄρκυνος, orkunos, orcynus)
- κατεϝέρξοδυ/kateverxodu (katarxontôn?)
- κόρκορας/korkoras – 'bird or rooster' (Modern Greek: kókoras)
- κόρταφος/kortaphos – 'temple (anatomy)' (Attic κρόταφος, krotaphos)
- λάφνη/laphnê – 'Daphne' (Attic: δάφνη)
- λάψα/lapsa – 'turnip' (Attic: γογγυλίς, gongulis)
- νι/ni – 'in' or 'one' (Attic: en or hen)
- ὀρούβω/oroubô – 'rush forward' (Homeric: orouô, ornumi)
- πέδε/pede – 'five' (Attic: πέντε, pente; Modern Greek: pende, informal pede)
- περτέδο̄κε/pertedoke – 'he gave' (Attic: prosedôke; Aeolic: pres for Attic pros)
- πηρία/pêria – 'field or farm'
- σαράπιοι/sarapioi – 'small fish, picarel, or maenidae' (Attic: μαινίδες, mainides)
- σισίλαρος/sisilaros – 'partridge' (Attic: πέρδιξ, perdix)
- σκυδρὺ/skudru
- τριμίσκον/trimiskon – 'clothing' (Attic: himation, tribon; Koine: trimitos or trimiton meaning 'garment of drill or ticking')
- ὕλογος/hulogos – 'army' (Attic: stratos; Attic: σύλλογος, syllogos meaning 'reunion' or 'gathering')
- Ͷανάͳα Πρειία/Wanassa Preiia – 'lady-goddess' (Homeric: ϝάνασσα see wanax; Κλεμύτας Λͷαραμυ Ϝασιρͷο̄τας 'dedicated it to her')
- ͷοῖκυ/woiku – 'house' (Attic: oikos; Cretan and Locrian: ϝοικία, Woikia)
- ͷρυμάλια/wrumalia
- φάβος/phabos – 'light' (Homeric: phaos; Attic: phôs)
- φεννίον/phennion (Attic: μηδικὴ ὁδός, 'Medean road')
- φίκατι/phikati – 'twenty' (Attic: eikosi; Laconian: beikati; Aeolian, Doric: weikati).

=== Onomasticon ===
The following onomastic lexicon was based on Claude Brixhe's Dialecte grec de Pamphylie:

- Ἀθιμῖϝυς Athimivus and Ἀθιμεϝς
- Ἀπελάͷρυͷις Apelawruwis
- Ἀρτιμίνα Artimina Ἀρτιμίδωρυς Artimidôrus (Attic: Artemidôros)
- Ἁφαστυς Aphastus (Attic: Hephaistos)
- Ἀφορδίσιιυς Aphordisiius (Attic: Aphrodisios)
- Βαλυς Balus
- Βοβᾶς Bobas, Βοβᾶτυς
- Γουκαλις Goukalis
- Δέξιϝυς Dexivus (Attic: Dexios)
- Διβῶτυς Dibôtus
- Διϝίδωρυς Dividôrus (Attic: Diodôros) Διϝ- also in Cypriot names
- Διϝονούσιυς Divonousius (Attic: Dionysios)
- Ἑλλόθεμις Ellothemis (Cf. Cypriot: Ἑλλόϝοικος, Ellowoikos from Homeric esthlos meaning 'good', 'brave')
- Εστλεγιιυς Estlegiius
- Εχϝαλια Echvalia
- Ζοϝαμυς Zovamus
- Ζώϝειτους Zôveitous
- Ϝανάξαδρυς Vanaxadrus – wanax + anêr
- Ϝαρνόπα Varnopa Ϝάρνιτους Warnitous
- Ϝεχιδάμυς Vechidamus (Attic: Echedamos)
- Ϝέχιτους Vechitous (Attic: Echetos)
- Ϝουκω Voukô
- Θανάδωρυς Thanadorus (Attic: Athenodôros)
- Κέδαιϝις Kedaivis
- Κεσκεὺς Keskeus Κεσκῖϝους Keskiwous
- Κοπερίνα Koperina
- Κορϝαλίνα Korvalina – 'little girl' (Arcadocypriot: korwa)
- Κόρραγυς Korragus Ἀσπέδιιυς Aspediius 'Aspendian'
- Κουρασιὼ Kourasiô
- Κυδρομολις Kudromolis
- Λαυδίκα Laudika (Attic: Laodikê)
- Μιαλίνα Mialina or Meialina (Attic: Megalina, Μιακλις Miaklis; Attic: Megaklês)
- Μουριξους Mourixous
- Μουρμακω Mourmakô
- Νεϝοχάρις Nevocharis (Attic: Neocharês and Νεϝόπολις Newopolis)
- Ὀρυμνιϝυς Orumnivus
- Πεδδᾶτος Peddatos
- Πελλαυρύις Pellauruis
- Περίϝεργυς Perivergus (Attic: periergos)
- Ποναμελδῶς Ponameldôs
- Πορσόπα Porsopa
- Πρεῖϝυς Preivus
- Σϝαρδιας Svardias and Ισϝαρδιας (Lydian: Sfardẽtiš, 'inhabitant of the Lydian capital Sfard, Sardes')
- Ͷαναξίωνυς Wanaxiônus
- Φορδισία Phordisia (Attic: Aphrodisia)
- Χορείνα Choreina

== See also ==
- Arcadocypriot Greek
- Mycenaean Greek
- Ancient Macedonian Greek
- Ancient Greek dialects
- Anatolian languages

== Sources ==
Primary sources

- Hesychius of Alexandria

Secondary sources

- Brixhe, Claude. Le Dialecte Grec de Pamphylie. Paris/Istanbul, 1976.
- Panayotou, A. "Pamphylian" (Maria Chritē and Maria Arapopoulou. A History of Ancient Greek: From the Beginnings to Late Antiquity. Cambridge University Press, 2007 ISBN 0-521-83307-8, pp. 427–432). Article in Greek: Παμφυλιακή.
- Selvi, Eleonora and Santamaria, Andrea. "Shaping the Pamphylian alphabet: the puzzle of the two digammas" Kadmos, vol. 62, no. 1-2, 2023, pp. 95-114. https://doi.org/10.1515/kadmos-2023-0005
