= Josep Manyanet i Vives =

Spanish Roman Catholic priest (1833–1901)

Saint Josep Manyanet i Vives SF
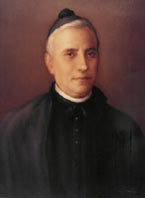

Priest
- Born: 7 January 1833; Tremp, Lleida, Kingdom of Spain
- Died: 17 December 1901 (aged 68); San Andreu del Palomar, Barcelona, Kingdom of Spain
- Venerated in: Roman Catholic Church
- Beatified: 25 November 1984, Paris, France by Pope John Paul II
- Canonized: 16 May 2004, Saint Peter's Square, Vatican City by Pope John Paul II
- Feast: 16 December (former); 17 December
- Attributes: Priest's cassock
- Patronage: Sons of the Holy Family; Missionary Daughters of the Holy Family

Josep Manyanet i Vives, SF (7 January 1833 – 17 December 1901) was a Catalan Roman Catholic priest and the founder of the Sons of the Holy Family and the Missionary Daughters of the Holy Family. He served in a range of capacities as a parish priest before establishing both religious orders in order to spread devotion to the Holy Family to whom he fostered an intense devotion.

The sainthood cause commenced under Pope Pius XII on 25 November 1956 – in which he was titled as a Servant of God – while Pope John Paul II named him as Venerable in 1982. The same pope beatified him on his trip to Paris in 1984 and later canonized him as a saint in mid-2004 in Saint Peter's Square.

== Life ==
Josep Manyanet i Vives was born in Tremp in 1833. His baptism was celebrated on the date of his birth. His father died while he was an infant in September 1834.

In 1888 his mother offered him up to the Madonna as a special consecration and the parish priest Valentín Lledós helped him cultivate his religious calling. He received his education with the Piarists in Barbastro and then went on to be trained in the seminaries at Lleida and La Seu d'Urgell. He was ordained to the priesthood on 9 April 1859 and went on to become the aide of the Bishop of Urgel Josep Caixal Estradé. Other tasks he had been assigned to included being the librarian at one of the seminaries. On 28 June 1864 he founded a male religious order and followed that up on 19 March 1874 with a female branch. The male order received diocesan approval on 3 February 1894 and then the papal approval of Pope Pius XII well after his death on 16 December 1950 while the female order received the decree of praise from Pope Leo XIII on 30 April 1887 and papal approval from him on 22 June 1901 not long before the priest died. He worked for the construction of a church in Barcelona that the noted architect Servant of God Antoni Gaudí built. He also founded a school in Barcelona in 1895.

He was subjected to prolonged illnesses during his life which included open sores on his side that he had labelled "God's mercies" for well over a decade. He died on 17 December 1901 at the school he established in Barcelona; his last words were: "Jesus, Mary and Joseph, may I breathe forth my soul in peace with you." His remains are kept in a burial chapel at the same school where he died. In 2005 there were 193 religious - 136 of them priests - in a total of 43 houses worldwide in places such as Brazil and Mexico.

== Sainthood ==
The beatification cause commenced in Barcelona in 1931 in an informative process that Archbishop Manuel Irurita i Almándoz inaugurated and later concluded. All his spiritual writings received theological approval on 7 January 1951. The formal introduction to the cause came under Pope Pius XII on 25 November 1956 and he was titled as a Servant of God as a subsequent result; the Congregation for Rites validated the informative process in Rome on 20 May 1967. The officials from the Congregation for the Causes of Saints and their consultants approved the cause on 10 February 1982 while the C.C.S. later met themselves to approve it as well on 22 June 1982. The late priest was named as Venerable on 12 July 1982 after Pope John Paul II confirmed that he had indeed lived a model life of heroic virtue.

The process for a miracle needed for beatification opened in Barcelona in a diocesan process that Cardinal Narcís Jubany Arnau oversaw from July 1981 until October 1981 while the C.C.S. validated this process on 29 October 1982. A medical board approved it on 27 January 1984 as did the theologians consulting them on 26 April 1984 and the C.C.S. on 22 May 1984. John Paul II approved this on 9 June 1984 and beatified the priest on his visit to Paris in France on 25 November 1984. The miracle involved the cure of Mrs. Francisca Trías Iglesias from a gastrointestinal hemorrhage on 15 October 1960.

The second miracle - the one for sainthood - was investigated in a diocesan process in Medellín that Archbishop Alberto Giraldo Jaramillo opened and closed in 1997 while it later received validation on 6 February 1998. A medical board approved it on 6 March 2003 as did the theologians on 17 June 2003 and the C.C.S. on 16 December 2003. John Paul II approved this miracle on 20 December 2003 and canonized him as a saint of the Roman Catholic Church on 16 May 2004 in Saint Peter's Square. The miracle was the healing of Sister Manuela Burbano Ortiz - from his women's order - from comedocarcinoma infiltrating the right breast in a clinic in Colombia on 28 January 1995.

== Published works ==
- A Priceless Family Gem (1909)
- The Spirit of the Holy Family
- Selected Works (1911)
- Complete Works
