= Simidicca =

Roman era civitas of the Roman province of Africa Proconsolare

Africa Proconsularis (125 AD)

Simidicca was a Roman era civitas of the Roman province of Africa Proconsularis.

The ancient city is tentatively identified with ruins at Henchir-Simidia Tunisia.

The city was also the seat of an ancient Christian bishopric, suffragan of the Archdiocese of Carthage. Only one bishop of this diocese is known Adeodatus, a Catholic bishop who participated in the Conference of Carthage of 411, which saw gathered together the bishops Catholics and Donatists in Roman Africa; the headquarters at that time had no Donatist bishops. The same Adeodatus was present at the Council of Carthage (419) held by St Aurelius. Today the diocese survives as a titular bishopric; the last bishop was Rumen Stanev, of Sofia.
