= Giorgio Radovani =

Giorgio Angelo Radovani (Latin: Georgius Angelus Radovani, Albanian: Gjergj Engjëll Radovani; 1734–1790) was an Albanian prelate of the Roman Catholic Church.

== Life ==
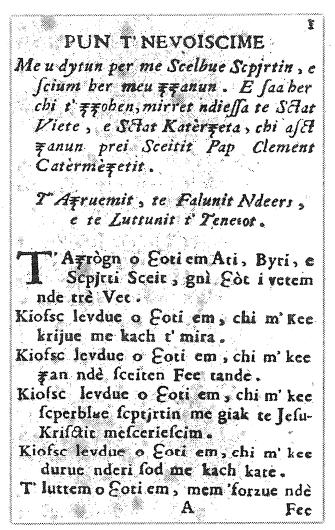
First page from Pun t'nevoiscime by Radovani, printed most probably in 1776 by Propaganda Fide in Rome.

Radovani was born in İşkodra (Shkodër), at the time part of the Ottoman Empire (modern northern Albania) in 1734.

From 1767 to 1771 he served as the apostolic vicar of the Diocese of Sofia and Plovdiv. In 1771 he was ordained as Bishop of Shkodër. During his tenure he founded the diocese's first Catholic school in the village of Sheldi. In 1776 he submitted his Albanian translations of the Catholic prayers for publication to the Propaganda Fide. From 1787 to his death in 1790 he served as Archbishop of Antivari. In 1788 he mediated the negotiations between the Holy Roman Emperor, Joseph II and Kara Mahmud Bushati regarding an anti-Ottoman alliance between the two factions. He died at Ancona, on 15 November 1790.

== See also ==
- Niccolò Angelo Radovani
- Antonio Angelo Radovani
- Andrea Angelo Radovani, count
- Agostino Radovani
- Kosta Angeli Radovani
- Vincenzo Angelo Radovani
