= Sons of the Holy Family =

Institute of consecrated life for priests in the Catholic Church

Congregation of the Sons of the Holy Family
- Congregatio Filiorum Sacrae Familiae, Iesu, Mariae et Ioseph
- Abbreviation: S.F.
- Formation: March 19, 1864 (162 years ago)
- Founder: Josep Manyanet i Vives
- Type: Catholic Institute of Consecrated Life
- Headquarters: Carrer d'Entença, 301; Barcelona, Spain
- Location: 41°23′20″N 2°8′20″E
- Superior General: Fr. Jesús Díaz Alonso, S.F.
- Website: www.manyanet.org

The Congregation of the Sons of the Holy Family of Jesus, Mary and Joseph (Latin: Congregatio Filiorum Sacrae Familiae, Iesu, Mariae et Ioseph; abbreviated S.F.) is an institute of consecrated life for priests in the Catholic Church (a type of clerical religious congregation of pontifical right for men). The congregation is dedicated to educating the young and strengthening Catholic family life.

== Organisation ==
The general headquarters are in Barcelona, Catalonia, Spain. As of 2013 there were 38 houses and 161 members (including 128 priests).

=== Superiors general ===
- Magin Morera
- Father Luis Picazo Ustrell, S.F. (d. 7 January 2011)
- The current superior general is Father Jesús Díaz Alonso, S.F.

== History ==
=== Foundation ===
The Sons of the Holy Family was founded in Tremp, Spain, on March 19, 1864, by Josep Manyanet i Vives. A Catholic priest and the son of a peasant farmer, Manyanet founded the congregation out of his great concern for children and family life. He believed that Catholic education comprised the "most suitable, simple, and practical means of reforming the family and society with it", and that the Holy Family was the exemplary model for strong Catholic families. Not long afterwards, Manyanet also founded a complementary congregation for women, the Missionary Daughters of the Holy Family of Nazareth.

The founding of the Sons of the Holy Family was part of a wide movement in Spain, as many new religious congregations were being founded in the same period. These congregations were mostly of teaching religious, though lay associations flourished as well.

The Sons of the Holy Family received an informal decree of approval (decretum laudis) from Pope Leo XIII on April 30, 1887, and were given formal approval by the Holy See on June 20, 1901. Manyanet died on December 17, 1901, in Barcelona, only a few months after this formal approbation. Today he is formally recognized as a saint in the Catholic Church, as he was canonized on May 16, 2004, by Pope John Paul II.

=== Expansion ===
The congregation was well established by 1965, with teaching foundations operating in Spain, Italy, the United States and Argentina.

The Sons of the Holy Family had arrived in the United States in 1920, and ministered to the Spanish-speaking population in the Archdiocese of Santa Fe. Today, the American regional headquarters and seminary is located in Silver Spring, Maryland, and the Sons of the Holy Family maintain eight houses in the US, mostly in the Southwest.

The congregation is present today in several European countries, North and South America, and in Africa as well. It counted about 250 members in 27 foundations worldwide by 2011.

== Mission and charism ==
Our centers are called 'of the Holy Family' because Jesus, Mary, and Joseph are not only the patrons and protectors but also the model that they should imitate in virtue and firm love of work, since this was the principal aim of the hidden life of Jesus in the humble house of Nazareth.

— Saint Josep Manyanet i Vives

Priests of the congregation describe themselves as "witnesses and apostles of the mystery of Nazareth," by which is meant a contemplation of the so-called "hidden years" of Jesus Christ, during which he lived in the family home in Nazareth and was obedient to Mary and Joseph. As such, the congregation's stated charism is to "promote devotion to the Holy Family and to foster true Christian family life." The congregation aims to achieve this goal through educating and forming young people and building up families.

== Notable members ==
=== Saints and Blessed members ===
Besides the founder, Saint Joseph Manyanet, other members of the congregation are in the process of being canonized.

- In May 2012, Pope Benedict XVI approved the beatification of Blessed Jaime Puig and 19 companions, religious and a layman who were murdered during the Spanish Civil War, between 1936 and 1939.
- The Servant of God Magin Morera, former Superior General of the order, is another candidate to be canonized.
- The Missionary Daughters of the Holy Family of Nazareth have started the beatification process of Mother Encarnación Colomina, their co-founder.

=== Prelates from their ranks ===
- Francisco González Valer, Titular Bishop of Lamphua and Auxiliary Bishop emeritus of Washington, D.C. (USA)

== Sources and external links ==
- Official website
- GCatholic
- Hijos de la Sagrada Familia at Catholic-Hierarchy.com
