= Seleucia (Pamphylia) =

Ancient city in Anatolia

Seleucia/Lyrbe
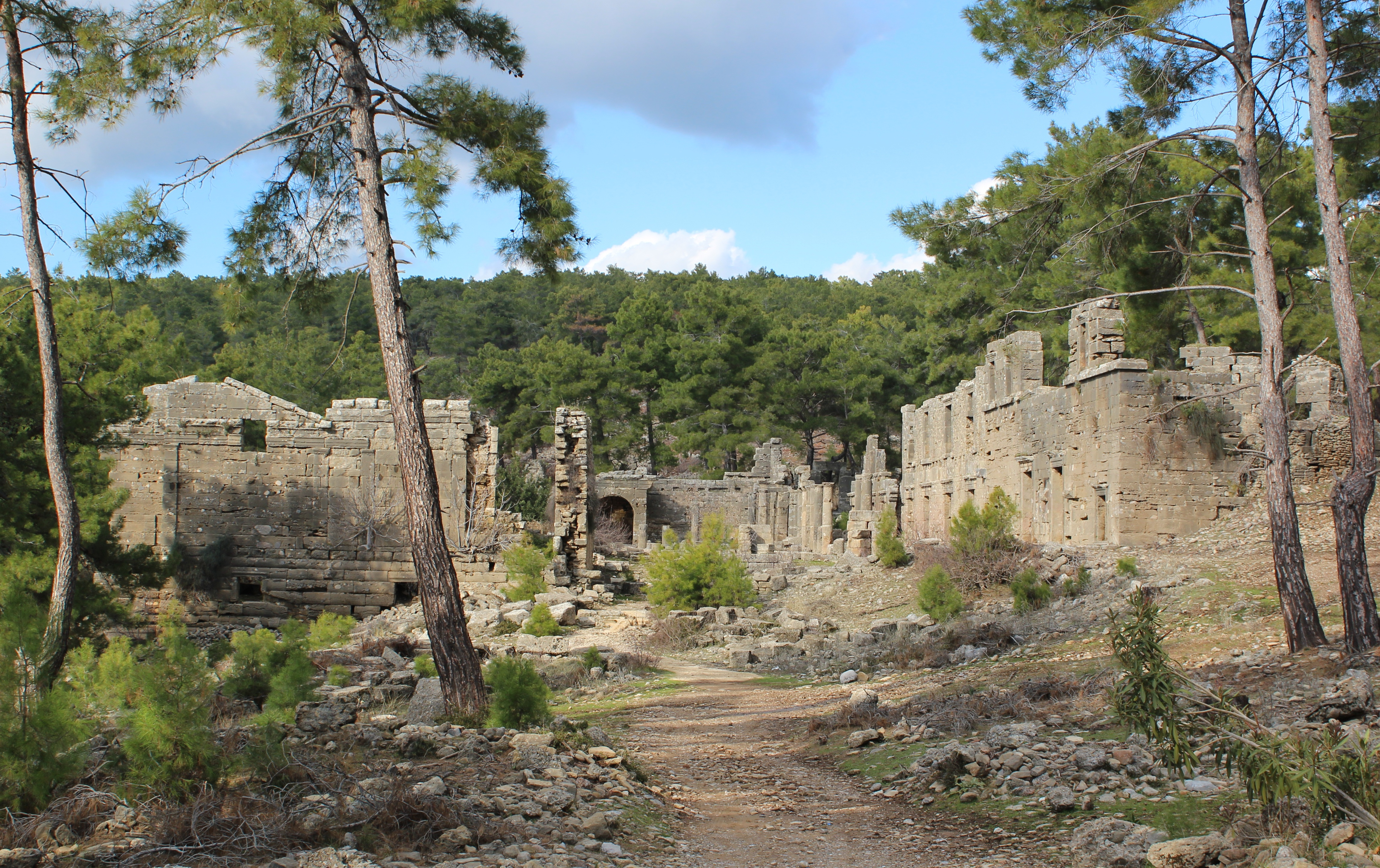
- Overview of Seleucia (2012)

- Location within Turkey
- 36°52′29″N 31°28′24″E
- Type: Settlement
- Location: Antalya Province, Turkey
- Region: Pamphylia

Site notes
- Condition: In ruins

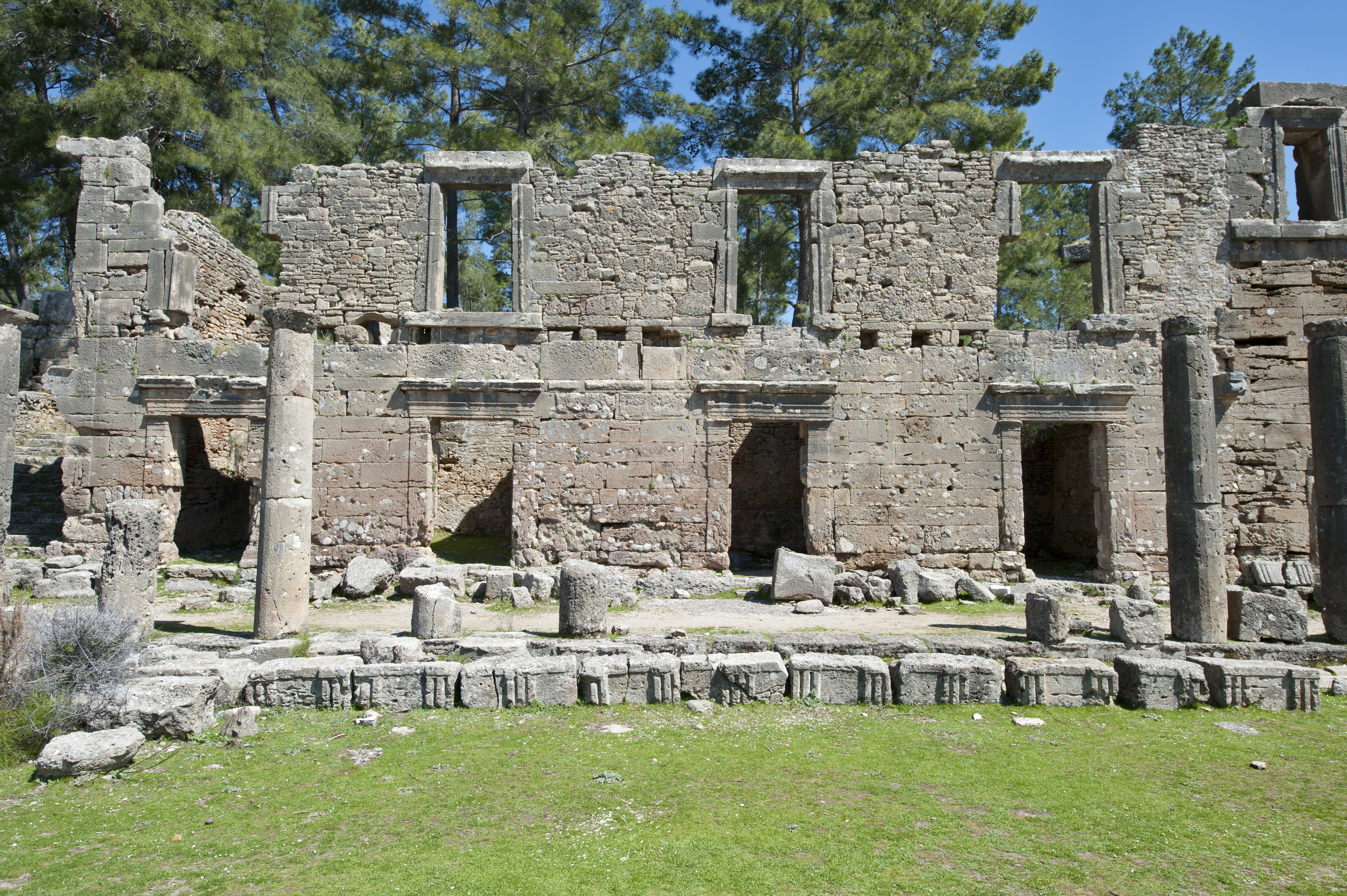
Agora

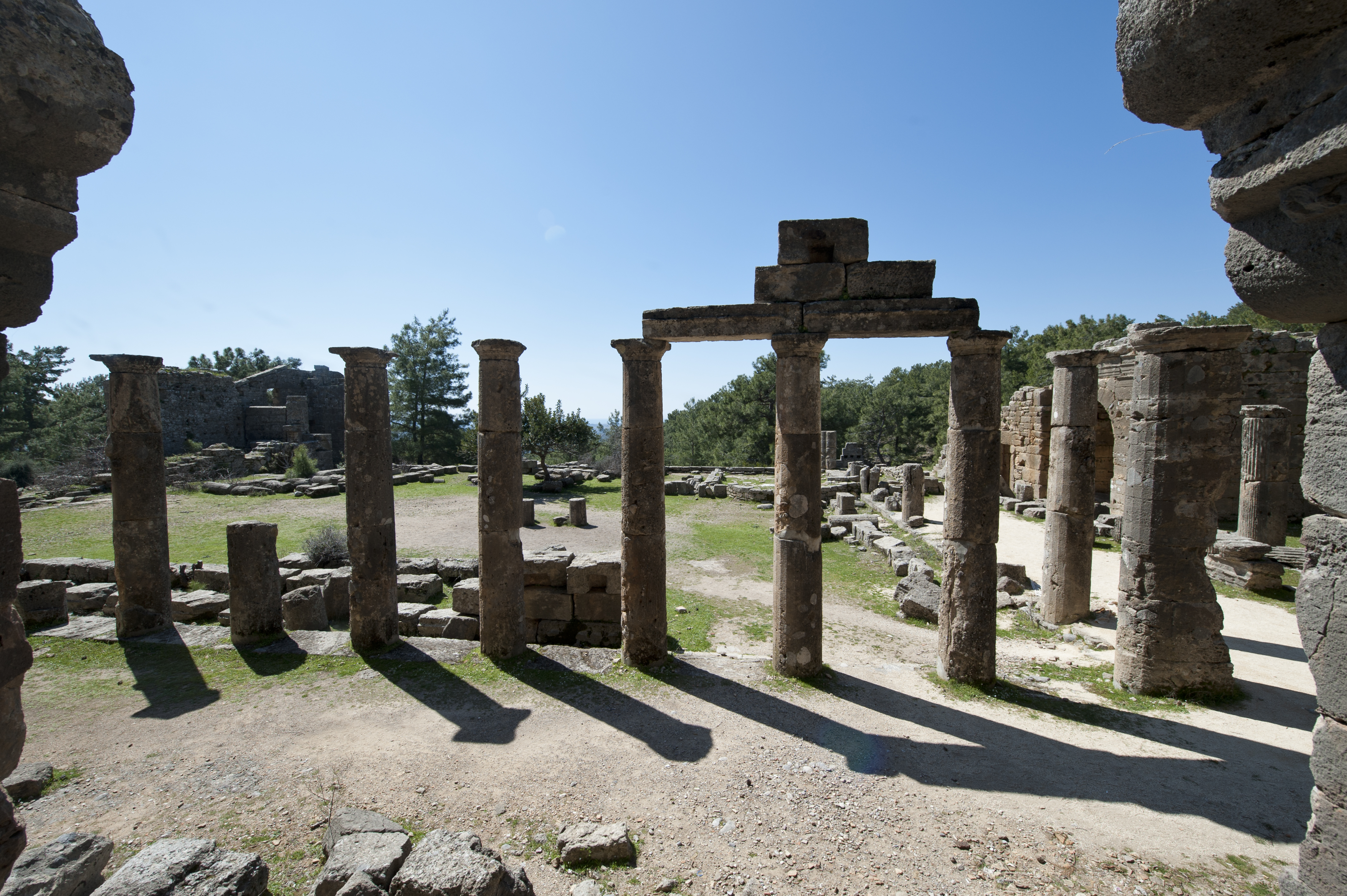
Agora

Seleucia (Greek: Σελεύκεια – also transliterated as Seleukeia) was originally an ancient Greek city on the Mediterranean coast of Pamphylia, in Anatolia, approximately 15 km northeast of Side; the site is about 1 km north of the village of Bucakşeyhler (also Bucakşıhler), approximately 12 km northeast of Manavgat, Antalya Province, Turkey. Modern scholars, however, place Pamphylian Seleucia near Şıhlar, north of the mouth of the Peri Su, west of Side. and the remains at this location are rather considered those of Lyrba.

Another name for the city in the Middle Ages was Scandalor, which was documented on portolan maps.

It is situated on a hilltop with steep escarpments on several sides making a strong defensive position.

== The site ==
There are remains of an agora containing a row of two-storey and three-storey building façades, a gate, a mausoleum, a Roman bath, a necropolis, in addition to several temples and churches.

Because of its remote location, the site has not been plundered for building materials and the area is littered with columns and other items like large grindstones for flour making.
