= Ivan Romanov (Catholic bishop) =

Roman Catholic bishop

His Excellency Ivan Romanov
- Vicar Apostolic of Sofia and Plovdiv
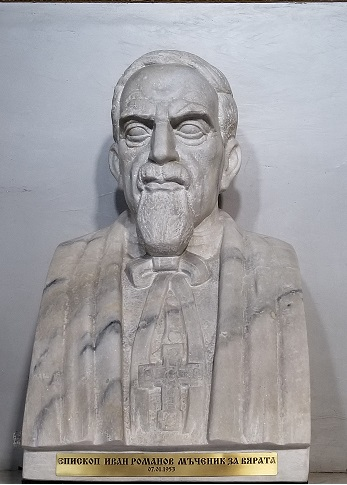
- Archdiocese: Roman Catholic Diocese of Sofia and Plovdiv
- See: Roman Catholic Diocese of Sofia and Plovdiv
- Appointed: 6 July 1942
- Installed: 6 July 1942
- Predecessor: Archbishop Roberto Menini

Orders
- Ordination: 21 January 1901
- Consecration: 4 October 1942

Personal details
- Born: 10 September 1878 Rakovski, Bulgaria
- Died: 8 January 1953 (aged 74) Shumen, Bulgaria

Styles of Ivan Romanov
- Reference style: The Most Reverend
- Spoken style: Your Excellency
- Religious style: Monsignor
- Posthumous style: Bishop

Ivan Romanov (Bulgarian: Иван Романов; 10 September 1878 – 8 January 1953) was a Bulgarian Roman Catholic bishop and an Apostolic Vicar of Sofia and Plovdiv.

== Life ==
Romanov was born in Baltadzhii (now the town of Rakovski). He was ordained a priest on 21 January 1901. On 6 July 1942 he was elected Sofia - Plovdiv Apostolic Administrator and Bishop of the Titular Prisriana. On 4 October 1942 he was consecrated as a bishop.

During the trials against Catholic priests in Bulgaria, Romanov was arrested by the People's Militia. On 29 October 1952 Sofia District Court examined the case of Romanov. The accusation was spying. His conviction sentence was 12 years imprisonment. On 8 January 1953 Romanov died in prison in Shumen after many tortures.

His process of beatification (together with the Fathers Capuchin Flavin Mankin and Fortunat grocers) started on 17 November 1998 and since then he bears the title "servant of God".
