= Cathedral of St Louis (Plovdiv) =

Catholic cathedral in Plovdiv, Bulgaria

Coordinates: 42°8′40″N 24°45′9″E

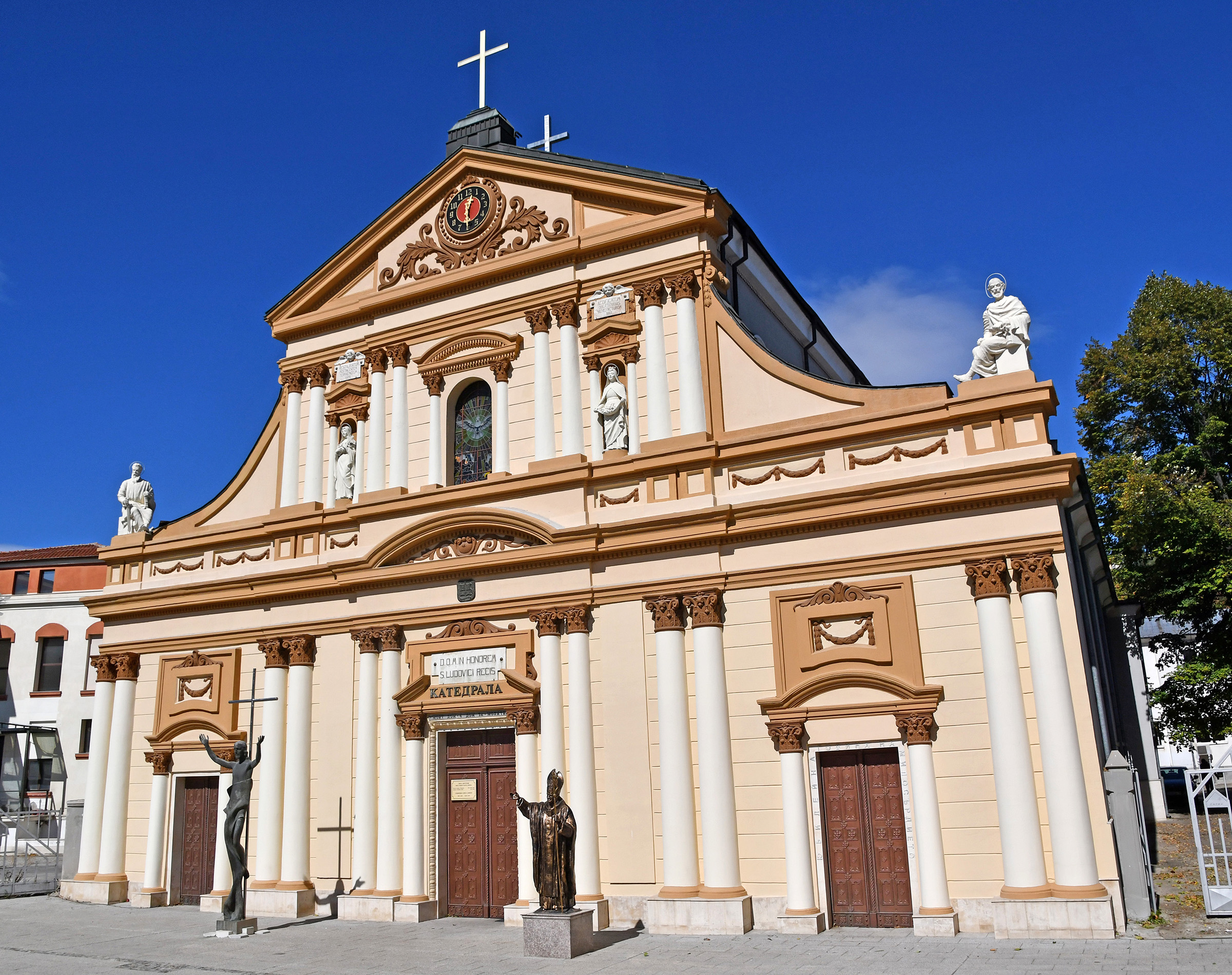
Cathedral of St Louis, Plovdiv

The Cathedral of St Louis (Bulgarian: катедрала „Свети Лудвиг“, katedrala „Sveti Ludvig“) is a Roman Catholic cathedral in the city of Plovdiv, Bulgaria. Co-cathedral of the Diocese of Sofia and Plovdiv together with the Cathedral of St Joseph in Sofia, it is one of the largest and most important Roman Catholic places of worship in the country. It was named after Louis IX of France, commonly known as "Saint Louis".

The cathedral was constructed in the 1850s, during the time of vicar Andrea Canova. The first organ in Bulgaria was installed in the cathedral in 1861, later replaced with a newer and larger one. A fire severely damaged the cathedral in 1931 and destroyed the wood-carved ceiling. The cathedral was reconstructed, with Krastyo Stamatov creating the frescoes and Kamen Petkov being the main architect. The cathedral was once again inaugurated on 8 May 1932. Architecturally, it features an eclectic combination of Neoclassicism and Neo-Baroque.

The belfry was built in 1898 and was equipped with five bells cast in the German city of Bochum, a gift from Pope Leo XIII. A new 12-stop pipe organ was installed in 1991.

Princess Marie Louise of Bourbon-Parma, first wife of Ferdinand I of Bulgaria, is buried inside the cathedral, at the far end, to the right of the altar. An inscription in Bulgarian and Latin on her life can be read on both sides of the tomb.

Pope John Paul II visited the cathedral on 26 May 2002, and met with members of a local Roman Catholic Church youth group.
