= Lamphua =

Titular diocese in Algeria

Lamphua, or Castellum Phuensium, was an ancient city and bishopric in Roman Africa and remains a Latin Catholic titular see.

Its present location is Aïn-Foua, in modern Algeria.

== History ==
Lamphua was important enough in the late Roman province of Numidia to be one of its many suffragan sees, but was to fade.

== Titular see ==
The diocese was nominally restored in 1933 as a titular bishopric (Curiate Italian name variant Lamfua).

It has had the following incumbents, all of the lowest (episcopal) rank :

- Luigi Cicuttini (1966.09.07 – 1971.01.05)
- Philip Francis Smith, Oblates of Mary Immaculate (O.M.I.) (1972.06.26 – 1980.03.14) as Apostolic Vicar of Jolo (Philippines) (1972.06.26 – 1979.04.11) and Coadjutor Bishop of Cotabato (Philippines) (1979.04.11 – 1979.11.05); later succeeded as Metropolitan Archbishop of Cotabato (1979.11.05 – retired 1998.05.30)
- Sofio Guinto Balce (1980.05.09 – 1988.05.21)
- Gheorghi Ivanov Jovčev (1988.07.06 – 1995.11.13)
- Jacson Damasceno Rodrigues, Redemptorists (C.SS.R.) (1996.12.18 – 1998.03.16)
- Philip Huang Chao-ming (黃兆明) (1998.06.27 – 2001.11.19)
- Francisco González Valer, Sons of the Holy Family of Jesus, Mary and Joseph (S.F.) (2001.12.28 – 2024.03.04), Auxiliary Bishop emeritus of Washington (USA)
- Lawrence J. Sullivan, Auxiliary Bishop of Chicago (2024.12.20 - )

== See also ==
- Catholic Church in Algeria

== Source and External links ==
- GCatholic, with titular incumbent links
