= Lyrbe =

Ancient city in Cilicia

Lyrba
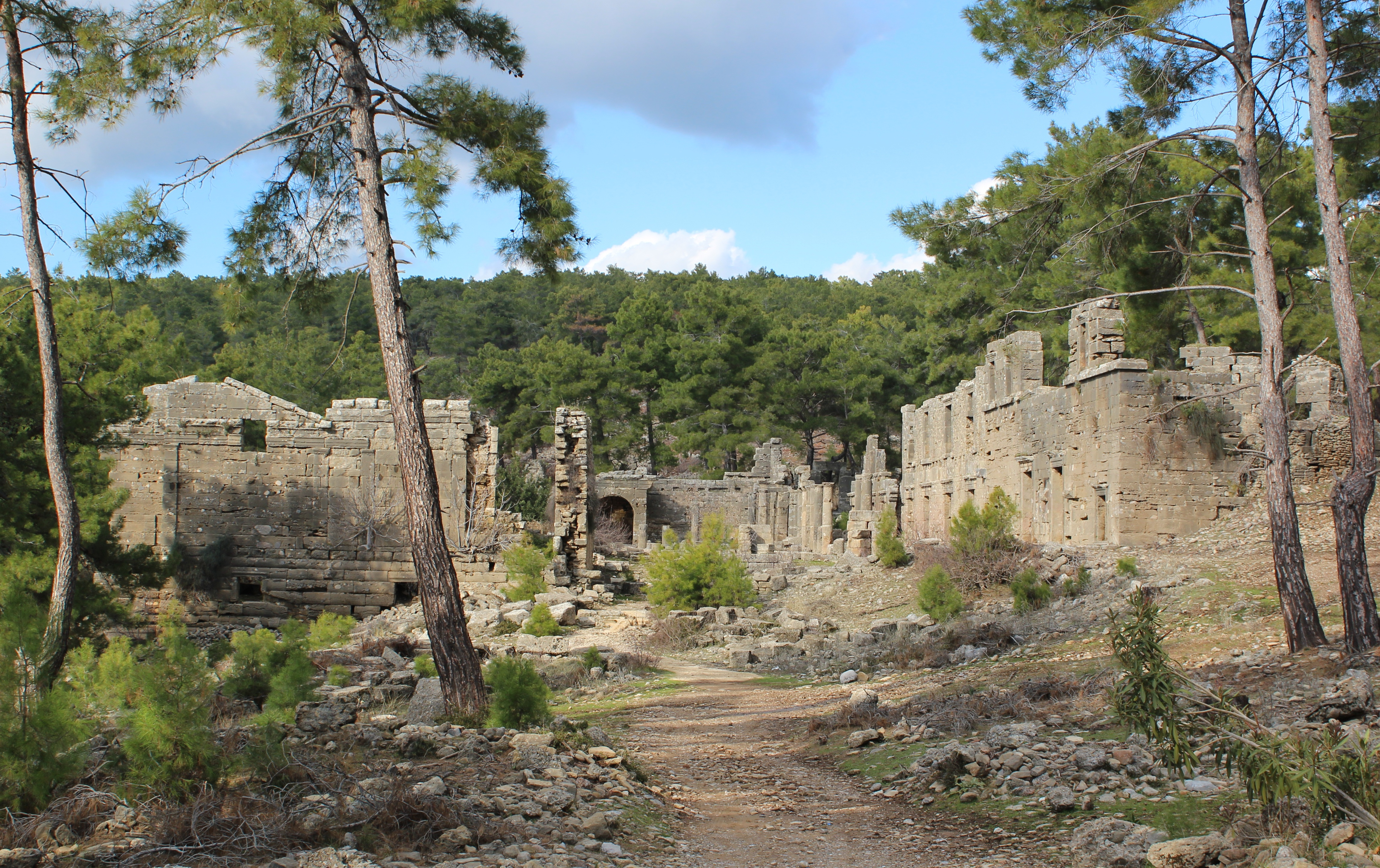
- A general view of Lyrbe

- Location within Turkey
- 36°52′29″N 31°28′24″E
- Type: Settlement
- Location: Antalya Province, Turkey
- Region: Pamphylia

Site notes
- Condition: In ruins

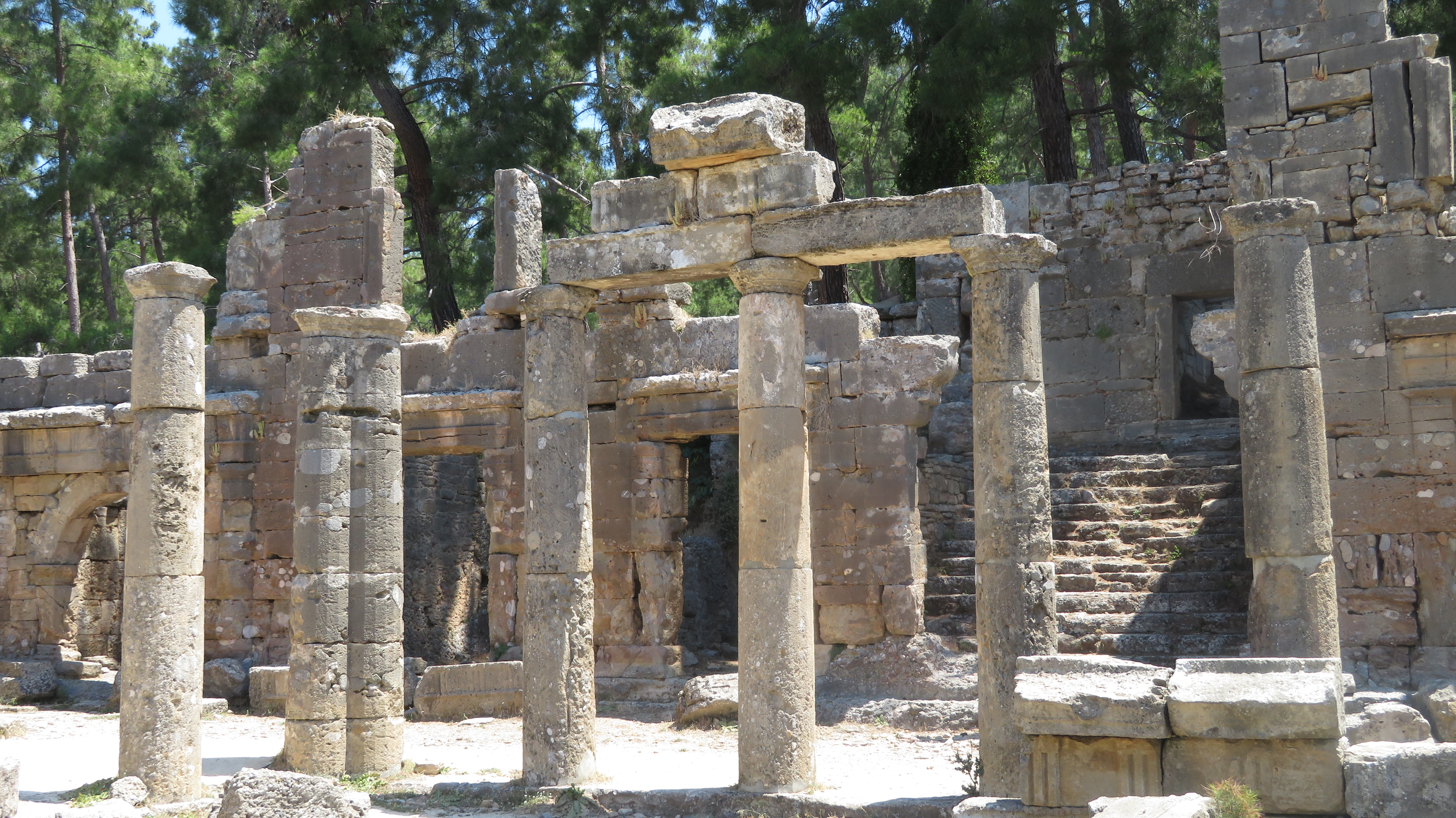
The Agora of Lyrbe

Lyrbe (spelled Lyrba in the 1910 Catholic Encyclopedia; Ancient Greek: Λύρβη) was an ancient city and later episcopal see in the Roman province of Pamphylia Prima and is now a titular see.

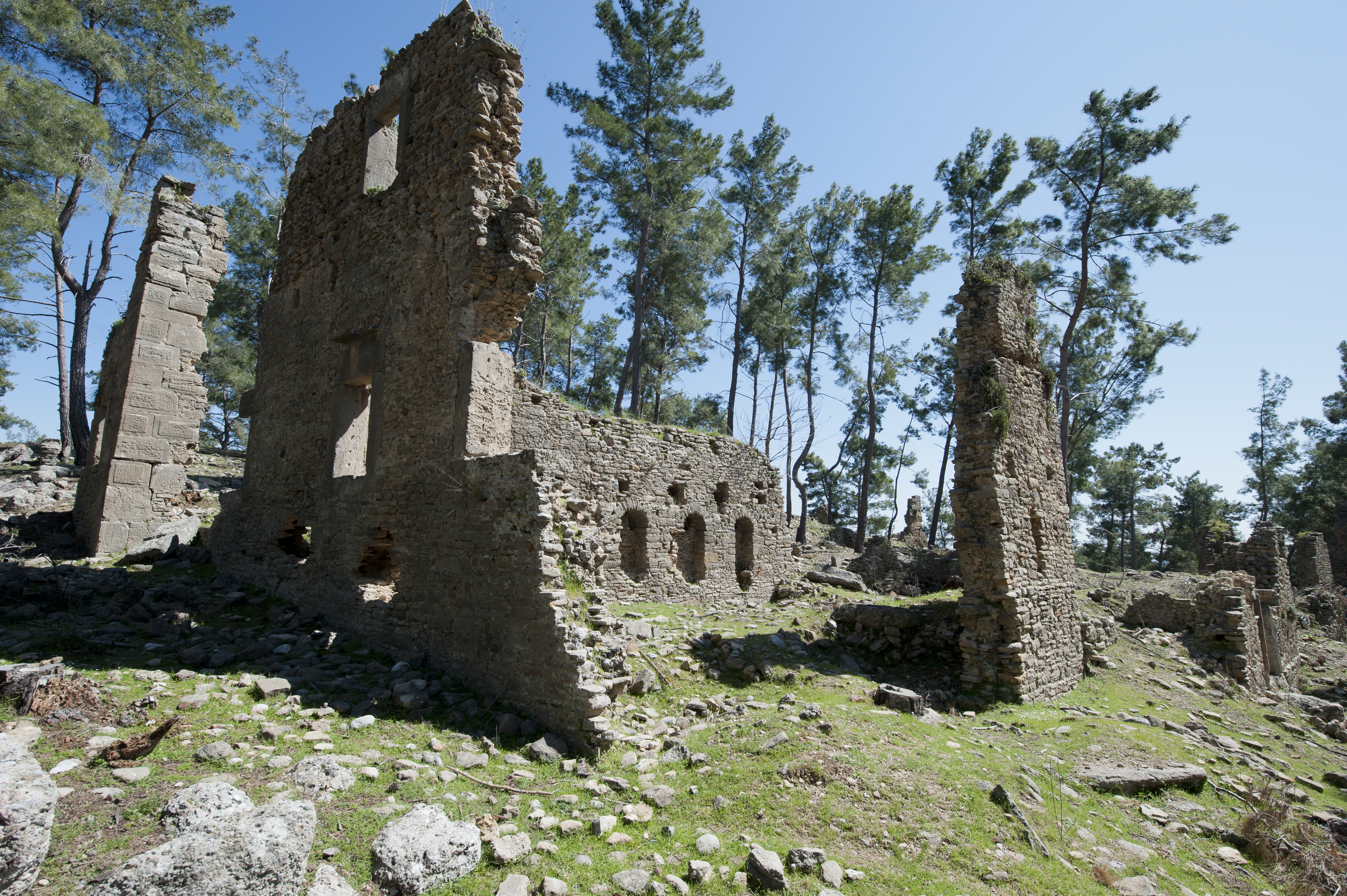
A structure to the east of the agora

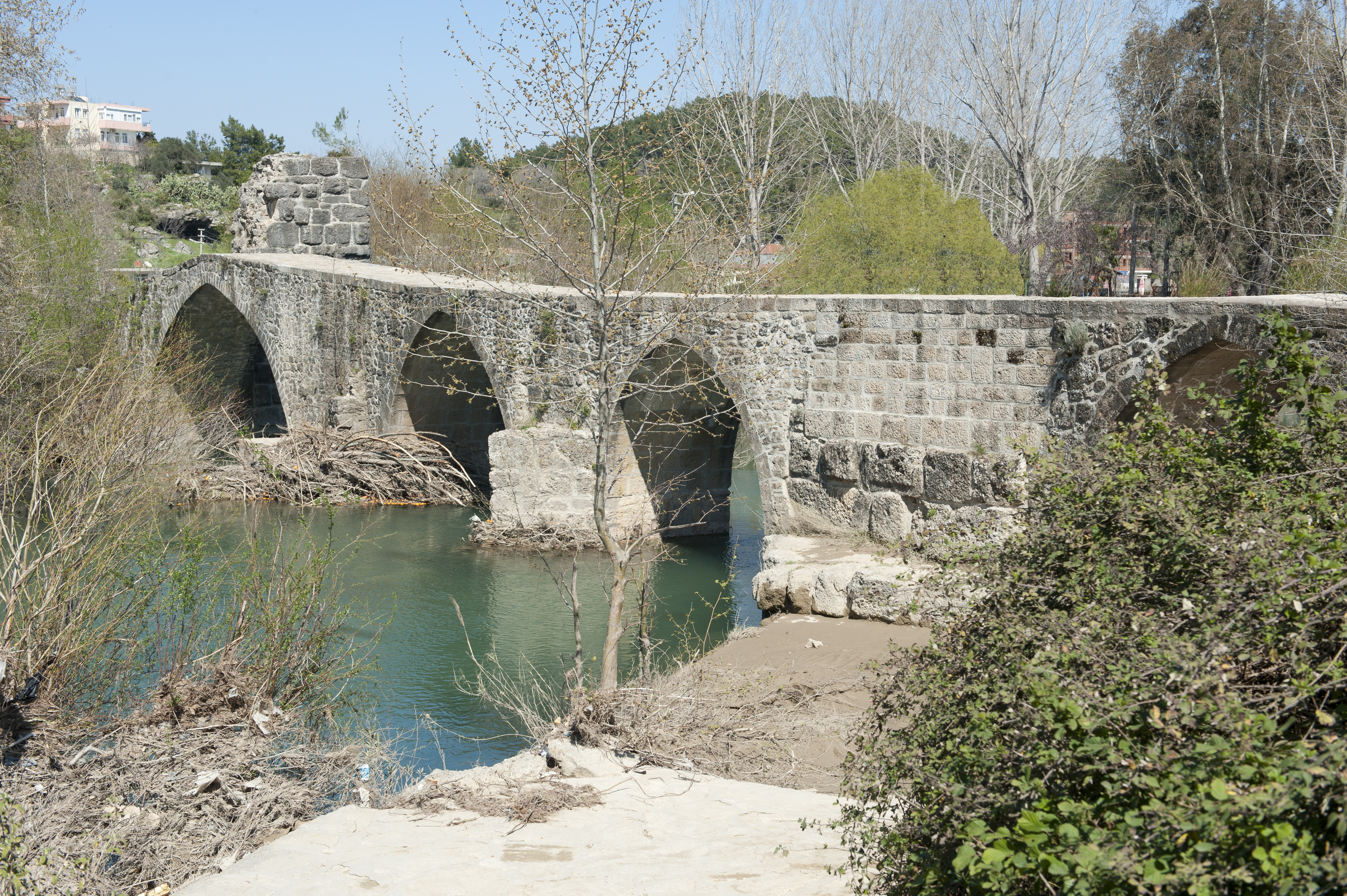
Lyrbe Naras Bridge

Its site is identified with that about 1 km north of modern Bucakşeyhler,

== History ==
Its name is only known by its coins and the mention made of it by Dionysius Periegetes, Ptolemy, and Hierocles. Dionysius places the town in Pisidia, while William Smith equates Lyrbe with the Lyrope (Λυρόπη), mentioned by Ptolemy and placed by the ancient geographer in Cilicia Trachaea.

The Notitiae episcopatuum mention Lyrba as an episcopal see, suffragan of the archbishopric of Side, up to the 12th and 13th centuries. Two of its bishops are known: Caius, who attend the First Council of Constantinople in 381, and Taurianus at the First Council of Ephesus in 431 (Le Quien, Oriens christianus, I, 1009); Zeuxius was not Bishop of Lyrba, as Le Quien states, but of Syedra.

== The Site ==
There are extensive remains of an agora containing a row of two-storey and three-storey building façades, a gate, a mausoleum, a Roman bath, a necropolis, in addition to several temples and churches.

== See also ==
- Seleucia (Pamphylia)
- Extensive series of pictures of the remains of Lyrbe
