= List of Bulgarian architects =

This is a list of notable Bulgarian architects:

== A–M ==
- Victoria Angelova (1902–1947)
- Alexander Georgiev Barov (1931–1999)
- Stancho Belkovski (1891–1962)
- Milka Bliznakov (1927–2010)
- Nikolay Diulgheroff (1901–1982)
- Kolyu Ficheto (1800–1881)
- Georgi Fingov (1874–1944)
- Konstantin Jovanović (1849–1923)
- Nevena Kechedzhieva (1927–2012)
- Nikola Lazarov (1870–1942)
- Yordan Milanov (1867–1932)

== N–Z ==
- Kamen Petkov (1863–1945)
- Josef Schnitter (1852–1914)
- Naum Torbov (1880–1952)
- Milenko Velev
- Ivan Vasilyov (1893–1979)

== See also ==
- List of architects
- List of Bulgarians
