= List of cathedrals in Bulgaria =

This is the list of cathedrals in Bulgaria sorted by denomination.

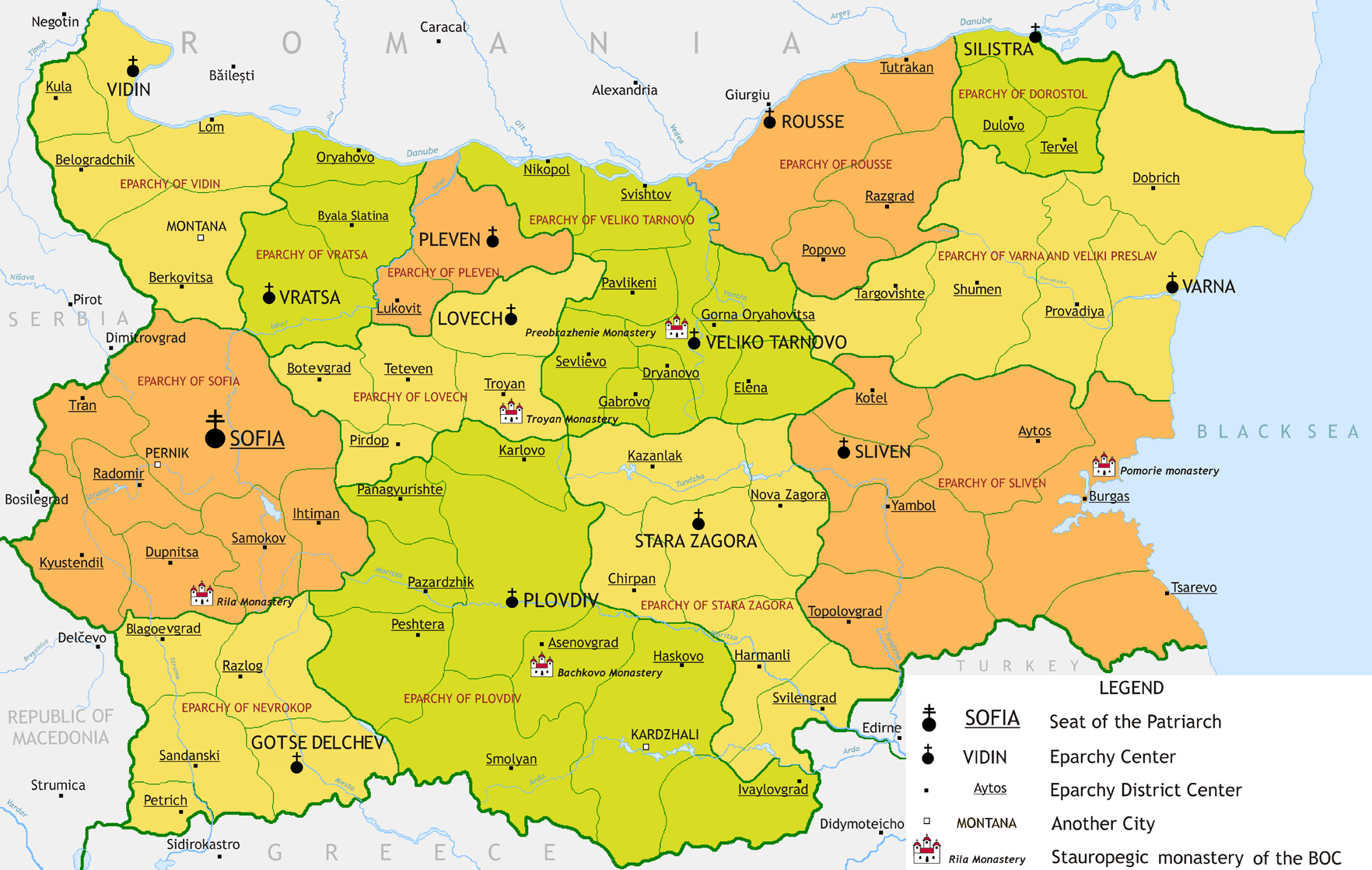
Eparchies of the Bulgarian Orthodox Church in Bulgaria

The Bulgarian Orthodox Church has 13 dioceses on the territory of Bulgaria. Each diocese has a diocesan center (city or town) in which the cathedral (the church building that houses the seat of the metropolitan) of the respective diocese is located. In addition, the Bulgarian Orthodox Church has a Patriarchal Cathedral - the church building that houses the seat of the Patriarch (the head of the Bulgarian Orthodox Church). The Patriarchal Cathedral plays the role of a national cathedral. Thus, the total number of cathedrals of the Bulgarian Orthodox Church on the territory of Bulgaria is 14 (13 metropolitan cathedrals - one for each diocese, plus the patriarchal cathedral).

== Eastern Orthodox ==
The following cathedrals of the Bulgarian Orthodox Church are located in Bulgaria:

№	Name	Image	Built	Location	Affiliation	Notes
1	Saint Alexander Nevsky Cathedral		1882 - 1912	Sofia	National Cathedral	The largest Eastern Orthodox cathedral in the Balkans and one of the largest in the world.
2	Cathedral of St. Demetrius		ca 1640 (the old building of the cathedral - demolished in 1889) / 1889-1900 (the current church building of the cathedral)	Vidin	Eparchy of Vidin	The second largest Eastern Orthodox cathedral in the Balkans.The largest Orthodox church building in the Balkans from 1900 to 1912.
3	Cathedral of the Holy Assumption		1880-1943	Varna	Eparchy of Varna and Veliki Preslav	The third largest church building and cathedral in Bulgaria and one of the largest in the Balkans.
4	Saint Nedelya Cathedral		10th century / 1867 / 1927-1933	Sofia	Eparchy of Sofia	The previous church building on the site was destroyed after the communist terrorist act of 1925 - the biggest terrorist act in Europe at the time and the biggest in the history of Bulgaria.
5	Holy Apostles Cathedral		1898	Vratsa	Eparchy of Vratsa	
6	Cathedral of Sts. Cyril and Methodius		2005-2017	Lovech	Eparchy of Lovech	The newest cathedral building in Bulgaria.
7	Cathedral of the Most Holy Nativity of the Theotokos		1844	Veliko Tarnovo	Eparchy of Veliko Tarnovo	
8	Metropolitan Cathedral of Sts. Peter and Paul		1860	Silistra	Eparchy of Dorostol	
9	Cathedral of St. Demetrius		1831	Sliven	Eparchy of Sliven	
10	Cathedral of St. Demetrius		1859-1861	Stara Zagora	Eparchy of Stara Zagora	
11	Cathedral of the Dormition of the Holy Mother of God		9th century / 1844 -1852	Plovdiv	Eparchy of Plovdiv	
12	Cathedral of Sts. Cyril and Methodius and St Elijah		1904 -1914	Gotse Delchev	Eparchy of Nevrokop	
13	Cathedral of the Holy Trinity		1632	Ruse	Eparchy of Ruse	
14	Cathedral of the Holy Trinity		1893 - 1912	Pleven	Eparchy of Pleven	Cathedral of the newest diocese of the Bulgarian Orthodox Church.

=== Former cathedrals ===
Name	Image	Built	City
Great Basilica		9th century	Pliska
Round Church		10th century	Preslav
Church of St George		10th–11th century	Kyustendil
Patriarchal Cathedral of the Holy Ascension of God		11th–12th century	Veliko Tarnovo
Cathedral of St. Marina		1851	Plovdiv
Cathedral of the Holy Trinity		1868	Lovech

=== Church buildings in administrative centers that are not diocesan centers ===
Name	Image	Built	City
Church of Sts. Cyril and Methodius		1897 – 1907	Burgas
Church of the Presentation of the Blessed Virgin Mary		1844	Blagoevgrad

== Catholic ==
=== Latin Rite ===
The following are Latin Rite cathedrals and co-cathedrals of the Catholic Church in Bulgaria:

Name	Image	Built	City
Cathedral of St. Paul of the Cross		1892	Ruse
Cathedral of St. Louis of France		1858 – 1861	Plovdiv
Cathedral of Christ the Saviour		2007-2020	Vidin
Co-Cathedral of St. Joseph		2006	Sofia

=== Eastern Rites ===
This cathedral belongs to the Bulgarian Greek Catholic Church:

Name	Image	Built	City
Cathedral of the Dormition of the Blessed Virgin Mary		1922 - 1924	Sofia

== See also ==
- Lists of cathedrals by country
- Orthodoxy in Bulgaria
