= Ivan Vasilyov =

Bulgarian architect

- Born: 28 February 1893; Oryahovo, Bulgaria
- Died: 6 April 1979 (aged 86); Sofia, Bulgaria
- Occupation: Architect
- Projects: Sofia University Library; St Nedelya Church, Sofia; SS. Cyril and Methodius National Library; Bulgarian National Bank headquarters Ministry of Defence (Bulgaria)

Ivan Vasilyov (Bulgarian: Иван Васильов) was a Bulgarian architect, born in 1893, deceased in 1979.

Together with Dimitar Tsolov, they established one of the most successful Bulgarian architectural studios called Vasilyov-Tsolov. Many of the landmarks of Sofia are their works, most notably SS. Cyril and Methodius National Library (1940–1953), St Nedelya Church, Sofia (1929), Sofia University Library (1932), Bulgarian National Bank headquarters (1939) and The Ministry of Defence headquarters (1939–1945).

In 2010, in their honor, a commemorative plaque was affixed to the National Library.

== Biography and career ==
SS. Cyril and Methodius National Library

Born as Ivan Tsokov Vasilyov on 28 February 1893 in the town of Oryahovo, Bulgaria. In 1911, after completing high school in Sofia, he went to Munich to study painting. In 1914, Vasilyov started his education in architecture in the Karlsruhe Institute of Technology where he graduated in 1919. After returning to Bulgaria, he worked in collaboration with Stancho Belkovski on the design of Vlado Georgiev house, nowadays the Austrian Embassy. In 1925, Ivan Vasilyov started a long time cooperation with Dimitar Tsolov with whom he created one of the finest examples in the Bulgarian architecture of that era.

== Works ==
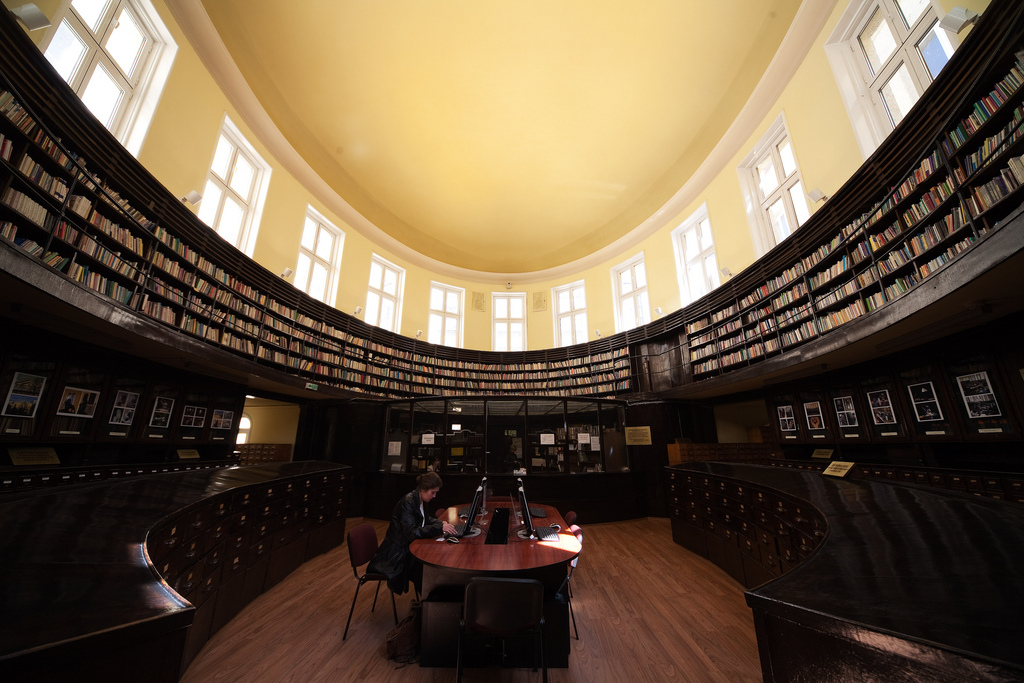
Sofia university library (interior)

=== Vasilyov-Tsolov ===
- 1926 - Banya Palace, Banya village, Karlovo Municipality
- 1927 - The theatre of the army, Sofia
- 1928 - Crafts Bank (nowadays DSK bank), Sofia
- 1929 - St Nedelya Church, Sofia
- 1932 - Sofia University Library
- 1935 - Sofia municipality hall
- 1935-37 - Cultural center in Vratsa
- 1939 - Bulgarian National Bank headquarters
- 1939-45 - The Ministry of Defence headquarters, Sofia
- 1940-53 - SS. Cyril and Methodius National Library, Sofia
- Apartment buildings on “Vasil Levski” boulevard and “Tsar Osvoboditel” boulevard.

=== Other ===
- 1923 - Vlado Georgiev house, nowadays the Austrian Embassy, Gladston str. 16, Sofia, (collaboration with Stancho Belkovski)
- Andrey Nikolov house, nowadays a Cultural center called “The Red House”, Lyuben Karavelov str. 15, Sofia
- D.A.Tsenov Academy of Economics, Svishtov

== See also ==
- List of Bulgarian architects
