= Ivancho Hadzhipenchovich =

Bulgarian politician (1822 - 1894)

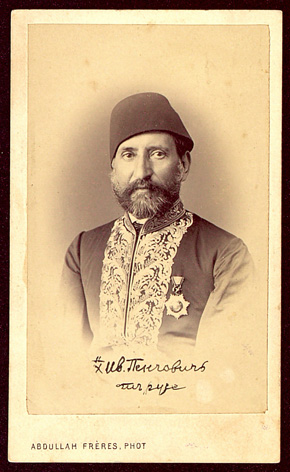
Ivancho Hadzhipenchovich; photograph by Abdullah Frères

Ivancho Velichkov Hadzhipenchovich (Bulgarian: Иванчо Величков Хаджипенчович; 1822, Ruse - 25 March 1894, Sofia) was an Ottoman and Bulgarian statesman. Among the many offices he held, he is perhaps best remembered for his membership on the Commission of Inquiry that gave the death sentence to Vasil Levski.

== Biography ==
His father, Veliko, was a merchant and a member of the City Council (Majlis) for over forty years. From 1841 to 1845, he studied law in Paris. Upon returning to Ruse, he married Anastasia Mavridi, the niece of Nikola Pikolo, an eminent scholar of Greek ancestry. He soon took his place as a merchant, forming partnerships with several Bulgarian and Austrian companies. He also became a member of the local Majlis and, in 1854, was elevated to the rank of Kapujibashi (Chamberlain). In 1864, he became one of the three Bulgarian advisors to the reformer, Midhat Pasha, during his early years as Governor of Danube Vilayet. Two years later, he was elected to the first Provincial Council.

During this time, he was also a generous donor to local church and educational institutions. serving as a trustee for the school at Holy Trinity Cathedral. Later, he helped organize a fundraiser for the Bulgarian St. Stephen Church. He became a patron of the artist Nikolai Pavlovich, from nearby Svishtov, by commissioning a series of portraits. In 1857, he supported the publication of A Traveller in the Woods, a long poem by Georgi Sava Rakovski, a leading figure in the Bulgarian National Revival.

In 1868, he was appointed to the Imperial Council of State in Istanbul. In 1872, he wrote a memorandum to the Grand Vizier, Mahmud Nedim Pasha, exposing the existence of a secret Bulgarian revolutionary society and its possible ties to Serbia. From then until 1873, he served on a three-member government commission investigating the Arabakona train robbery, involving the theft of tax revenues from the Royal Treasury, and the activities of the Bulgarian Revolutionary Central Committee. The commission would sentence one of its leaders, Vasil Levski, to death; an act for which he has sometimes been denounced as a traitor. In 1876, he served on another commission, investigating events surrounding the April Uprising. As part of their report, involving atrocities committed by the bashi-bazouk, an irregular military force, he brought the severed hand of a child to Istanbul, documenting what has come to be known as the Batak massacre. His daughter, Efrosina, helped raise funds for its victims.

He was appointed to a third commission, to specifically examine the events of the massacre, but he no longer enjoyed the full trust of the Ottoman authorities, so he was dismissed and he returned home in 1877. Following the Russo-Turkish War and the establishment of the Principality of Bulgaria, a vassal state of the Ottomans, he was elected to the Constituent Assembly and ratified the Tarnovo Constitution. He then moved to Sofia, the new capital, where he became a member of the Supreme Court and the Council of State.

== Sources ==
- Plamen Bozhinov, Цариградските българи между реформите и революцията 1875 – 1877 (The Bulgarians of Constantinople Between the Reforms and the Revolution), Academic Publishing House, 2012 ISBN 978-954-322-508-8
- Pyotr, Nikov, Възраждане на българския народ. Църковно-национални борби и постижения (Revival of the Bulgarian people. Church-national Struggles and Achievements), Marin Drinov, 2008 ISBN 978-954-322-304-6
- Milena Tafrova, Танзиматът, вилаетската реформа и българите. Администрацията на Дунавския вилает (Tanzimat, Vilayet Reform and the Bulgarians. The Administration of the Danube Vilayet), Tutenberg, 2010 ISBN 978-954-617-099-6
- Krumka Sharova, БРЦК и Процесът след Арабаконашкото нападение 1872 – 1873 (BRCC and the Trial After the Arabakon Attack), Tutenberg, 2007 ISBN 978-954-617-021-7
