= SS. Cyril and Methodius National Library =

National library of Bulgaria in Sofia

Coordinates: 42°41′41″N 23°20′10″E

- Национална библиотека „Свети Свети Кирил и Методий“
- A front view of the library building designed by Vasilyov-Tsolov
- Location: Sofia, Bulgaria
- Type: National Library
- Established: April 4, 1878 (148 years ago)

Collection
- Size: 8,500,000 (As of 2024)
- Legal deposit: Yes

Other information
- Website: www.nationallibrary.bg

The SS. Cyril and Methodius National Library (Bulgarian: Национална библиотека „Свети Свети Кирил и Методий“, romanized: Natsionalna biblioteka "Sveti Sveti Kiril i Metodiy") is the national library of Bulgaria, situated in the capital city of Sofia. Founded on 4 April 1878, the library received the status of Bulgarian National Library three years later and the Bulgarian National Revival Archive was merged into it in 1924.

It is named after "SS. Cyril and Methodius"; Saints Cyril and Methodius. They are the creators of the Glagolitic alphabet. The Cyrillic alphabet is named after Cyril.

The present building of the library is among the landmarks of Sofia. It was designed by the famous Bulgarian architectural team Vasilyov-Dimitur Tsolov and completed in the period 1940–1953.

== History ==
The SS. Cyril and Methodius National Library is currently the largest public library in Bulgaria and the oldest cultural institution after the country's liberation, and also houses one of the richest Ottoman archival collections.

In 1878, Mikhail Bobotinov, a teacher and secretary of the City Council in Sofia, proposed to establish a public library for the need of cultural and educational development in Sofia. The library was then arranged and open in december 1878 and finally received its own building in 1900. In 1939, a new building began construction, but in 1944 both the new and old building were destroyed during a bombing in Sofia. In 1953, the National Library opens its new building under the name "Vasil Kolarov". It was not until 1963 that the library was renamed from "Vasil Kolarov" to "St. Cyril and Methodius".

== Notable collections ==
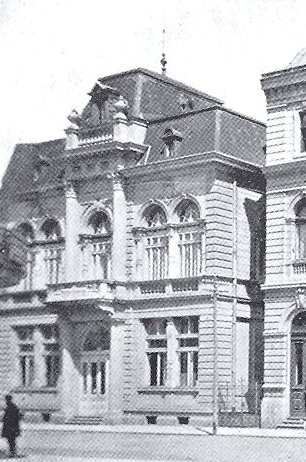
Former building of the library in 1910. It was destroyed in the bombing in 1943–1944.

The main aims of SS. Cyril and Methodius National Library since its establishment was to collect manuscripts, old printed books, and all books in Bulgarian language or by Bulgarian authors written in a foreign language. Later a fund of Slavic and foreign language manuscripts was formed. Among the first entries were the rich personal libraries of the historian Prof. Marin Drinov and the poet Petko Slaveikov, as well as collections from different churches and monasteries. Two collections were formed in the National Library – consisting of Bulgarian and of Oriental documents respectively. Since its very beginning, the institution acquired the character of historical archives.

- Slavonic Scriptures, a collection of more than 1,700 originals dating from the 11th to the 19th centuries.
- Greek and other Foreign Scriptures with around 200 monuments, 9th to 19th century.
- Eastern Scriptures, containing around 3,100 Arabic, 500 Ottoman, and 150 Persian codicies, dated 11th to the 19th centuries.
- Various archives of Ottoman, Arabic, and Persian documents, catalogued under the Collection of Oriental Archives and the Newer Turkish Archives and 328 separate funds, each sorted by geographical criteria, covering a period from the 15th until the first quarter of the 20th century. Both collections contain over 500,000 units, 714 registers (defters) and 168 sidjals.
- Old Print, Rares and Valuables, a collection of about 30,000 volumes in Old Church Slavonic, Bulgarian and foreign languages, covering a period from the 15th until the 20th century, plus a collection of Bulgarian Renaissance press from the period before 1878.
- Old Print Books from the Orient, a collection of around 2,000 volumes in Arabic, Turkish and Persian, covering a period from 1593 to the first quarter of the 20th century.
- Bulgarian Historical Archive with over 1.5 million documents under 700 separate archives covering the work of Bulgarian revolutionaries, economic, cultural and public people from the 18th until the beginning of the 20th century, as well as the history of the independence struggle in Macedonia and Eastern Thrace (see History of Bulgaria).
- Portraits and Photographs, a collection of over 80,000 photographs and illustrations.
