= Bulgarian Historical Archive =

The Bulgarian Historical Archive (Bulgarian: Български исторически архив) functions as part of the SS. Cyril and Methodius National Library and keeps more than 1.5 million documents and a separate collection "Portraits and Photos" consisting of 80,000 photos all of historical importance for Bulgaria and the Balkans.

== History ==
The archive is one of the earliest historical document repositories in Bulgaria. It was established in 1878, just after the Bulgarian Liberation and was then known as the Archives Department of the library. Until the establishment of the State Archive Fund in 1951 it functioned as a national archive.

== Contents ==
The greatest number of documents come from the period middle 19th century to middle 20th century representing the Bulgarian National Revival and post-Liberation period of Bulgarian history. Also covered in great detail are the Bulgarian liberation struggles in Macedonia and the Odrin region after the Liberation.

Some of the most notable specimens of the archive are:

- the pocket notebook of Vasil Levski
- the pocket notebook of Hristo Botev
- a fragment of a parchment with Greek minuscule script from the 11th century, the oldest manuscript in the archive
