= Stancho Belkovski =

Bulgarian architect

- Born: August 11, 1891; Sofia, Bulgaria
- Died: October 10, 1962 (aged 71); Poland
- Occupation: Architect
- Projects: Austrian Embassy, Sofia; Hotel Bulgaria with Concert hall Bulgaria, Sofia; The Physics and Mathematics faculty building, Sofia; The Telephone Palace, Sofia; Aleko mountain hostel

Stancho Belkovski (Bulgarian: Станчо Белковски, 1891–1962), was a Bulgarian architect.

Belkovski is among the prominent names in the history of the Bulgarian architecture from the beginning and the middle of the 20th century. Some of the landmarks of Sofia were designed by him or with his participation most notably the complex “Bulgaria” at the city centre with a hotel, restaurant and a concert hall. He was the first elected rector (1944–45) of the newly founded Higher Technical School in Sofia which is the predecessor of the University of Architecture, Civil Engineering and Geodesy.

== Biography and career ==
Belkovski was born as Stancho Iliev Belkovski on August 11, 1891, in the Bulgarian capital city of Sofia. His parents were teachers. He enrolled architecture at the Technische Hochschule in Charlottenburg (now Technische Universität Berlin), Germany, where he graduated in 1920. After the completion of the institute, he returned to Bulgaria and started working in cooperation with the eminent Bulgarian architect Ivan Vasilyov. From 1925 he briefly worked independently. From 1928 to 1939, Belkovski was a partner with Ivan Danchov, with whom he worked on many of his most famous projects.

In 1944-45, Stancho Belkovski was elected for rector of the Higher Technical School, Sofia where he later established the department of public buildings.

Belkovski died in a train crash during a business trip in 1962 near the city of Kraków, Poland.

== Works ==
- 1923 - Vlado Georgiev house, nowadays the Austrian Embassy, Gladston str. 16, Sofia, (collaboration with Ivan Vasilyov)
- 1924 - Alliance française building, Slaveykov square, Sofia
- 1925 - Nikola Mushanov house (destroyed in 2005), Moskovska str. 47, Sofia
- 1930 - The Central Post Hall in Veliko Tarnovo, (collaboration with Ivan Danchov)
- 1931-32 - German school, nowadays the National Academy of Music, Sofia, (collaboration with Ivan Danchov)
- 1931-37 - Hotel Bulgaria with the Concert Hall Bulgaria, Sofia, (collaboration with Ivan Danchov)
- 1932-33 - G. Semerdzhiev house, later the embassy of Vietnam, nowadays the Libyan embassy, Oborishte str. 12, Sofia, (collaboration with Ivan Danchov)
- 1932-33 - Students palace, Narodno Sabrabie square, Sofia, (collaboration with Ivan Danchov)
- 1935-36 - Andzhelo Kuyumdzhiyski house, nowadays the American ambassador residence, Veliko Tarnovo str. 18, Sofia, (collaboration with Ivan Danchov)
- 1935-37 - Hotel Balkan with cinema hall, nowadays Youth theatre Nikolay Binev, Sofia, (collaboration with Ivan Danchov)
- 1936-47 - The Telephone Palace, Gurko street, Sofia
- 1943 - Aleko mountain hostel, Vitosha Mountain
- 1943 - Tintyava mountain hostel, Vitosha Mountain
- 1951 - The Physics and Mathematics faculty building, James Bourchier boulevard, Sofia

== See also ==
- List of Bulgarian architects
