= Yordan Milanov (architect) =

Bulgarian architect

- Born: December 26, 1867; Elena, Bulgaria
- Died: February 8, 1932 (aged 64); Sofia, Bulgaria
- Occupation: Architect
- Projects: Sveti Sedmochislenitsi Church, Sofia; Holy Synod Palace, Sofia; Central Post Hall, Sofia

Yordan Milanov (Bulgarian: Йордан Миланов; 1867–1932) was a Bulgarian architect.

Milanov was one of the leading Bulgarian architects from the late 19th and early 20th centuries. His works are among the most popular landmarks of the city centar of Sofia, most notably St. Sedmochislenitsi Church and the Synodal Palace which were both designed in cooperation with Petko Momchilov.

== Biography and career ==
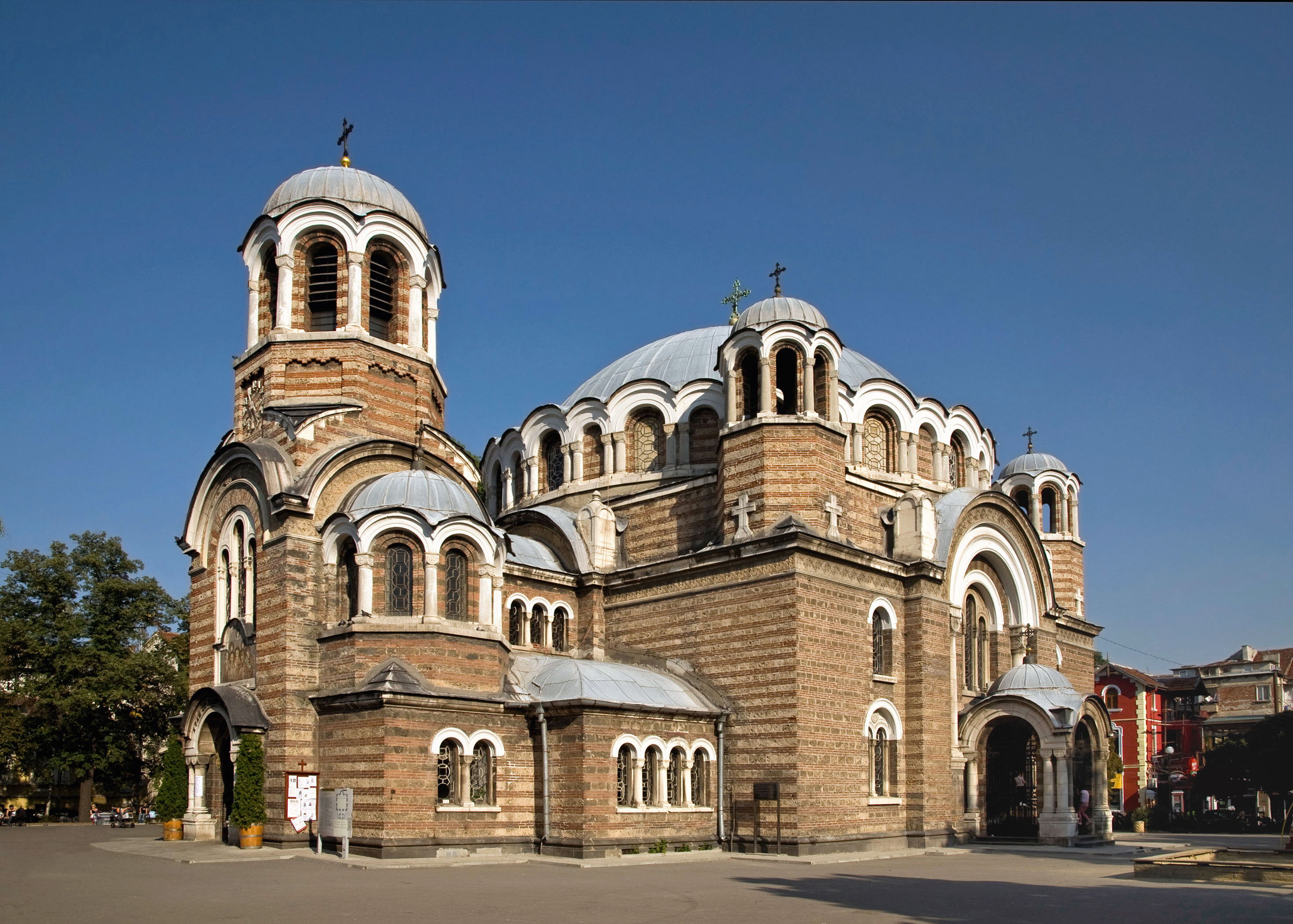
The Sveti Sedmochislenitsi Church

Born as Yordan Milanov on December 26, 1867, in the town of Elena, Bulgaria, he graduated at the famous Aprilov National High School in Gabrovo. In the end of the 1880s, Milanov enrolled architecture at Vienna University of Technology. Returning to Bulgaria in 1893, he began a remarkable career starting as assistant of the chief architect of Sofia municipality and then taking the position of Inspector General at the Ministry of Public Works until 1921. During this time, the collaboration between Milanov and Petko Momchilov created some of the most distinctive and recognizable styles of the Bulgarian architecture from that time.

Milanov was a member and later a chairman of the committee on the construction of the Alexander Nevsky Cathedral in Sofia.

== Works ==
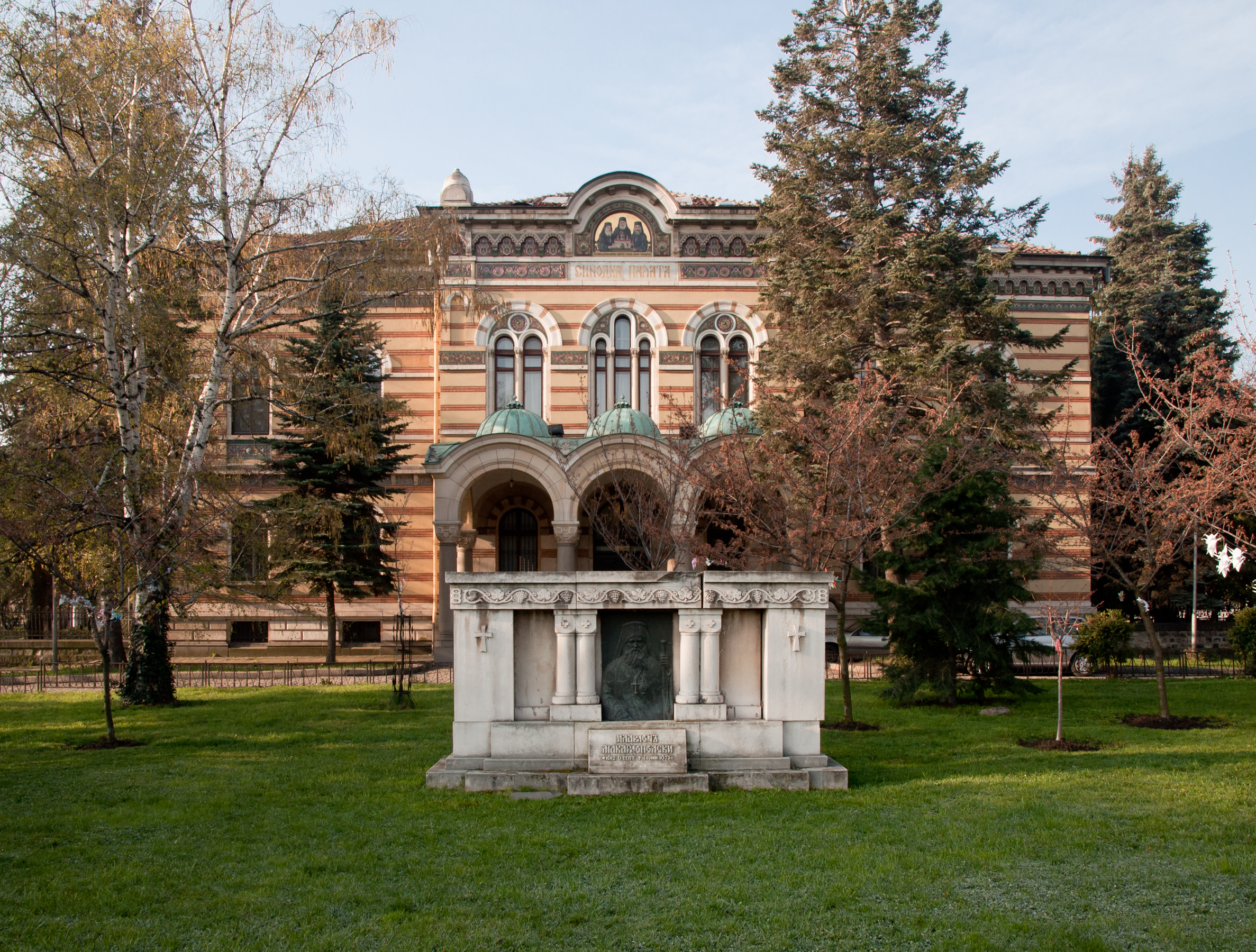
The building of the Holy Synod of the Bulgarian Orthodox Church in Sofia

- Aleksandrovska hospital, Sofia, (collaboration with Petko Momchilov)
- 1893 - Central Post Hall, Sofia
- 1901-1902 - St. Sedmochislenitsi Church, Sofia, (collaboration with Petko Momchilov)
- 1904-1907 - Bulgarian Agricultural Bank headquarters (nowadays Bulgarian State Railways headquarters), Sofia
- 1908 - The Holy Synod Palace, Sofia, (collaboration with Petko Momchilov)
- Redesigning parts of Sofia University Rectorate

== See also ==
- List of Bulgarian architects
