= Banya Palace =

Coordinates: 42°33′8″N 24°50′24″E

- дворец в Баня
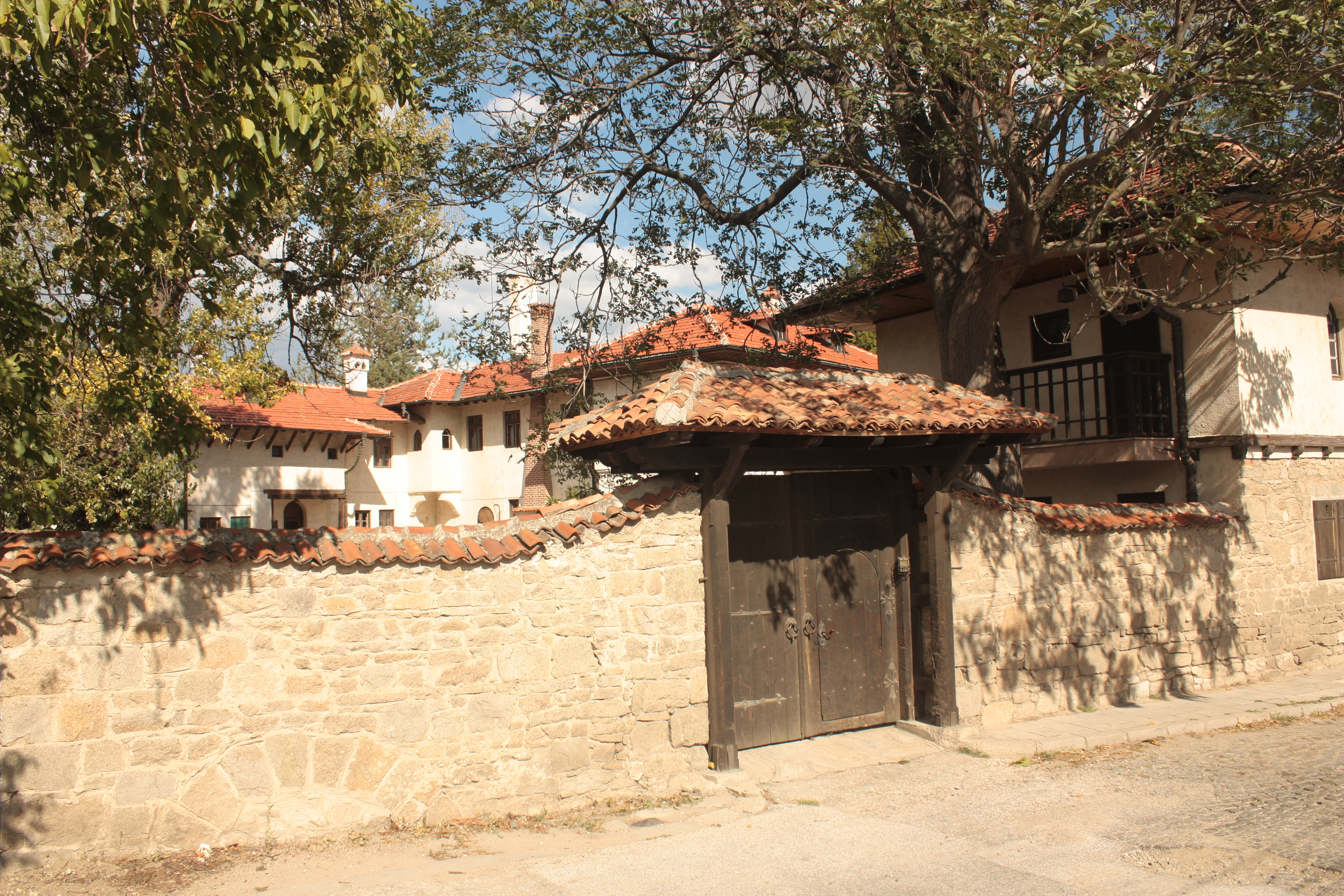
- Interactive map of the Banya Palace area

General information
- Type: Summer villa
- Architectural style: Bulgarian National Revival
- Location: Banya, Bulgaria
- Construction started: 1925
- Construction stopped: 1929
- Owner: Simeon II

Design and construction
- Architect: Ivan Vasilyov

Banya Palace (Bulgarian: дворец в Баня, dvorets v Banya) is a royal summer villa or small palace on the northern outskirts of the town of Banya in Karlovo Municipality, Plovdiv Province, southern Bulgaria. It was commissioned to University of Karlsruhe-educated architect Ivan Vasilyov after Tsar Boris III of Bulgaria visited the town in 1925 and liked the climatic conditions and the curative mineral springs in the area, and finished in 1929.

The white-painted palace's architecture draws heavily from 19th-century Bulgarian National Revival architecture. It features a large veranda covered with Italian terracotta and with five oak columns supporting it, windows with shutters and a high stone wall with two oak gates. Besides the villa, there are two additional buildings for guests and servants.

The villa also has a small park of 7,000 m^{2} and the surrounding lots were also improved. Among the plants that can be seen are the Ginkgo, red oak, sweetgum and others.

In 2000, Banya Palace was reinstated to the deposed Tsar Simeon II, Boris III's eldest son, who had his official residence there for some time. In September 2025, oil business owner Georgi Samuilov purchased the villa for 2.5 million euro as an investment.
