= Nikolai Pavlovich =

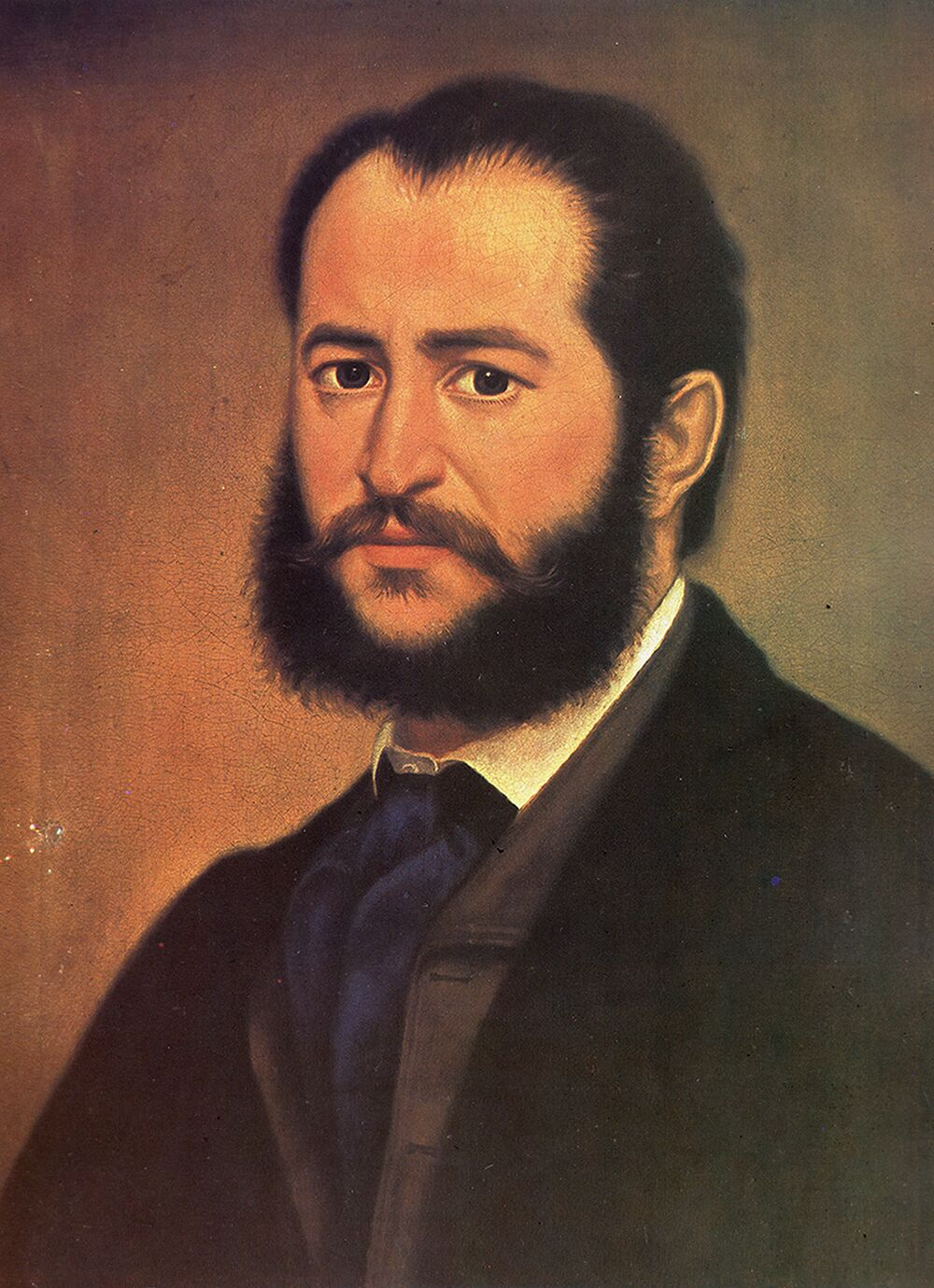
Self-portrait (date unknown)

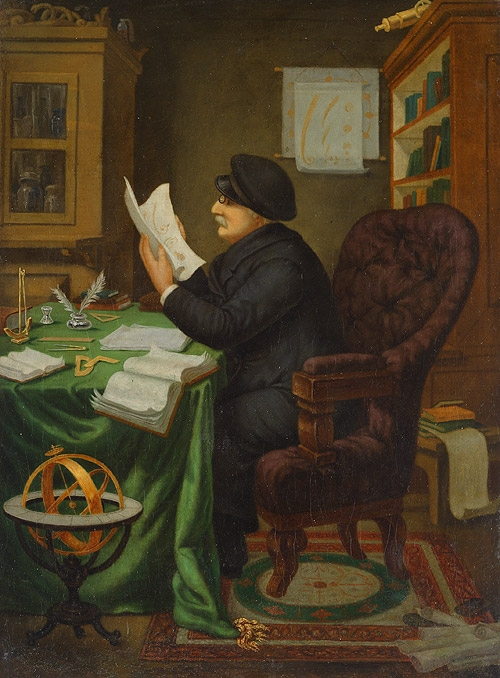
Posthumous portrait of Petar Beron (c.1886)

Nikolai Pavlovich (Bulgarian: Николай Павлович; 9 December 1835, Svishtov – 13 February 1894, Sofia) was a Bulgarian romantic nationalist painter, lithographer and illustrator.

== Biography ==
He was the son of Hristaki Pavlovich, a teacher and writer of the Bulgarian National Revival. His earliest works were illustrations for the Atlas Cosmobiographique and Atlas Meteorlogique; books by Dr. Petar Beron that were later published in Paris. With the money he made from them, he was able to study in Vienna and at the Academy of Fine Arts, Munich, where he graduated in 1858. His meticulous attention to detail, especially in his portraits, soon won him many offers of employment.

After his return to Svishtov, he also tried his hand at lithography, theater set design, home decoration and iconography, which included 73 icons for the Church of the Holy Trinity. He became the first modern-style history painter in Bulgaria, joining his father in promoting the Revival, and continued to do portraits. His best-known sitters included Tsvetan Radoslavov (his nephew), Ivancho Hadzhipenchovich and Nikola Zlatarski.

In the 1860s, he travelled to Belgrade, where he met Georgi Sava Rakovski and illustrated Няколко речи о Асеню първому, a book of patriotic speeches. Despite these numerous revolutionary connections, Pavlovich chose not to participate in the new government after the liberation in 1878.

In 1885, he was a volunteer in the Serbo-Bulgarian War. Four years later, he moved to Sofia, where he became a teacher at the "Софийска класическа гимназия", a high school for boys, remaining there until his death. The National Academy of Art was named after him from 1951 to 1995.
