= Banya, Plovdiv Province =

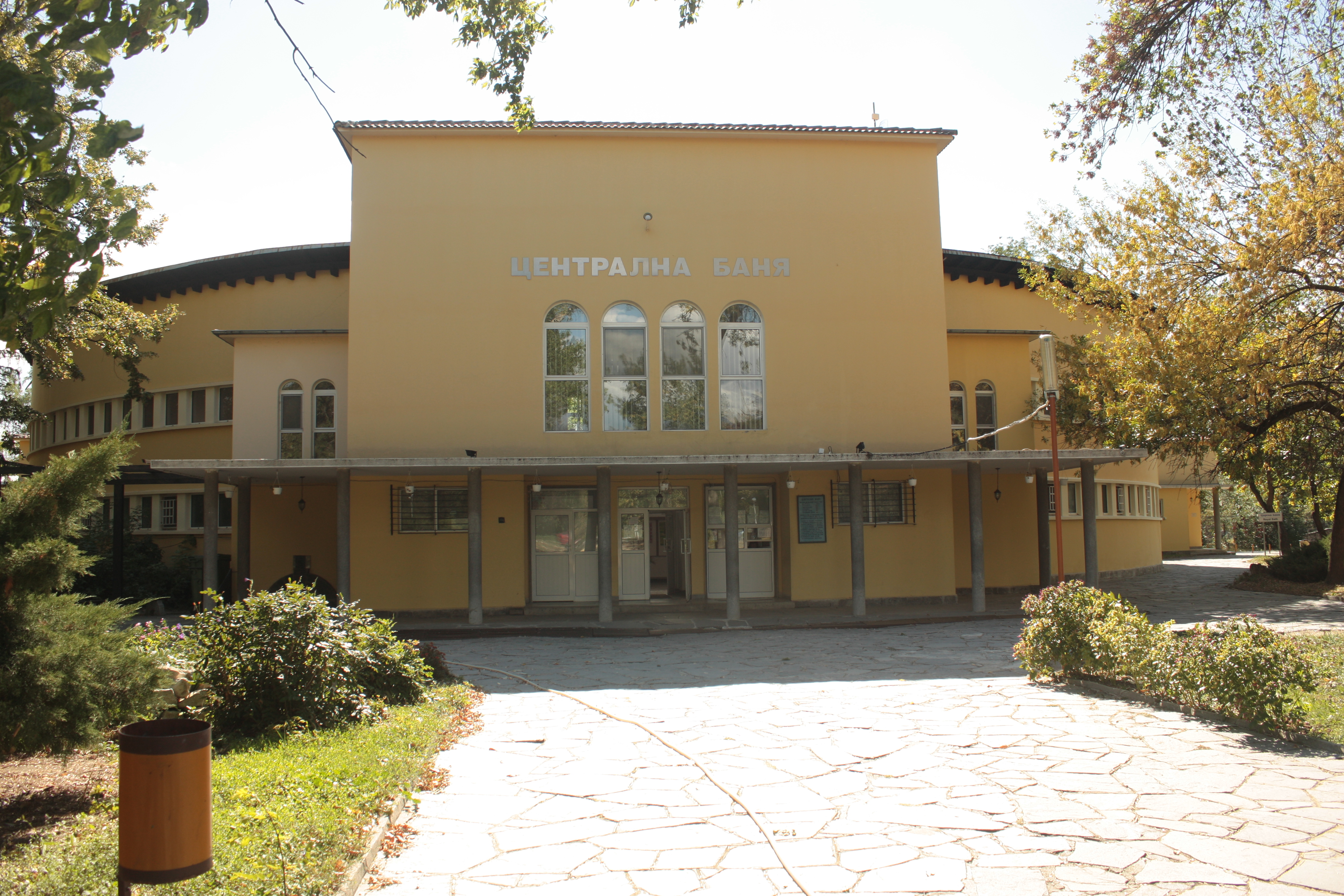

- Location of Banya, Plovdiv Province
- Coordinates: 42°33′N 24°50′E
- Country: Bulgaria
- Province (Oblast): Plovdiv

Government
  - Mayor: Stamen Geshev
- Elevation: 295 m (968 ft)

Population (15.09.2004)
  - Total: 3,968
- Time zone: UTC+2 (EET)
  - Summer (DST): UTC+3 (EEST)
- Postal Code: 4360
- Area code: 03132

Banya (Bulgarian: Баня [ˈbaɲɐ]) is a town in Southern Bulgaria. It is in Karlovo Municipality, Plovdiv Province and is close to the town of Karlovo.

== Spa resorts ==
The health resort village of Banya is in a park at the foothills of the Sredna Gora mountain range, near the geographic centre of the country in the Karlovo Valley, which is part of the wider Rose Valley, between the Balkan Mountains and the Sredna Gora range. It is accessible by multiple modes of transportation. The beaches, swimming pools, sport complexes, balneological hotels and rehabilitation establishments in the town create conditions for summer holidays and tourism. There is a winery named the “Rose Valley”.

== Mineral springs ==
The remains of an ancient village proves that the town was used for hydrotherapy in ancient times. There are nine hydrothermal sources. There are plenty of mineral springs.

== Boris III and his palace ==
The Banya Palace summerhouse of Boris III (r. 1918–1943) with its yard-garden, called by the locals “The Palace,” is in the town of Banya. In 1927 Tsar Boris III took a cure for rheumatism in the country house of the manufacturer I. Bagarov. Pleased at his stay, he decided to build up an estat. It was in a courtyard with luxurious verdure and was finished in 1929.

== Transport ==
- By airplane: Banya is 155 km from Sofia, 50 km from Plovdiv, 10 km from Karlovo, Hissar and Sopot. You can arrive to Sofia or to Plovdiv/Krumovo airport. Rides from the Sofia Airport to Banya are 50 euro, from Plovdiv Airport to Banya 25 euro.
- By bus: There are many international buses to Plovdiv. From Plovdiv to Banya there are buses on every hour: 7:00, 8:00, 9:00 ... to 20:00 from the bus-station named "юг" (south). The buses are for direction Karlovo. It takes about an hour.
- By train: There are trains from Plovdiv-Banya-Karlovo and back Karlovo-Banya-Plovdiv. Arrive at Plovdiv or Karlovo by bus or train and then take a train to Banya.
