= Holy Trinity Cathedral, Ruse =

Church in Ruse

Holy Trinity Cathedral
- Катедрален храм "Света Троица"
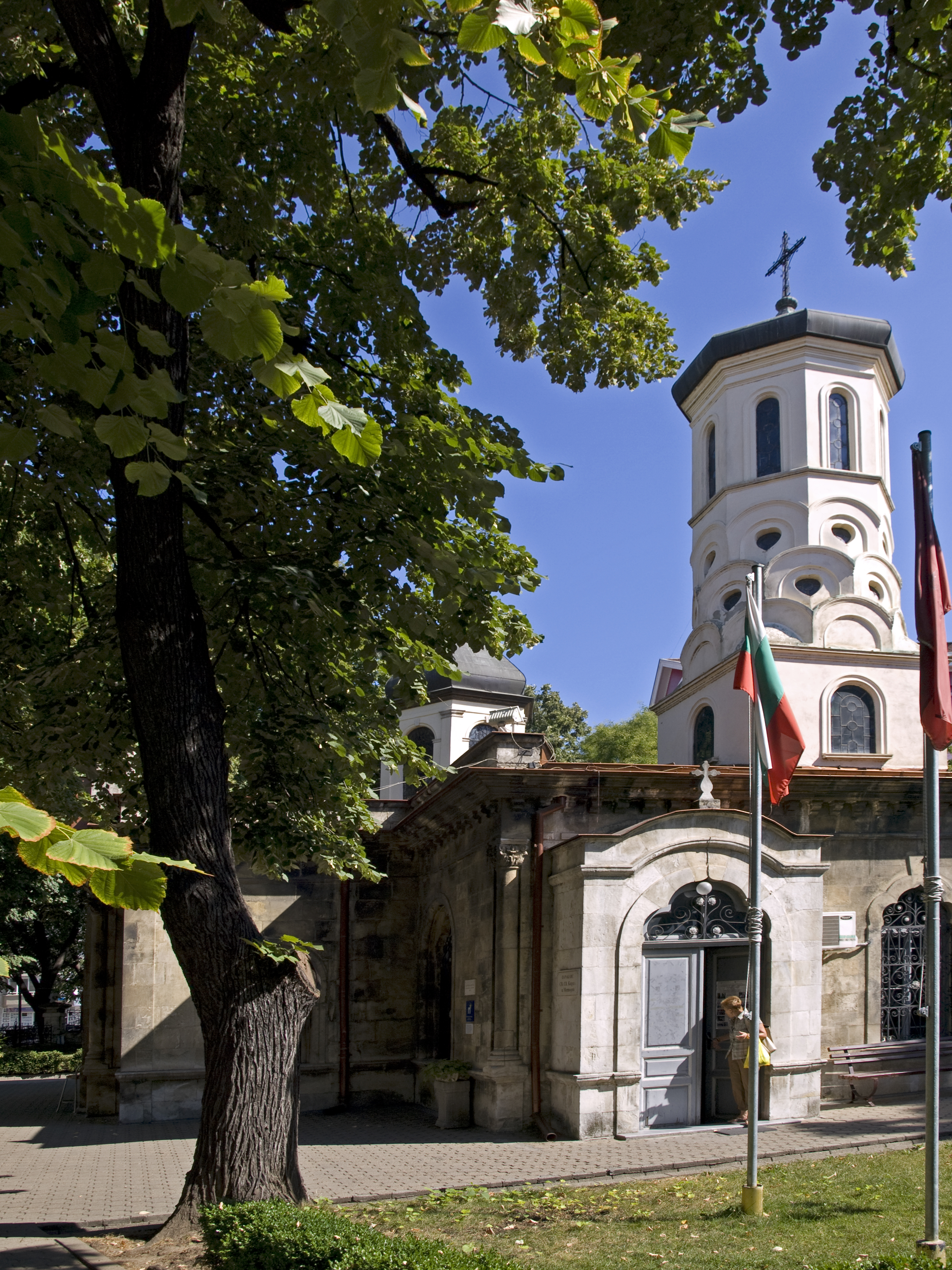

- Location within Bulgaria

Religion
- Affiliation: Bulgarian Orthodox
- Province: Ruse
- Leadership: Neophyte of Bulgaria

Location
- State: Bulgaria
- Interactive map of Holy Trinity Cathedral
- Coordinates: 43.847587°N 25.956666°E

Architecture
- Style: Bulgarian Revivalist architecture
- Completed: 1632

Specifications
- Length: 31.2 m
- Width: 15.6 m
- Height (max): 19.0 m
- Dome: 2

The Holy Trinity Cathedral (Bulgarian: Катедрален храм "Света Троица", Katedralen hram "Sveta Troitsa") is a Bulgarian Orthodox cathedral in the city of Ruse, Bulgaria on the Danube river. It stands next to the modern day opera house. Built beneath the ground in 1632, it is the oldest church in the city and was constructed during the period of Ottoman occupation. As it keeps the holy relics of a number of saints, Ruse's cathedral is often visited by pilgrims. Its rich history and underground interior also pose an interest for tourists, making it one of the main attractions of the city.

As one of the oldest buildings in Ruse, the Holy Trinity Cathedral was declared a cultural monument of national importance in 1983. It is continually cared for and maintained in order to be preserved for generations to come.

== Architecture ==
It is a three-nave pseudo-basilica that is 31.20 m long and 15.60 m wide. Two rows of seven columns separate the naves. It was dug four and a half meters below the level of the yard due to the requirements of Ottoman authorities. The remains of catacombs, possibly dating back to the fifth century, are located in the southwest corner of the temple. During Ottoman rule, it was easier to issue permission for the construction of a new church at the location of an older temple. The Christians of Ruse presumably used the old catacomb to build the church.

The hexagonal belfry is 19 m high and was built with stones from the fortification facilities around the Ruschuk fortress, demolished by decision of the Berlin Congress from July 1878. There are five bells in the belfry. In the cathedral's narthex are the graves of four bishops of the Dorostolo-Cherven diocese: Grigoriy, Valisiy, Mihail, and Sofroniy.

== Design and construction ==
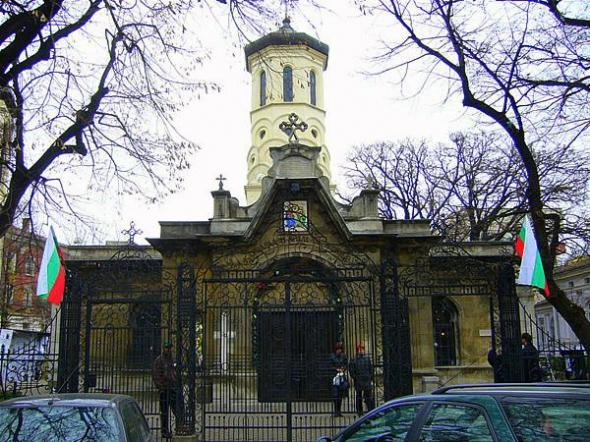
The exterior of the Holy Trinity cathedral.

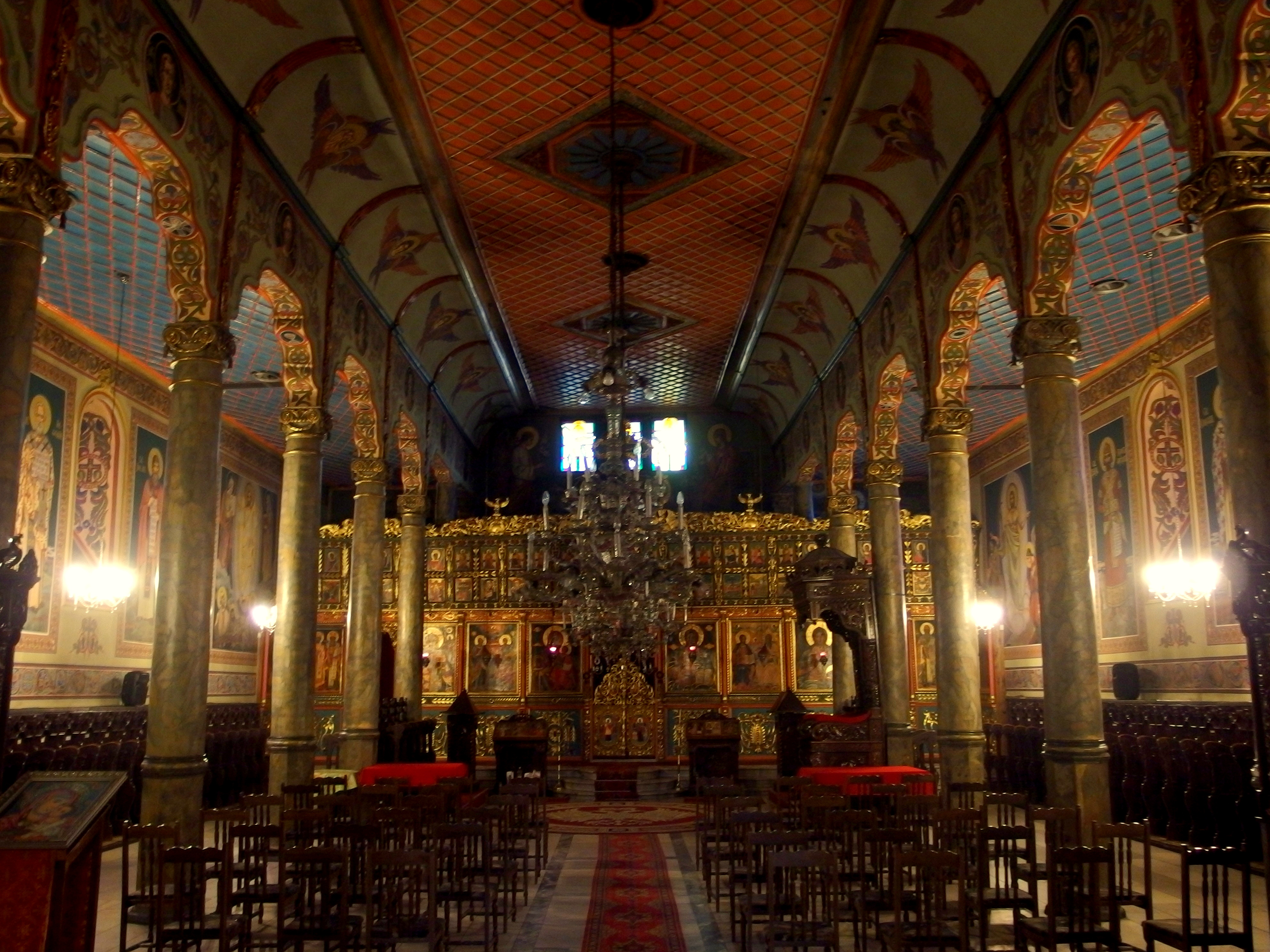
Underground interior of the cathedral.

The origin of the iconostasis has not yet been clarified, it was made in 1805 – 1807, then the icons were painted. During the period 1989 – 2000, a complete restoration of the iconostasis by Irina and Vaclav Yosif Kopetski from Sofia was carried out.

A church choir was created in 1870, based on the idea of the teacher Todor Hadjistanchev. After the beginning of the 20th century, it became the only church choir in Bulgaria on an annual state subsidy.

Two chapels were built with donations after the liberation of Bulgaria, giving the current exterior appearance of the temple. The first chapel is dedicated to Alexander Nevsky and was consecrated on 5 August 1884. It was rebuilt in 1983 and contained a museum exposition for church plates, icons, and old printed books. The second chapel is dedicated to the Holy Brothers Cyril and Methodius. It was consecrated on 16 March 1886 by Metropolitan Gregory Dorostolski and Chervenski.

The wooden stairs from which the temple was entered and separated by a railing were replaced by stairs made of stone. Above them, a beautiful cube in Russian style and a bell tower were constructed. The walls of the temple were painted in 1934 by Prof. Stefan Ivanov and Mr. Zhelyazkov.

== Gallery ==
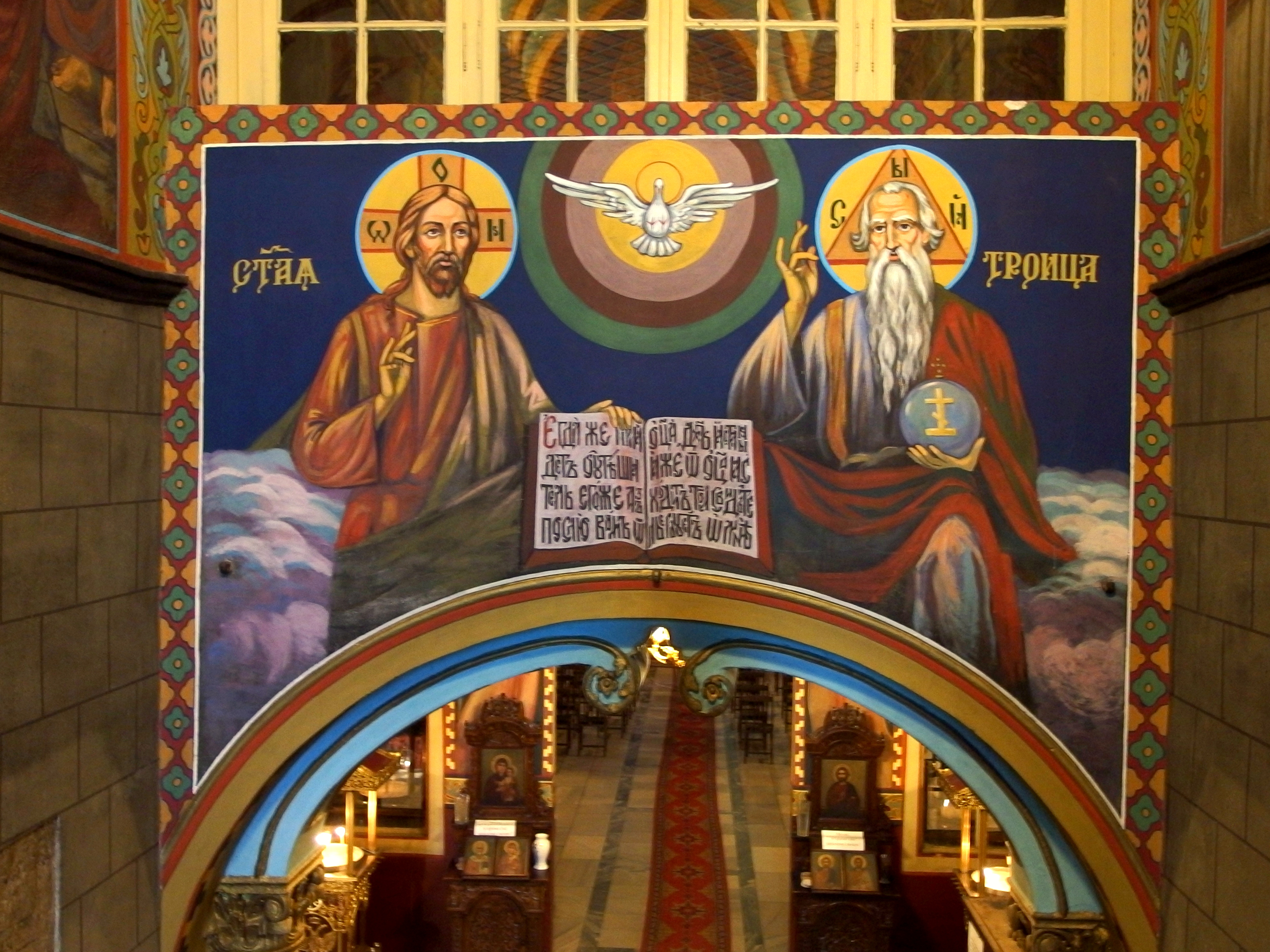

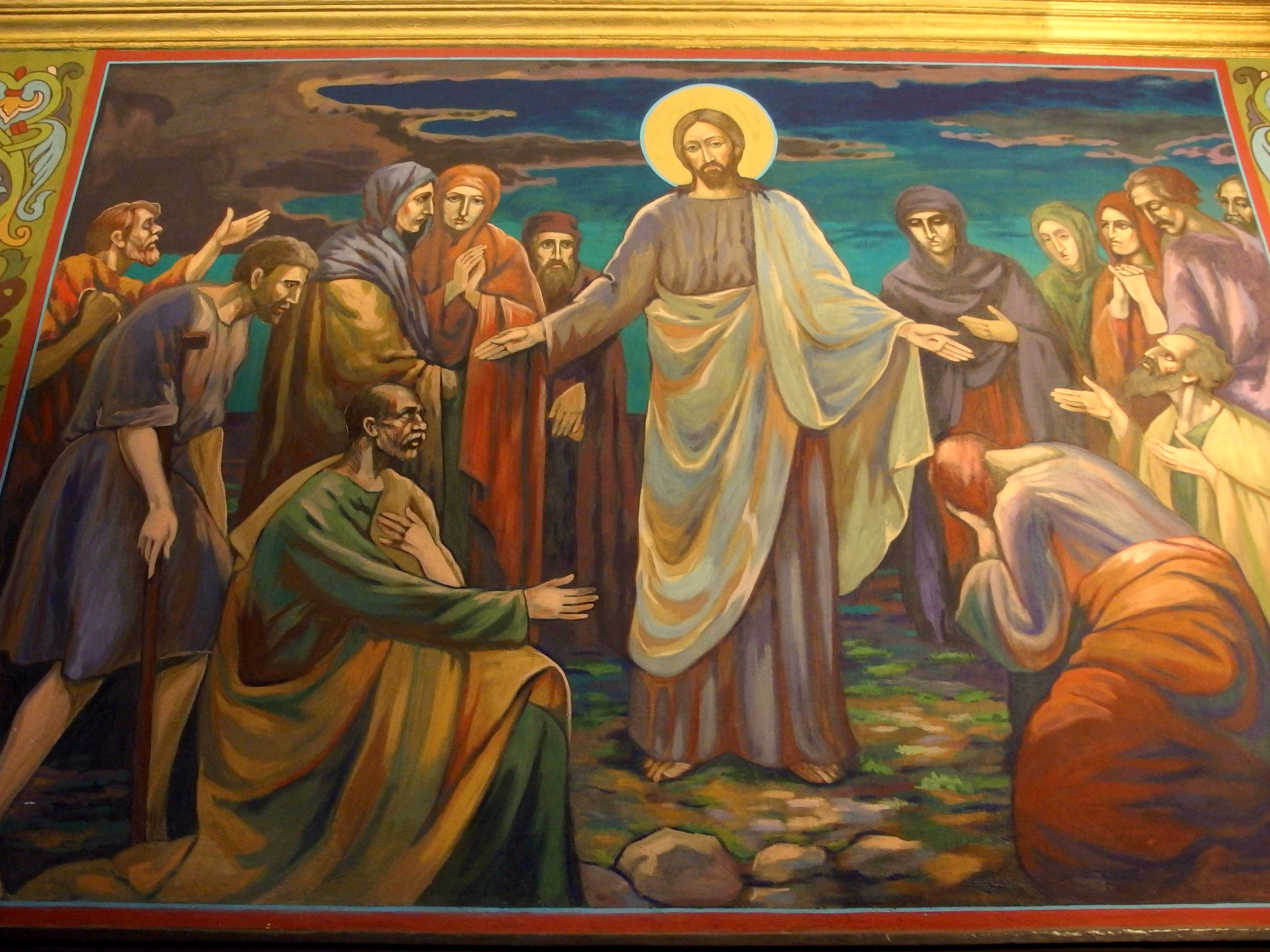

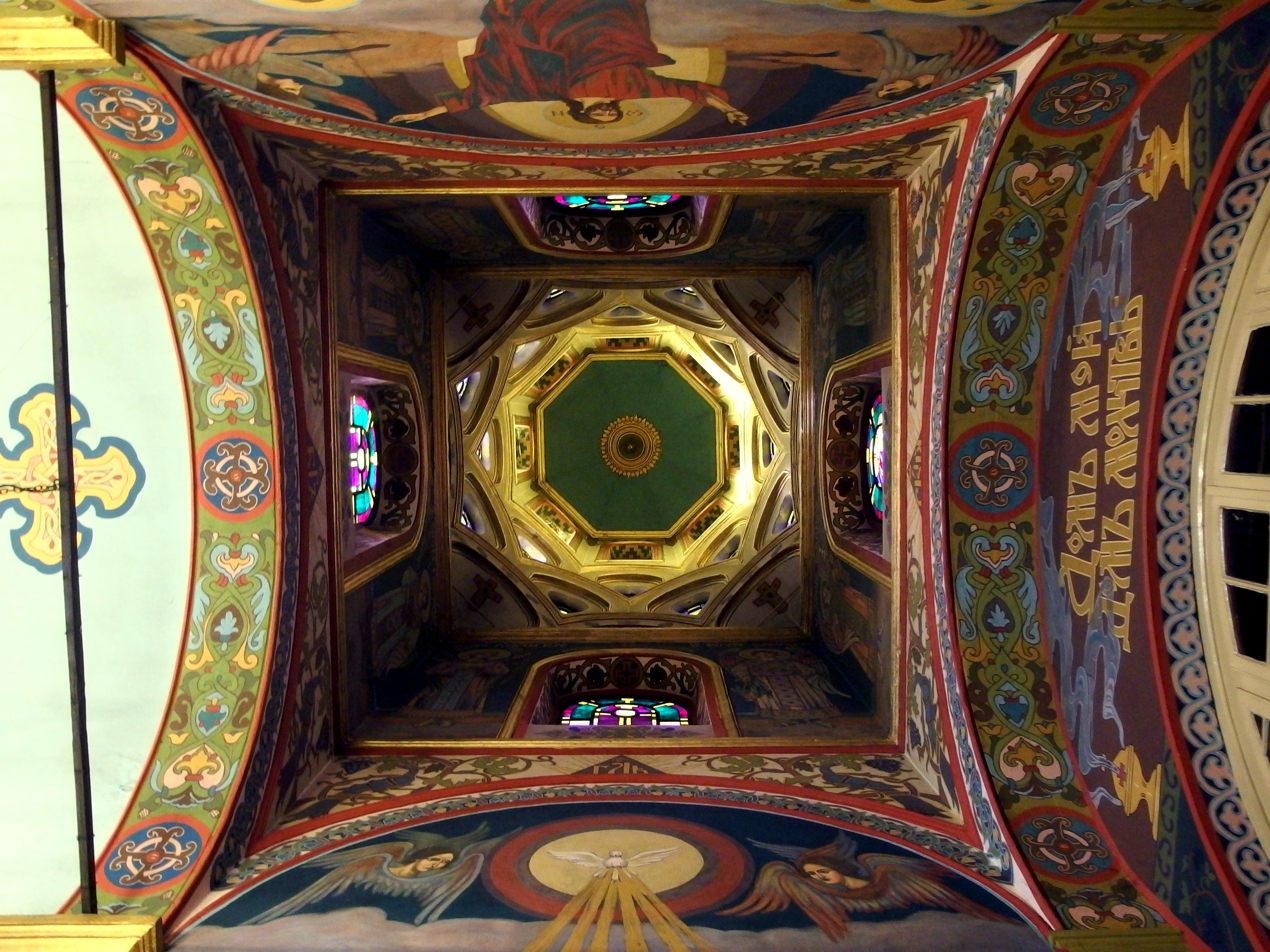

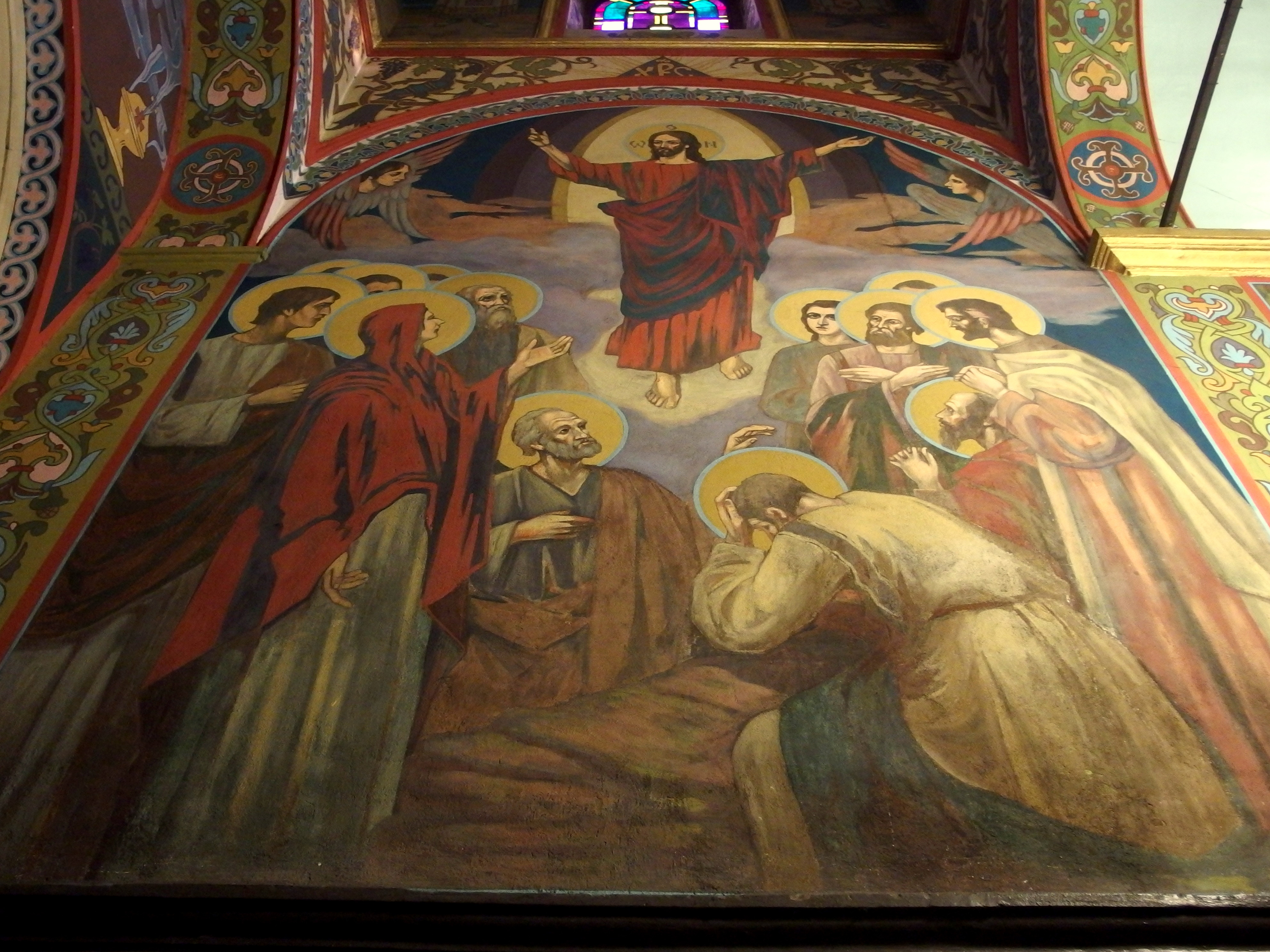

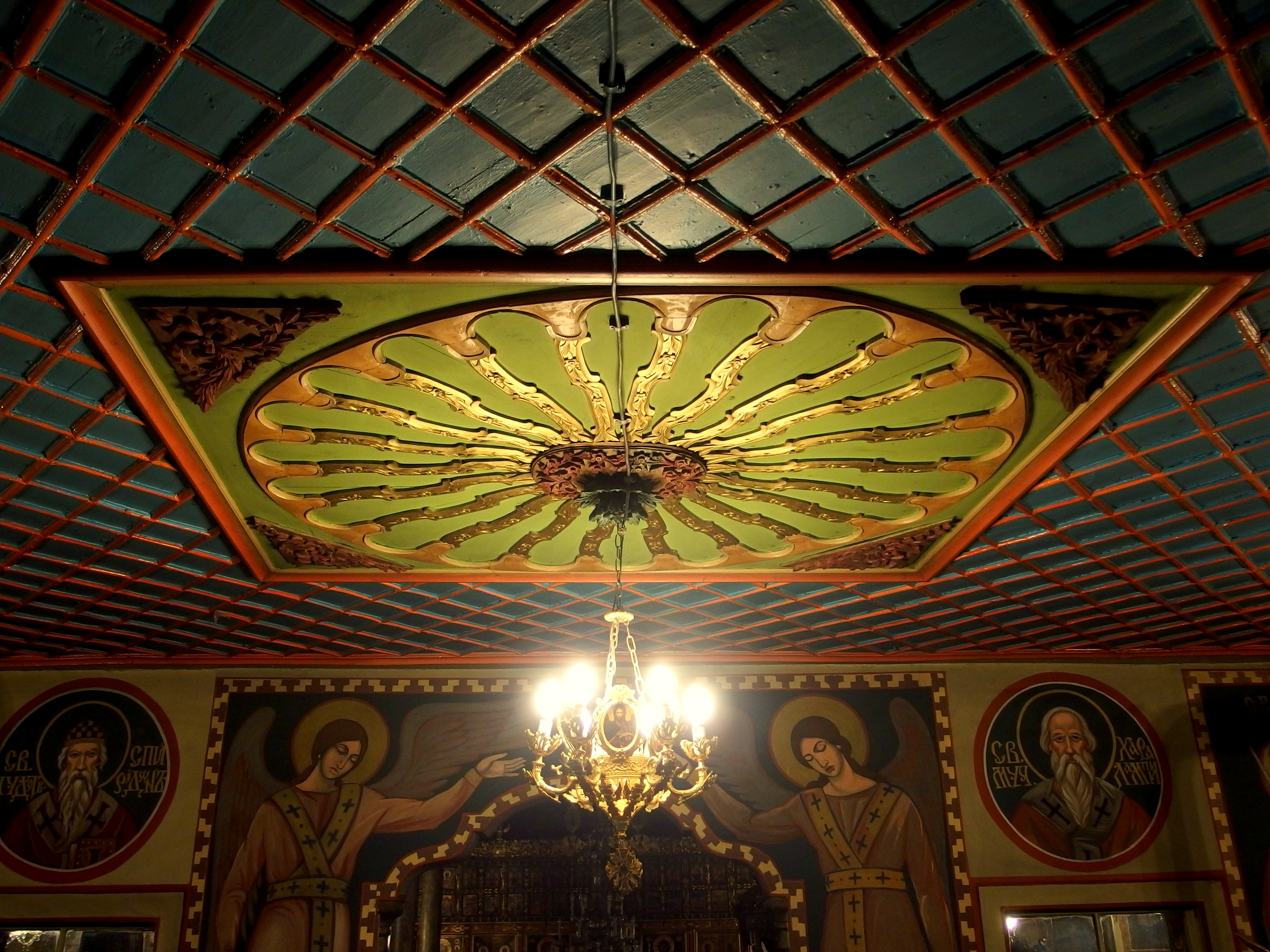

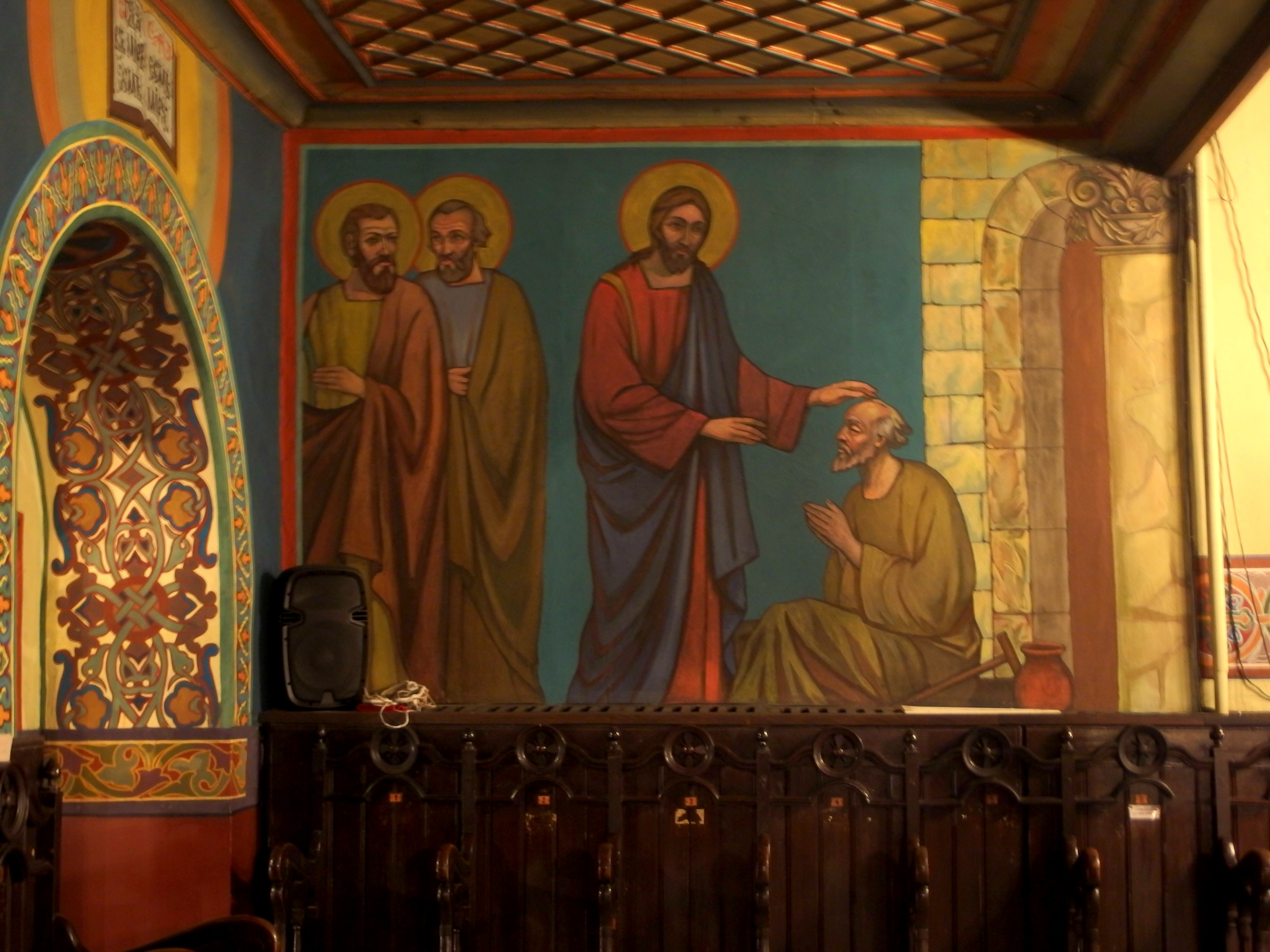

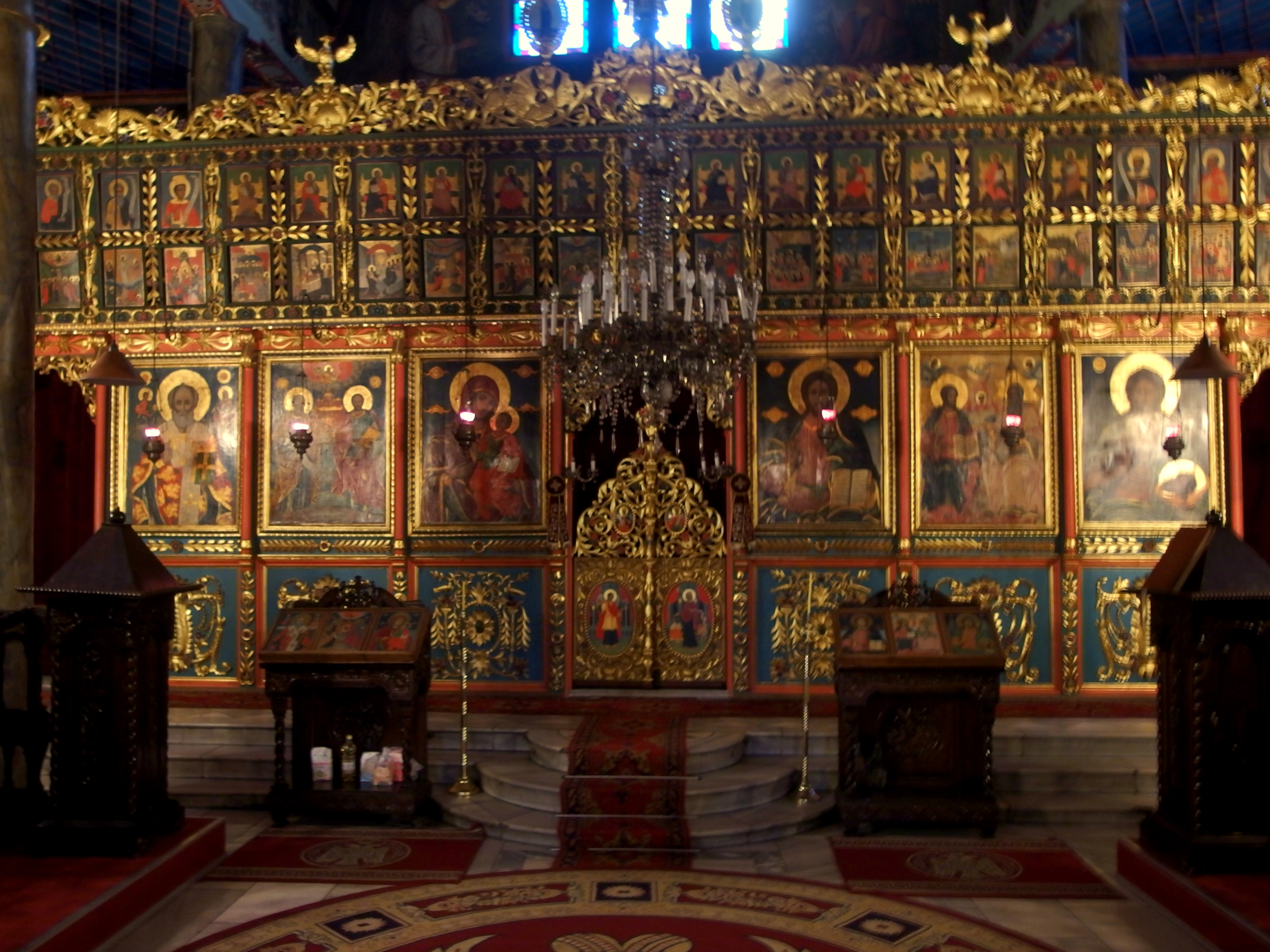

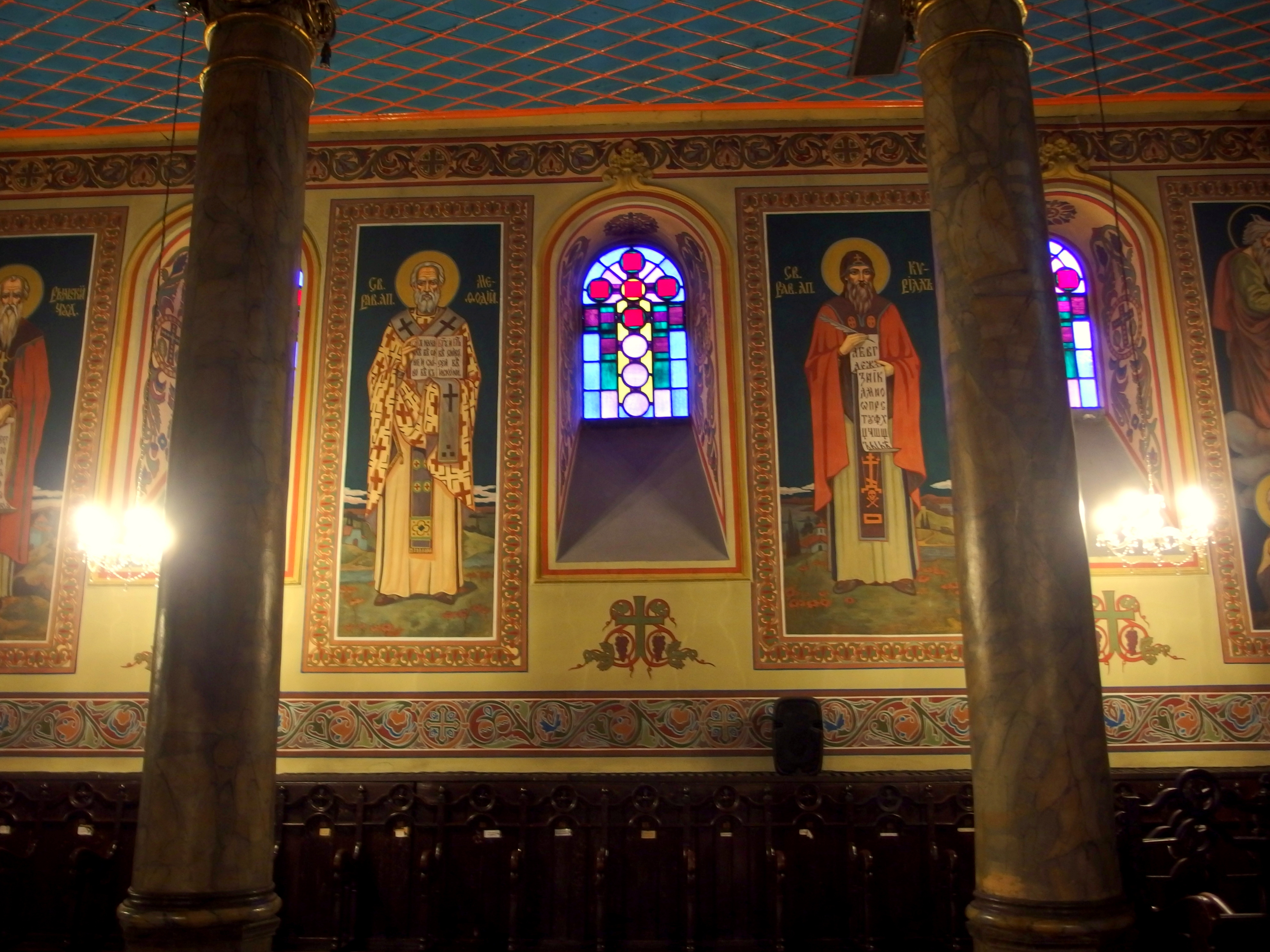

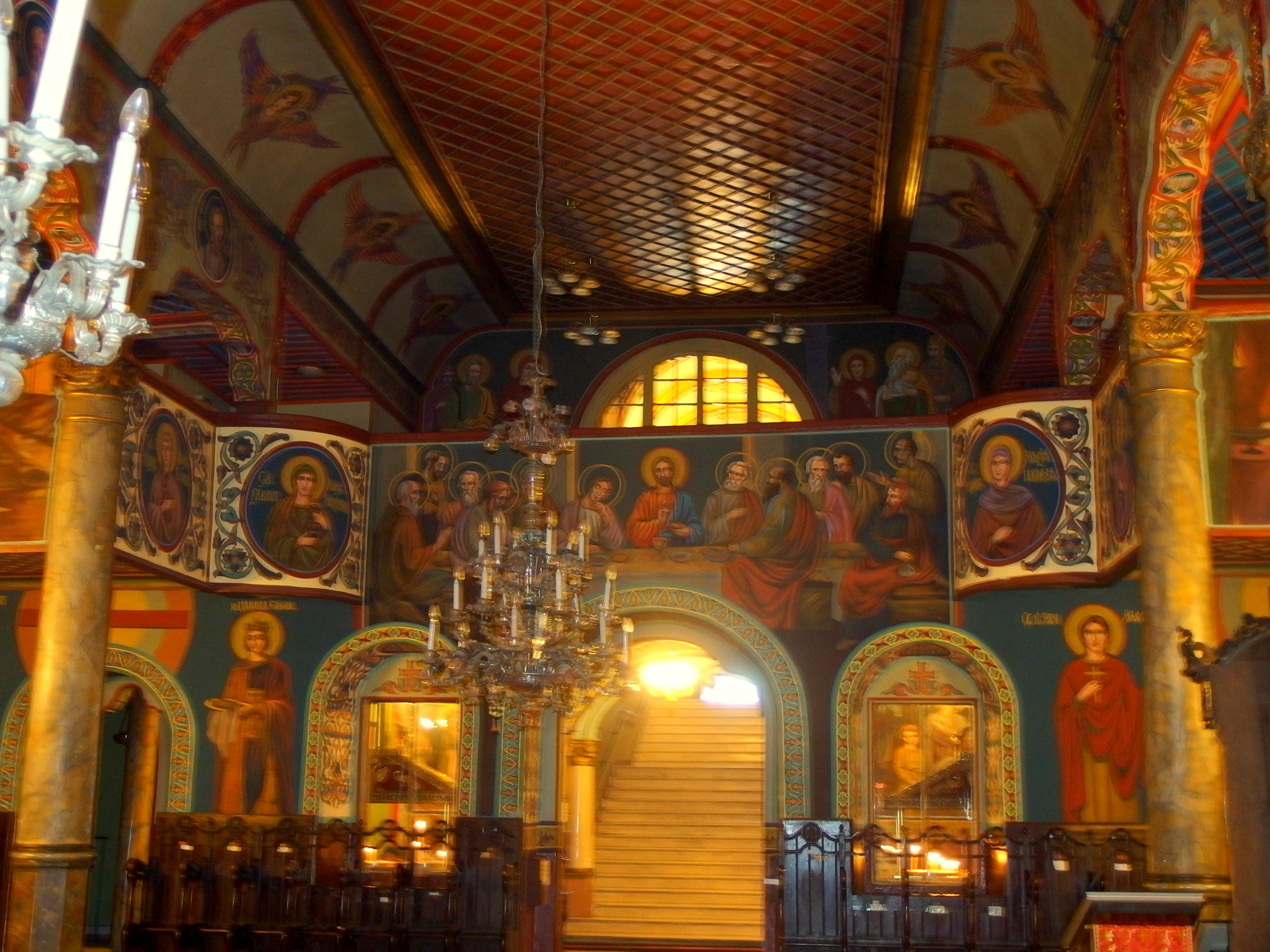

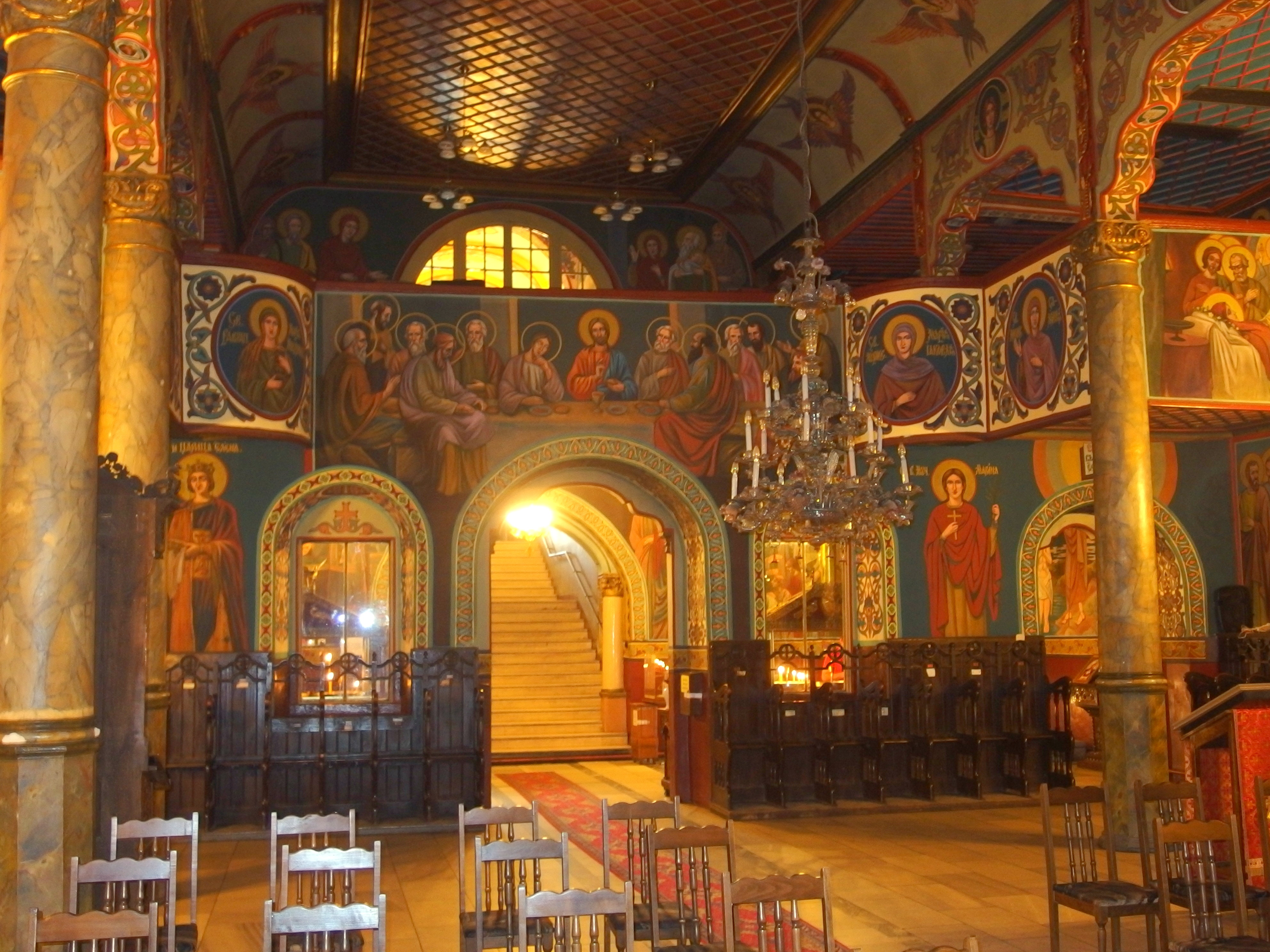

== See also ==
- List of cathedrals in Bulgaria
- Orthodoxy in Bulgaria
- Ruse, Bulgaria
