= Nevena Kechedzhieva =

Bulgarian architect and interior designer (1927–2012)

Nevena Stoianova Kechedzhieva (Невена Кечеджиева; 30 November 1927 – 23 May 2012) was a Bulgarian architect and interior designer. Born in the capital Sofia, she studied at Sofia Polytechnic and graduated in 1951. Upon graduation, she worked for the Bulgarian state design organization Glavproekt until her retirement in 1984. Over the course of her career, Kechedzhieva worked in Cuba, Nigeria, the People's Republic of Yemen and Mozambique.

A collection of Kechedzhieva's architectural drawings from 1971 to 1989 is available as part of the International Archive of Women in Architecture at the Virginia Polytechnic Institute and State University.

Kechedzhieva died on 23 May 2012, at the age of 84.

== Selected list of works ==
- Higher Institute of the Performing Arts in Sofia, Bulgaria.
- Apartment complexes in Dimitrovgrad and Kurdzhali.
- Two hotels, the Hotel Narcissus and Hotel for Balkanturist in Varna,
- A 200-bed hospital in Bulgaria and Nigeria.
- Sunny Coast Resort, Burgas.
