= Saint Nedelya Cathedral, Sofia =

Eastern Orthodox cathedral

Saint Nedelya Cathedral
- Катедрален храм "Св. Неделя"
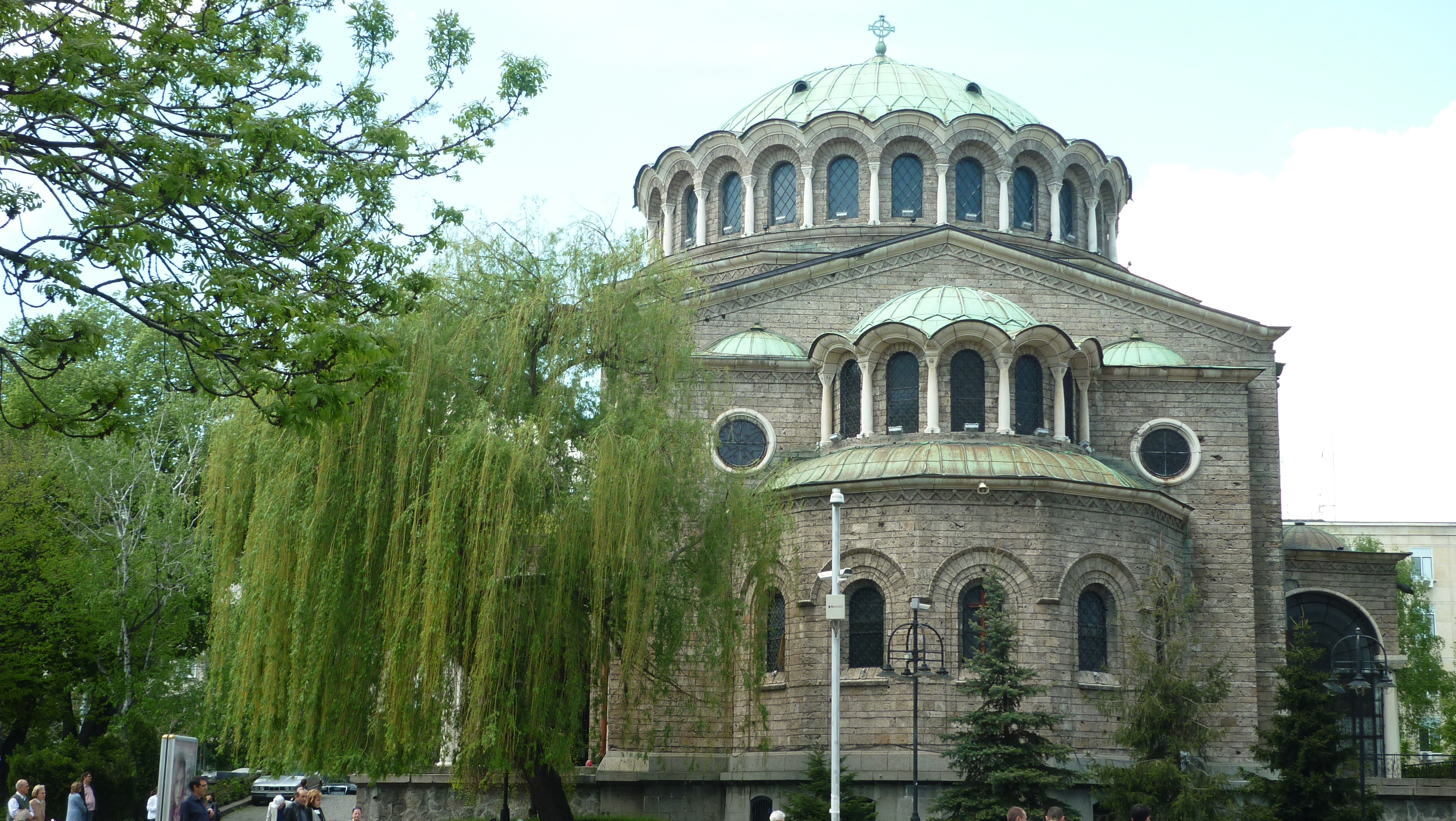

- Location of the cathedral in Sofia
- Saint Nedelya Cathedral
- 42°41′48″N 23°19′17″E
- Location: Sveta Nedelya Square, Sofia
- Country: Bulgaria
- Denomination: Eastern Orthodox
- Tradition: Bulgarian Orthodox Church

History
- Status: Cathedral
- Dedication: Saint Nedelya; Sveta Nedelya
- Earlier dedication: 10th century
- Consecrated: 11 May 1867; 7 April 1933

Architecture
- Architect: Ivan Vasilyov (1933)
- Architectural type: Church
- Style: Byzantine Revival
- Completed: 10th century; 1867–1898; 1933

Specifications
- Length: 30 m (98 ft)
- Width: 15.5 m (51 ft)

Administration
- Province: Bulgarian Patriarchate
- Diocese: Sofia

The Saint Nedelya Cathedral (Bulgarian: Катедрален храм "Св. великомъченица Неделя" в София or църква „Света Неделя“, romanized: Sveta Nedelya), is an Eastern Orthodox cathedral in Sofia, the capital of Bulgaria, a cathedral of the Sofia bishopric of the Bulgarian Patriarchate. The temple of Sveta Nedelya dates from the 10th century, being a cathedral of the city from the 18th century. The sacred building suffered destruction through the ages and was reconstructed many times. The present building of the temple is among the landmarks of Sofia. It was designed by the famous Bulgarian architectural team Vasilyov-Tsolov. The relics of the Serbian king Stefan Uroš II Milutin are kept in the church.

== History ==
The history of the cathedral's earliest years is to a large extent unknown. It was probably built in the 10th century and had stone foundations and an otherwise wooden construction, remaining wooden until the middle of the 19th century, unlike most other churches in the city. A German traveller by the name of Stephan Gerlach visited Sofia in 1578 and mentioned the church.

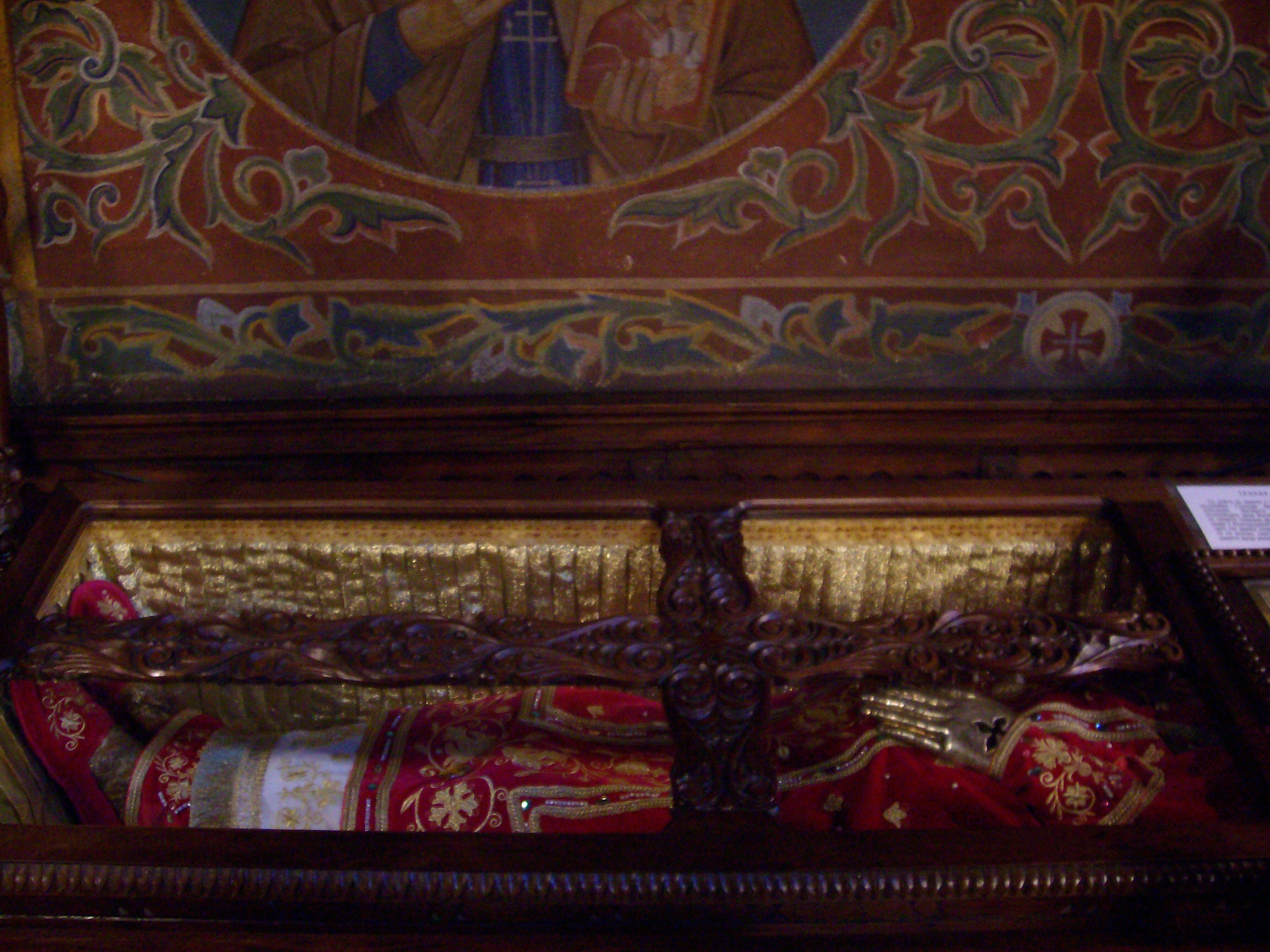
The relics of Serbian king Stefan Milutin (r. 1282–1321) in the St Nedelya Church

Around 1460, the remains of Serbian king Stefan Uroš II Milutin were carried to Bulgaria and were stored in various churches and monasteries until being transferred to St Nedelya after it became a bishop's residence in the 18th century. With some interruptions, the remains have been preserved in the church ever since and the church acquired another name, Holy King („Свети Крал“, „Sveti Kral“), in the late 19th and early 20th century.

The former building was demolished to make place for a larger and more imposing cathedral on 25 April 1856. The construction of the 35.5-metre-long (116 ft) and 19-metre-wide (62 ft) church began in the summer of the same year. The still incomplete building suffered from an earthquake in 1858, which prolonged the construction works that ultimately finished in 1863. It was officially inaugurated on 11 May 1867 in the presence of 20,000 people. A new belfry was erected to accommodate the eight bells given to the church as a present by Russian Knyaz (Prince) Alexander Mikhailovich Dondukov-Korsakov in 1879.

The church was renovated in 1898, with new domes being added. Exarch Joseph I of Bulgaria was buried immediately outside the walls of St Nedelya in 1915. The church was razed in the bomb attack in 1925 that claimed over 150 victims. After the incident, the church was restored to its modern appearance between the summer of 1927 and the spring of 1933 (once again inaugurated on 7 April 1933). It was almost erected anew as a temple 30 metres (98 ft) long and 15.5 metres (51 ft) wide and featuring a central dome that made it 31 metres (102 ft) high. The gilt iconostasis that survived the bomb attack was returned to the church.

The mural decoration was done by a team led by Nikolay Rostovtsev between 1971 and 1973. The floor was renovated and the north colonnade was glazed between 1992 and 1994. The façade was cleaned thoroughly in 2000 and a device to automatically ring the eleven bells (the eight ones from Knyaz Dondukov-Korsakov, two made in Serbia and one cast in Bulgaria).

== Etymology ==
The origin of the name Sveta Nedelya is rather obscure. It can be translated as either "Holy Sunday", "Saint Nedelya", or even as "Saint Sunday", depending on which etymology is taken as the basis. According to the Bulgarian Orthodox website pravoslavieto.com, the church was noted by a German traveller, Stephan Gerlach, in 1578, as being known by several names, among which "The Lord's Church" (Bulgarian: Gospodnya Tsurkva) and "Jesus Christ Church" (Tsurkva Isus Hristos) but, more importantly, by the Greek name Kyriaki, a word literally meaning "Sunday", but which itself derives from Kyrios – "Lord" (i.e. Sunday, or Kyriaki = "The Lord's Day" and hence "The Lord's Church"). Furthermore, Kyriaki is also the name of a third-century Christian martyr – Saint Kyriaki, known in Bulgarian as Sveta Nedelya (Nedelya = "Sunday"). So, even though today the meaning appears to refer to the holiness of the day of Sunday, it may have originally referred to the young martyr Saint Kyriaki, or ultimately to Jesus Christ.

== Gallery ==
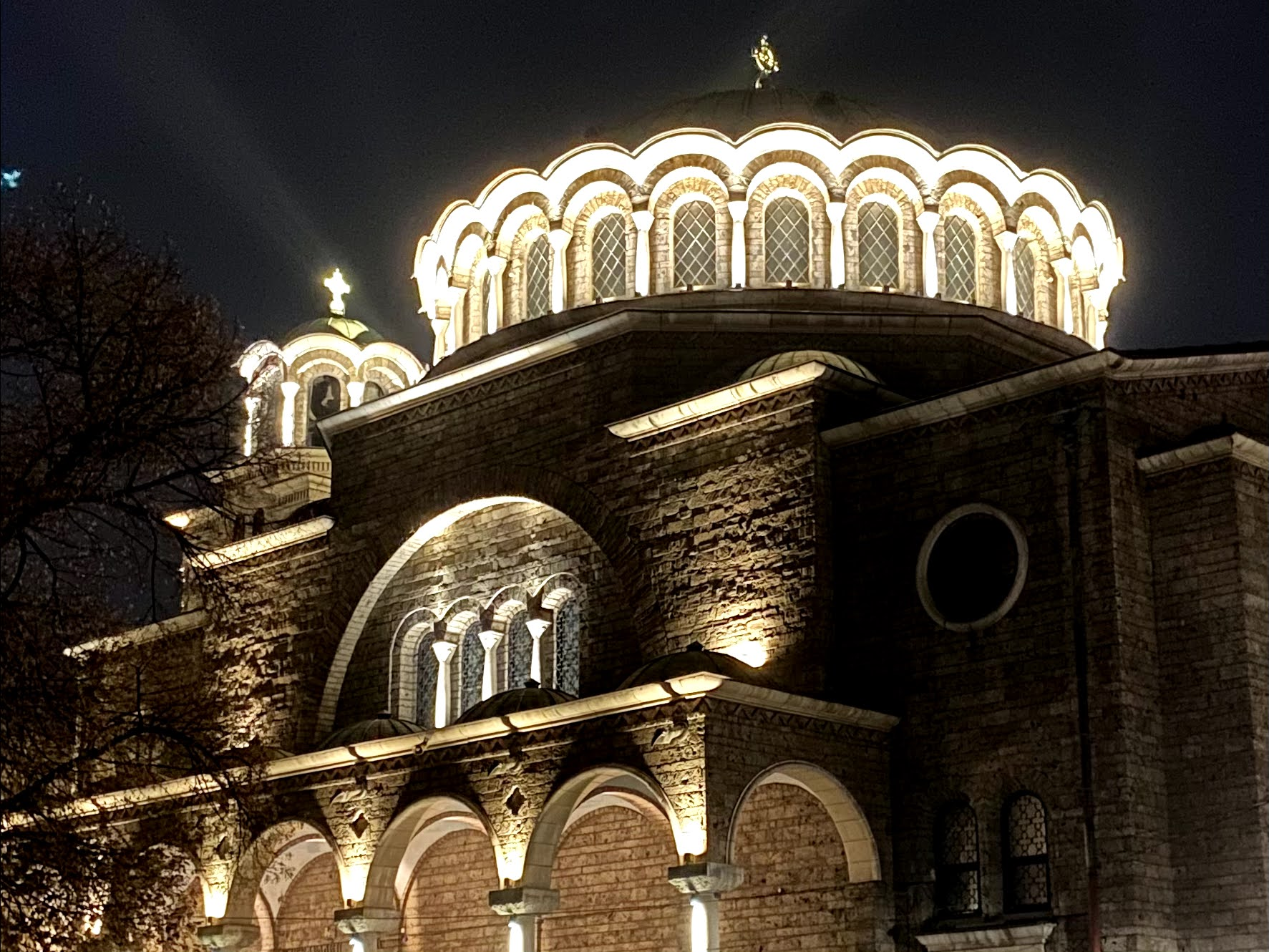
Saint Nedelya Church at night

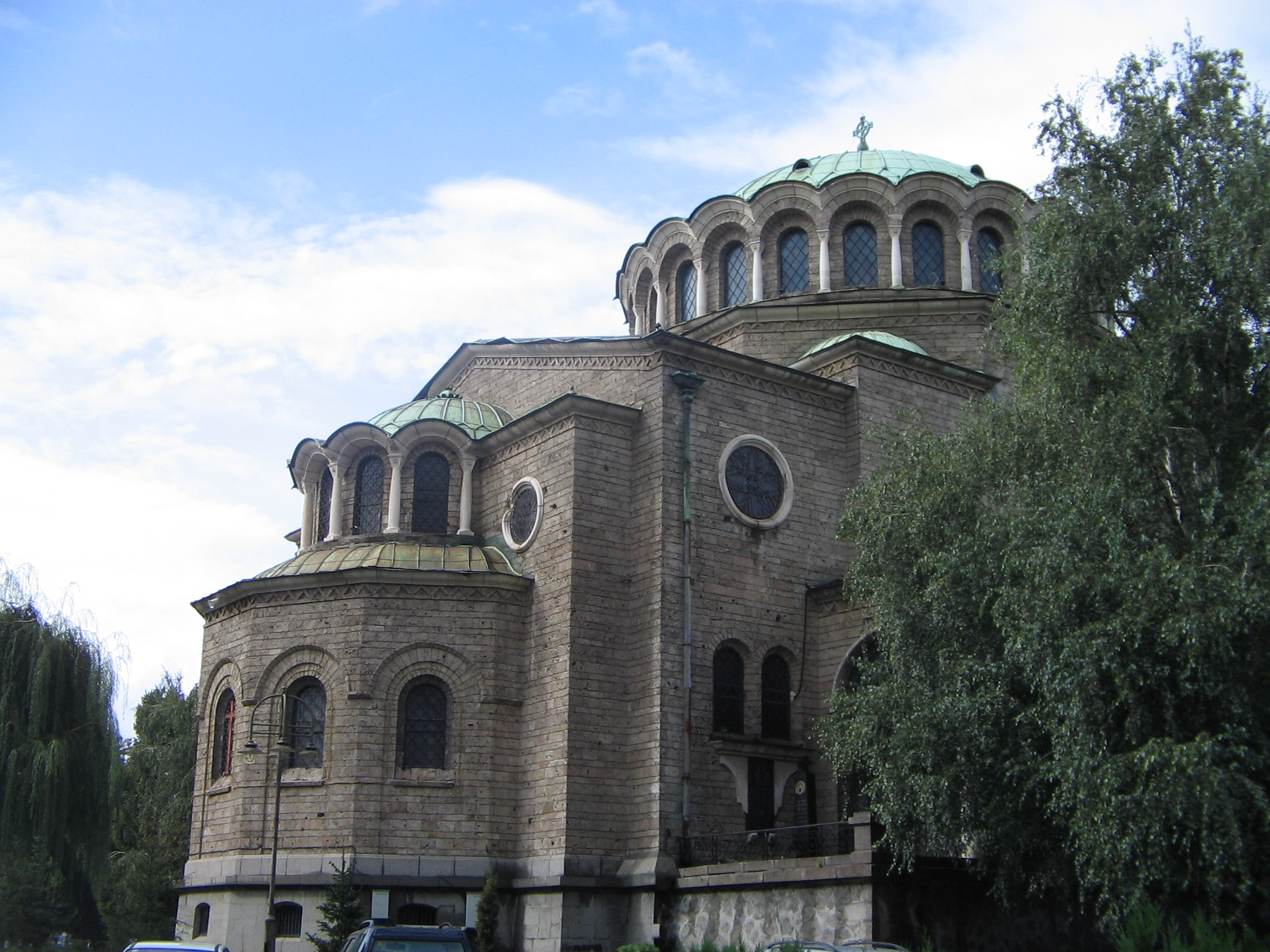
Another view

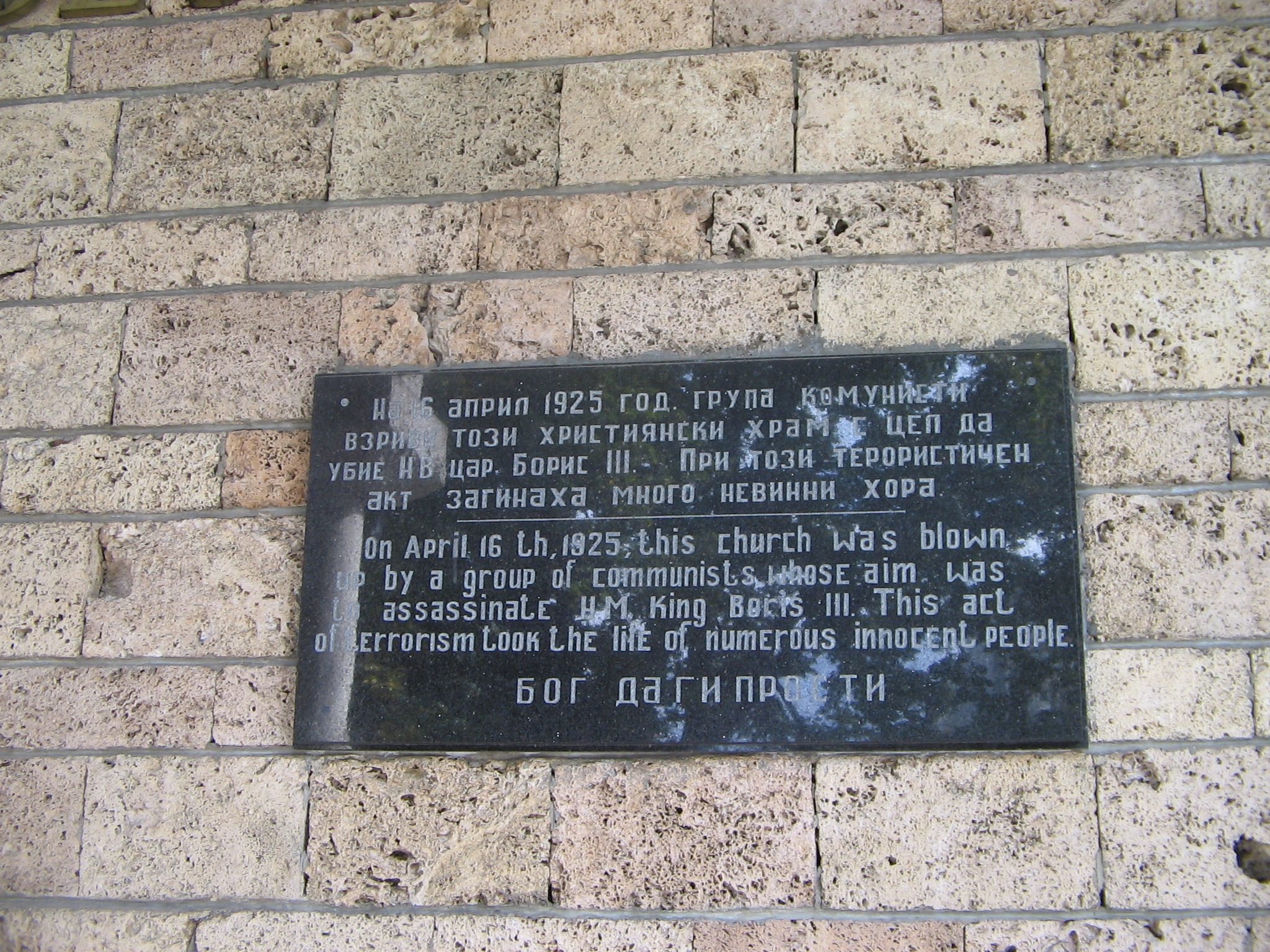
A plaque commemorating the victims of the St Nedelya Church assault

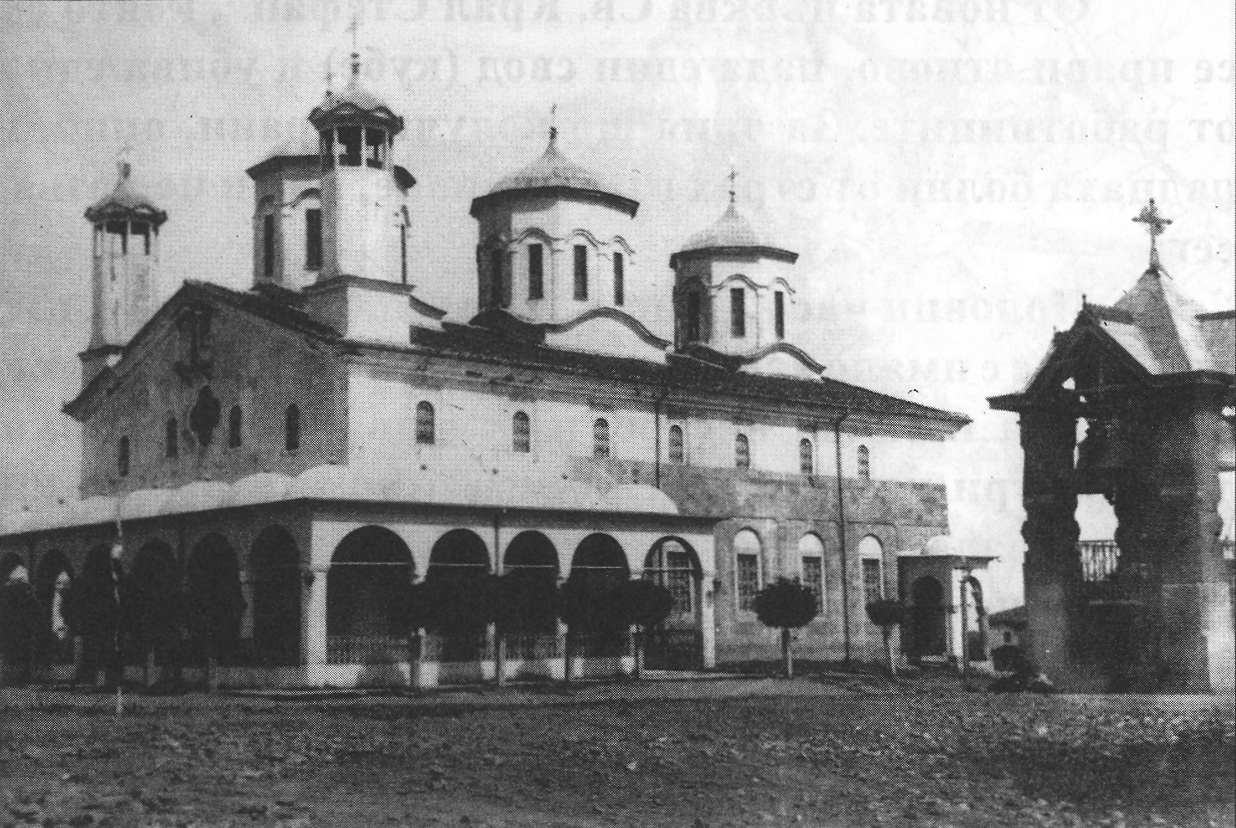
Saint Nedelya Church around 1880

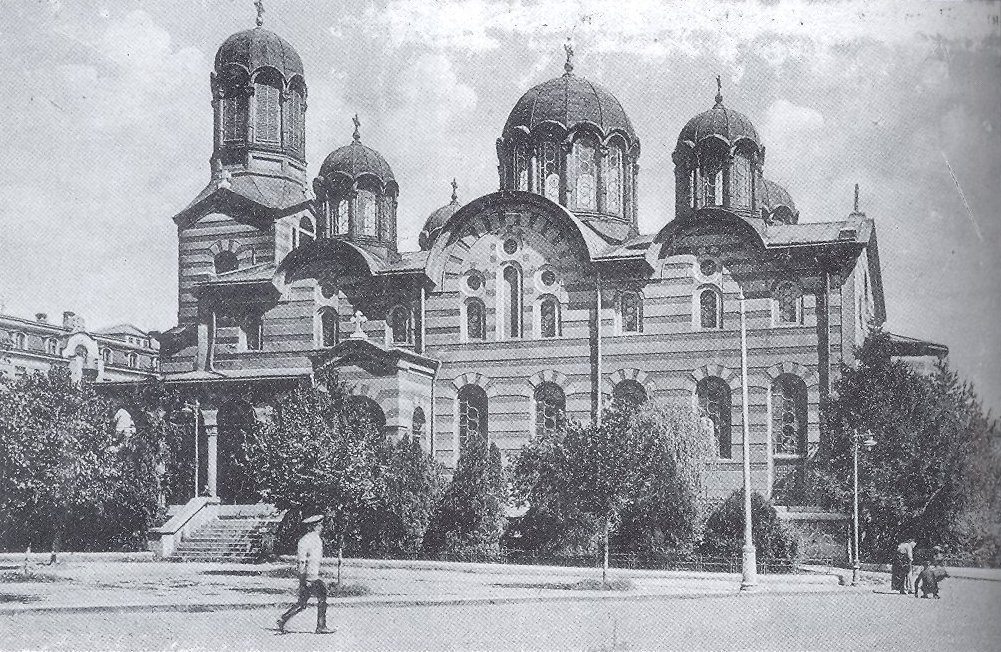
The renovated Saint Nedelya Church in 1922, shortly before the assault

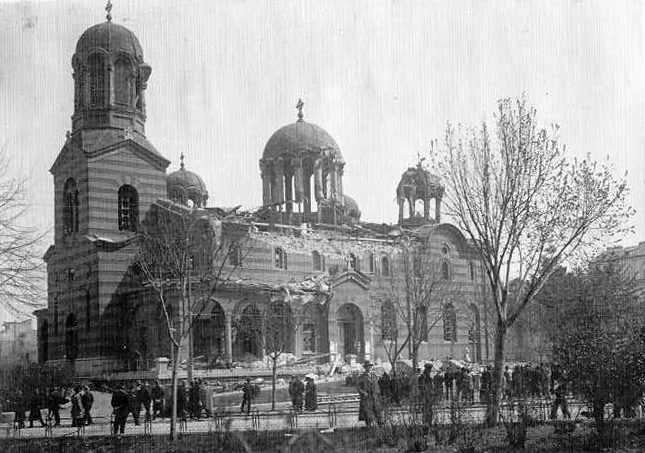
Saint Nedelya Church after the assault in 1925

== See also ==
- List of churches in Sofia
