= Kiril Kurtev =

Bulgarian Greek Catholic bishop

- Apostolic Exarch of Sofia
- Native name: Кирил Куртев
- Church: Bulgarian Greek Catholic Church
- See: Apostolic Exarchate of Sofia
- In office: 27 April 1951 – 9 March 1971; 31 July 1926 – 30 May 1941
- Predecessor: 1st: Exarchate erected 2nd: Ivan Garufalov
- Successor: 1st: Ivan Garufalov; 2nd:Methodius Stratiev
- Other post: Titular Eparch of Briula (1926-1971)

Orders
- Ordination: 1 June 1914 by Michael Petkov
- Consecration: 5 December 1926 by Athanasius Khoriaty

Personal details
- Born: Kiril Stefanov Kurtev; 18 June 1891 Dripchevo, Adrianople vilayet, Ottoman Empire
- Died: 9 March 1971 (aged 79) Kuklen, Plovdiv District, People's Republic of Bulgaria

Cyril Stefanov Kurtev (18 June 1891 in Dripchevo, Ottoman Empire, today Bulgaria – 9 March 1971 in Kuklen, Plovdiv Province, Bulgaria) was a Bulgarian Greek Catholic bishop.

== Biography ==
Bishop Cyril Kurtev was born into an Orthodox family in the Dripchevo village (today in Haskovo Province). In 1901 he began his studies at the elementary school at a monastery in the nearby village Mustrak, the former monastery known throughout Eastern Thrace as Monk Panteleimon.

Kurtev continued his studies in Karaağaç, Edirne at the Assumptionists college fathers, where he studied until 1908. To prepare for the priesthood, Kurtev was sent to the major seminary of Saint Leo in Constantinople. On 8 September 1913 he was ordained a deacon by Archbishop Michael Mirov. On 1 June 1914 Kurtev was ordained a priest by Bishop Michael Petkov in the Cathedral of Saint Elias in Edirne. In the spring of 1924 he became assistant of Josaphat Kozarov, administrator of Greek Catholics in Bulgaria. On 23 September 1925 Mirov was appointed Acting Administrator of Bulgarian Exarchate of the Greek Catholics. On 25 July 1926 by Pope Pius XII he was appointed bishop, and the ordination took place on December 5, 1925 at the Cathedral of Saint Clement in Rome. As a symbol of his future ministry Kurtev took a new name Cyril, in honor of Saint Cyril of Thessalonica. On 30 May 1941 he unexpectedly resigned, and was replaced by Ivan Garufalov whom he personally ordained bishop. Garufalov's death of forces Cyril return to his post in 1951. At this time Kurtev remains the only Catholic bishop in Communist Bulgaria, he had to take care not only of the Greek-Catholics, and the Catholics of Latin rite of the Nikopol and Sophia-Plovdiv dioceses. In the 1960s, Bishop Kurtev took part in the II Vatican Council. On 7 March 1971 in the city of Kuklen, during the liturgy the Bishop suffered a heart attack. He died two days later.
