= Zornitsa =

Zornitsa may refer to:

- Zornitsa, Blagoevgrad Province
- Zornitsa, Burgas Province
- Zornitsa, Haskovo Province
- Zornitsa, Kardzhali Province
- Zornitsa, Varna Province
- Zornitsa Cove
