= Christo Proykov =

Bulgarian Greek Catholic Bishop of Sofia

His Excellency Christo Proykov
- Apostolic Exarch of Sofia
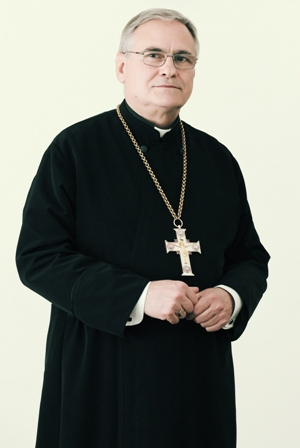
- Episcopus Christo Proykov 2013
- Church: Bulgarian Greek Catholic Church
- Diocese: Apostolic Exarchate of Sofia
- Appointed: 18 December 1993
- Installed: 5 September 1995
- Term ended: 8 April 2024
- Predecessor: Methodius Stratiev
- Successor: Petko Valov
- Other posts: Titular Bishop of Briula; Chairman of the Episcopal Conference of Bulgaria

Orders
- Ordination: 23 May 1971
- Consecration: 6 January 1994 by John Paul II

Personal details
- Born: 11 March 1946 (age 80) Sofia, Bulgaria

Christo Proykov (Bulgarian: Христо Пройков; born 11 March 1946) is a Bulgarian Greek Catholic who served as the Eparch of the Bulgarian Greek Catholic Eparchy of Saint John XXIII of Sofia until his retirement in July 2024. previously he served as a Coadjutor Bishop of Sofia and Titular Bishop of Briula on 18 December 1993. On 6 January 1994 Proykov was ordained bishop and on 5 September 1995 he became Bishop of Sofia.

== Biography ==
Born in Sofia on 11 March 1946. On 6 September 1970 he was ordained a deacon by Bishop Kiril Kurtev, and on 23 May 1971 ordained a priest by Bishop Methodius Stratiev. In 1980–1982, he specialized canon law at the Pontifical Oriental Institute in Rome, Italy. In 1982, he was a parish priest at the Cathedral of the Dormition in Sofia. In December 1991, he refounded the newspaper "Truth - Veritas", a continuation of the newspaper "Truth".

On 18 December 1993 is preconized as Bishop of Sofia-coadjutor Apostolic Exarchate and titular bishop of Briun. On 6 January 1994 was ordained a bishop in the Basilica St. Peter in Rome by Pope John Paul II, in co-service with Cardinal Giovanni Battista Re and Archbishop Josip Uhach.

Manages the Catholic Exarchate of 5 September 1995 Bishop Christo Proykov chairman of the Episcopal Conference of Bulgaria by 1995. The Episcopal Conference of Bulgaria is chairman of these committees:

- Commission for Clergy
- Commission for Catholic Education and for titles
- Council for pastoral care over migrants and travelers
- Council for pastoral care health service

On 15 May 2009 he was appointed by Pope Benedict XVI as a consultant to the Dicastery for the Eastern Churches of the Roman Curia.

On 8 April 2024, Pope Francis accepted his resignation upon reaching the age limit and appointed Petko Valov as the second Eparch of the Bulgarian Greek Catholic Eparchy of Saint John XXIII of Sofia.

== Awards ==
On 15 November 2007 a ceremony was held of the Grand Cross "Pro piis meritis Melitensi" Order of Malta of Mgr. Proykov. Through awards Order of Malta expresses its gratitude to the Catholic Church in the country for helping to introduction of medicins as humanitarian aid during the 1990s.

The name and titles of Exarch Proykov in Latin are the following: Exc.mus ac Rev.mus D.nus Christo Proykov, Dei et Sedis Apostolicæ gratia Episcopus titularis Briulitanus, Exarcha Apostolicus Sophiæ pro catholicis ritus byzantini-slavi in Bulgaria commorantibus, Præses Conferentiæ Episcopalis Bulgariæ.
