= Apostolic Vicariate of Constantinople (disambiguation) =

The term Apostolic Vicariate of Constantinople may refer to:

- Roman Catholic Apostolic Vicariate of Constantinople, former name (until 1990) of the present Apostolic Vicariate of Istanbul
- Bulgarian Catholic Apostolic Vicariate of Constantinople, former Apostolic Vicariare for Catholic Bulgarians of the Byzantine Rite (1861-1926)

== See also ==
- Apostolic Vicariate
- Constantinople
- Catholic Church in Turkey
- Bulgarian Byzantine Catholic Church
