= Epiphanius Shanov =

Epiphany Shanov
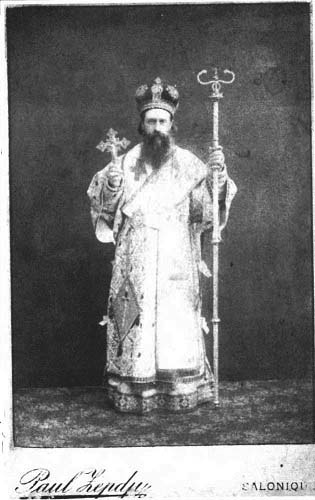
- Bishop Epiphanius Shanov, Byzantine-Catholic Apostolic Vicar of Macedonia (1895–1922)
- Born: Boncho Shanov; October 18, 1849; Kazanlak, Ottoman Empire
- Died: 1940; Kazanlak, Bulgaria
- Occupation: Apostolic Vicar

Epiphany Shanov (Bulgarian: Епифаний Шанов 1849–1940) was a Bulgarian Uniate priest.

== Biography ==
Shanov was born in Kazanlak on October 18, 1849. He received primary education there. At the age of 12, he began studying at the Uniate Gymnasium in Edirne. Shanov continued his education in Rome and in 1873 was ordained as a priest. Afterwards, Epiphany served in Thessaloniki, where he spent the next years of his life. After the recall of Lazar Mladenov on July 23, 1895, he became the Bishop of the Bulgarian Uniat Church in Macedonia and on September 8, 1895 in Istanbul he was granted the title Livadian Bishop and appointed as Apostolic vicar in Macedonia. Initially his office was in Kilkis. Bishop Epiphany Shanov supported the activities of the Internal Macedonian Revolutionary Organization (IMRO). In 1903 in Macedonia, under his leadership, over 10,000 Uniates lived in 20 villages, 10 churches, 30 priests, including 13 boys' and 9 girls' schools.

In 1909, Shanov resigned, but his resignation was not accepted by the Apostolic Delegate. Shanov remained head of the Bulgarian Uniate Church during the Balkan Wars. In 1913, Greek soldiers arrested him and he went into exile first to the island of Naxos and then to Trikeri, where he remained until the First World War ended. Shanov was released in 1919 and retired to Kazanlak. In the late summer of 1921 he again asked the Pope in Rome to be released from his duties as Bishop of the Thessaloniki diocese. The Pope accepted his request and he retired to Kazanlak, where he died in 1940.

== See also ==
- Macedonian Apostolic Vicariate of the Bulgarians
