= Bulgarian Catholic Apostolic Vicariate of Constantinople =

Eastern Catholic ecclesiastical jurisdiction in Turkey (1861-1883)

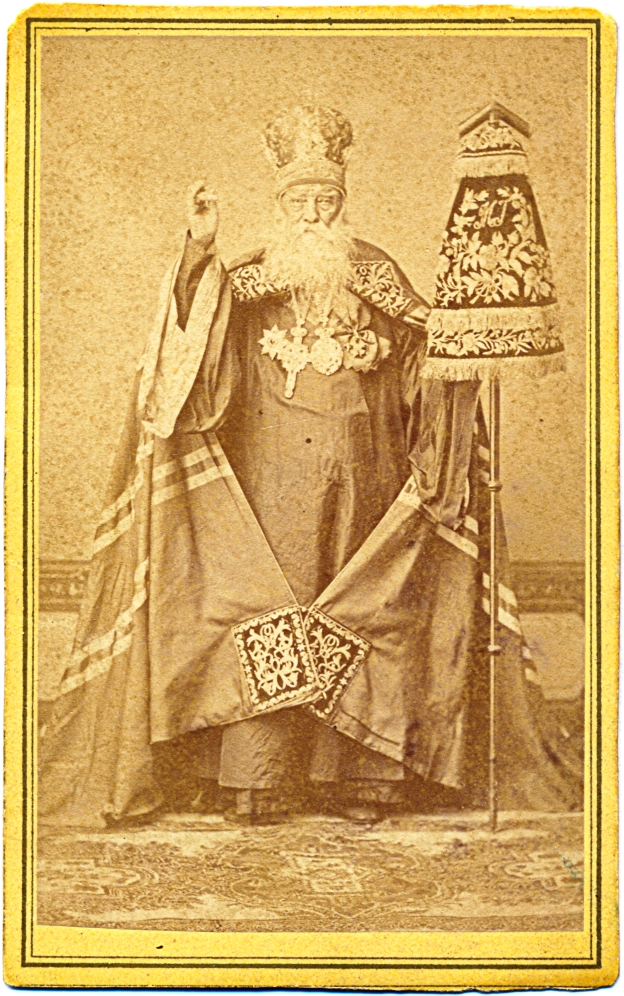
Archbishop Joseph Sokolsky, November 1872. Source: Bulgarian Archives State Agency

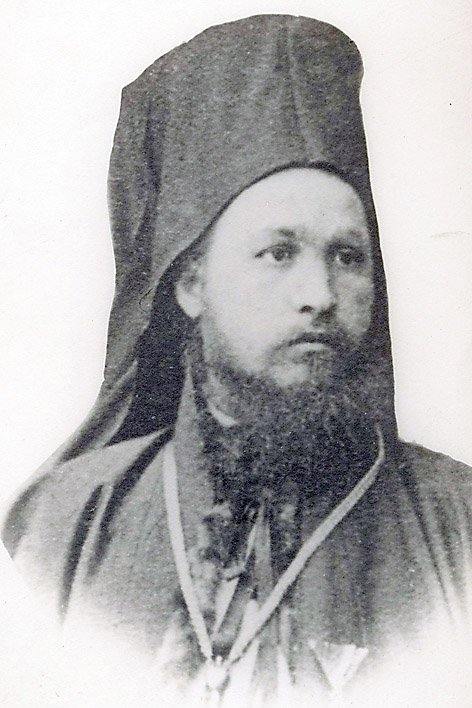
Raphael Popov (1830-1876), Bulgarian Byzantine-Catholic Bishop

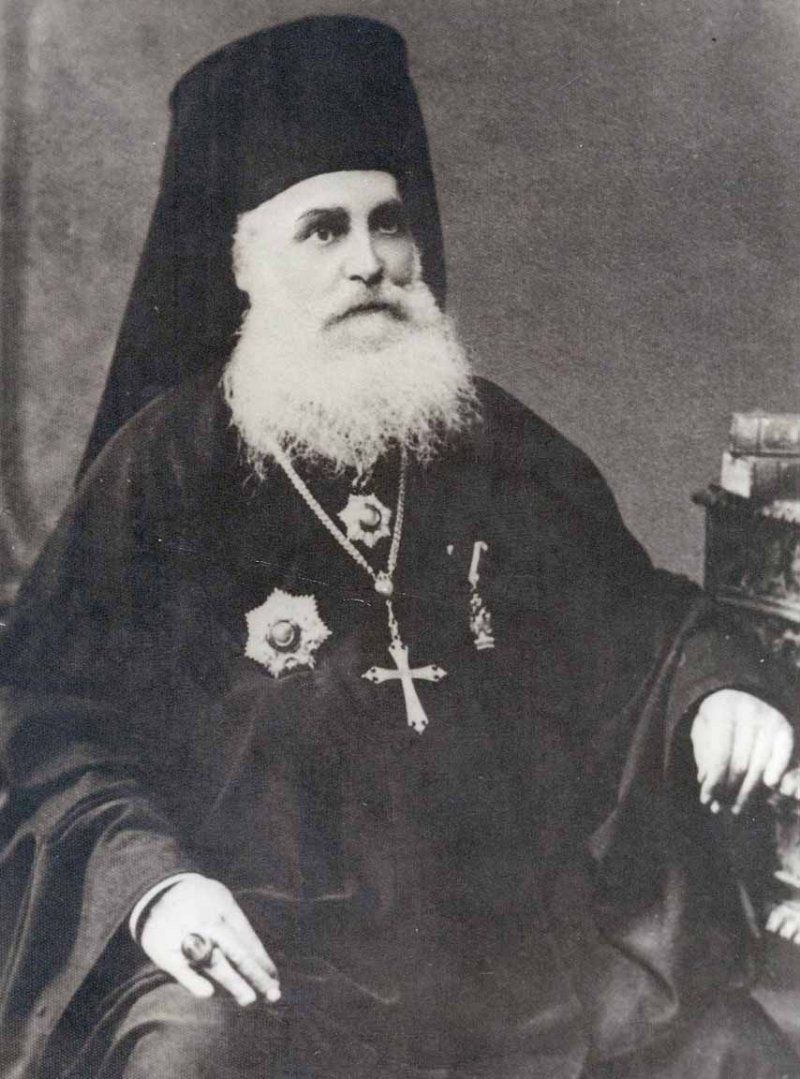
Archbishop Nil Izvorov (1823-1905)

The Bulgarian Catholic Apostolic Vicariate of Constantinople (informally Constantinople of the Bulgarians) was the first missionary, pre-diocesan jurisdiction of the Bulgarian Greek Catholic Church sui iuris (Eastern Catholic of Byzantine Rite in Bulgarian language). As Apostolic Vicariate it was exempt, i.e. directly dependent on the Holy See, and entitled to a titular bishop. It was created in 1861 and reorganized in 1883.

== History ==
Since the Union of Kukush in 1859, there was a movement among Bulgarians who converted from Eastern Orthodoxy to Eastern Catholicism for creation of a particular ecclesiastical jurisdiction. On April 14, 1861 in the Sistine Chapel in Rome, Bulgarian Byzantine-Catholic archimandrite Joseph Sokolsky was consecrated Archbishop, and appointed apostolic vicar for the Catholic Bulgarians of the Byzantine Rite in Ottoman Empire. Upon his return to Constantinople, he was accepted in that capacity by the authorities of Ottoman Empire. Sokolsky was recognized by the Ottoman government as secular head of the Bulgarian Catholic Millet (millet basi) and the Sultan issued a special decree (irade) for that occasion. However, in the summer of the very same year he was detached for Russia, never to return to his post. He died in 1879.

When it became obvious that Joseph Sokolsky will not be returning from Russia, one of his closest associates - Bulgarian Byzantine-Catholic priest Raphael Popov was recognized in 1864 as "Patriarchal Vicar and popular leader of the Bulgarians united with the Roman Catholic Church" by the Ottoman authorities. On March 28, 1865 he was appointed Apostolic Administrator (pro tempore) of the Bulgarian Byzantine-Catholic Church and its vicariate in Constantinople. He was ordained a bishop on November 19, 1865 in the cathedral church "St. John Chrysostom" in Constantinople. Later he transferred his offices to Edirne and continued serving until his death on February 23, 1876.

He was succeeded by bishop Nil Izvorov, who previously converted from Eastern Orthodoxy to Eastern Catholicism in 1874. His succession was confirmed on 5 September 1876 by the Holy See and thus he became the new head of Bulgarian Byzantine-Catholic Church and administrator (pro tempore) of its vicariate in Constantinople.

In 1878, autonomous Principality of Bulgaria and province of Eastern Rumelia were created. In following years important reorganization took place. in 1883, Nil Izvorov was promoted to Archbishop, and on that occasion new arrangements were made for the future administration. On 7 April 1883, the vicariate lost Turkish Thrace as territory to establish the Bulgarian Catholic Apostolic Vicariate of Thrace. On 12 June 1883 its western territory was reorganized as the Bulgarian Catholic Apostolic Vicariate of Macedonia, which covered entire historical region of Macedonia (the Salonica Vilayet). New vicariates remained under spiritual jurisdiction of Archbishop Nil Izvorov.

In 1895, Nil Izvorov converted back to Eastern Orthodoxy, retrieved to Bulgaria and died in 1905. In 1907, priest Michael Mirov was appointed titular Archbishop of Theodosiopolis and took the administration of the Bulgarian Byzantine-Catholic Vicariate in Constantinople. He served there until his death in 1923.

During his administration, important events took place. In 1912, Balkan Wars broke out and by 1913 Ottoman Empire lost entire region of Macedonia and much of the Thrace. Soon after that, First World War (1914-1918) broke out. During those years, Bulgarian Catholic vicariates suffered drastic reduction of their jurisdiction, and after 1918 new arrangements had to be made.

After death of archbishop Michael Mirov in 1923, the vicariate was finally suppressed in 1926 and its remaining (Bulgarian) territory reassigned to establish the Bulgarian Catholic Apostolic Exarchate of Sofia, which remained as the particular church's last and only jurisdiction, absorbing both Constantinople's above daughter vicariates, Thrace and Macedonia.

== See also ==
- Greek Catholic Apostolic Exarchate of Constantinople
- Catholic Church in Turkey
- Catholic Church in Bulgaria
- Bulgarian Millet

== Sources ==
- Frazee, Charles A. (2006) [1983]. Catholics and Sultans: The Church and the Ottoman Empire 1453-1923. Cambridge: Cambridge University Press. ISBN 9780521027007.
