= Mirov =

Mirov may refer to

- Mírov, a village and municipality in the Czech Republic
- Mirow, a town in Germany
- Mirov (surname)
