= Stratiev =

Stratiev (Bulgarian: Стратиев) is a Bulgarian masculine surname, its feminine counterpart is Stratieva. Notable people with the surname include:

- Metodi Stratiev (1916–2006), Bulgarian Greek Catholic archbishop
- Stanislav Stratiev (1941–2000), Bulgarian playwright, screenwriter and author
- Ekaterina Stratieva (born 1982), Bulgarian rally driver
