= Mirov (surname) =

Mirov (Russian: Миров, from mir meaning world or peace) is a Russian masculine surname, its feminine counterpart is Mirova. It may refer to

- Alexander Abramov-Mirov (1895–1937), Soviet Comintern communications officer and intelligence agent
- Michael Mirov (1859–1923), Bulgarian Greek Catholic bishop
