= Eparchy of Sofia (Bulgarian Greek Catholic) =

Greek Catholic eparchy in Bulgaria

Coordinates: 42.6913°N 23.3134°E

Eparchy of Saint John XXIII of Sofia Eparchia Sanctus Ioannes XXIII Sophiæ
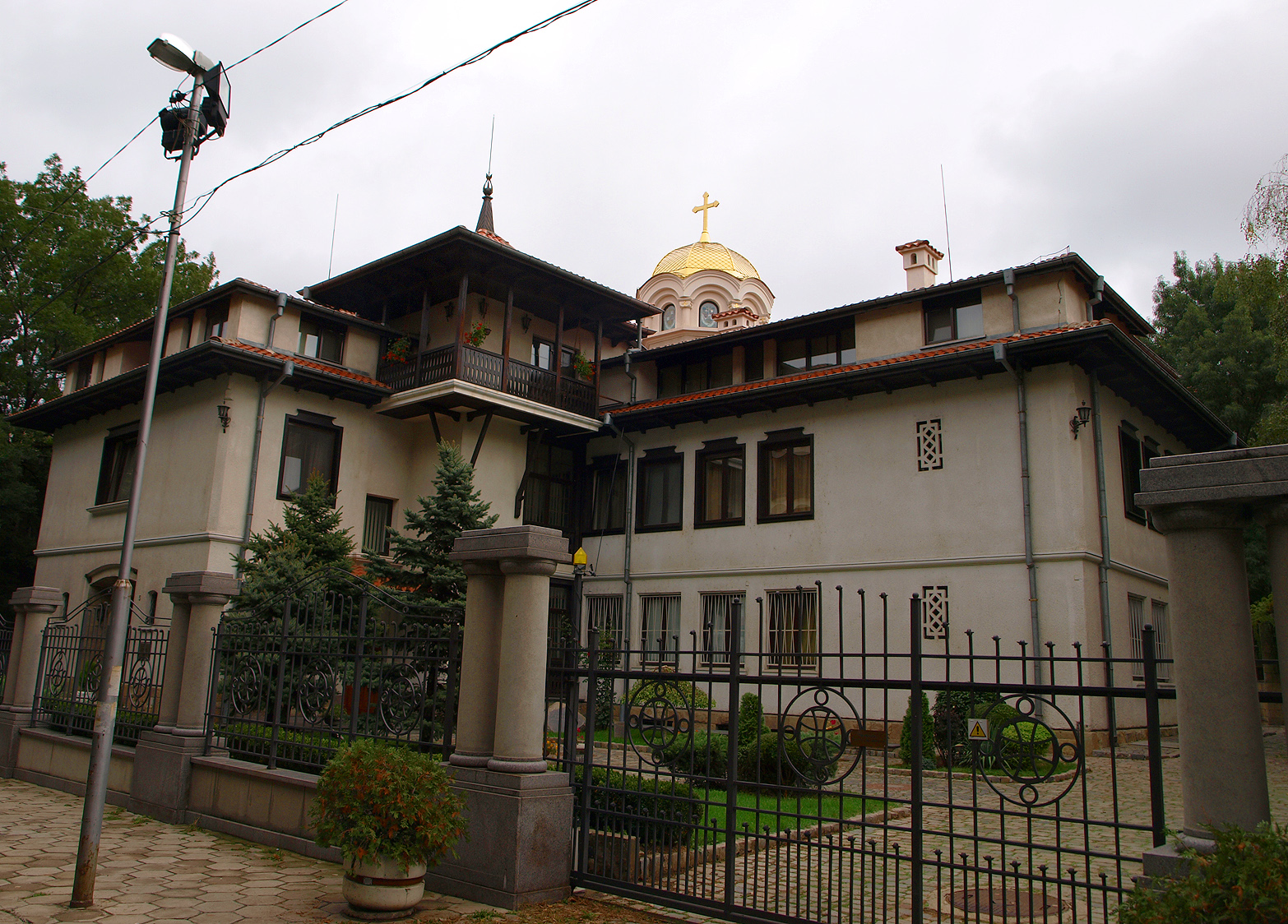
- Cathedral of the Dormition

Location
- Country: Bulgaria

Information
- Denomination: Catholic Church
- Sui iuris church: Bulgarian Greek Catholic Church
- Established: 1926; 100 years ago
- Cathedral: Dormition of the Blessed Virgin Mary

Current leadership
- Pope: Leo XIV
- Bishop: Petko Valov
- Bishops emeritus: Christo Proykov

Website
- http://www.kae-bg.org/

The Bulgarian Catholic Eparchy of Saint John XXIII of Sofia is an eparchy of the Bulgarian Greek Catholic Church which is a sui iuris ("autonomous") Eastern Catholic church based in Bulgaria. As a particular church of the Catholic Church, it is in full communion with the Holy See. The Church is organised as a single eparchy (equivalent to a diocese in the Latin Church). Its liturgical usage is that of the Byzantine Rite in the Bulgarian language. It was elevated from an Apostolic Exarchate to a full eparchy by Pope Francis on 12 October 2019. The cathedral church of the eparchy is the Cathedral of the Dormition (Катедрала Успение Богородично Катедрала Успение Богородично), in Bulgaria's capital Sofia.

== History ==
It was established in 1926 as Apostolic Exarchate of Sofia, on Bulgarian territory split off from the suppressed Bulgarian Catholic Apostolic Vicariate of Constantinople and both its daughters Bulgarian Catholic Apostolic Vicariate of Macedonia and Bulgarian Catholic Apostolic Vicariate of Thrace (which also covered Greece, Turkey and Macedonia), reuniting the original Balkanic jurisdiction.

== Statistics ==
As per 2014, it pastorally served 10,000 Bulgarian (Byzantine Rite) Catholics in 20 parishes with 17 priests (4 diocesan, 13 religious), 42 lay religious (15 brothers, 27 sisters), and 1 seminarian.

== Ordinaries ==
Apostolic Exarchs of Sofia

- Kiril Kurtev first time (1926.07.31 – 1942 see below), Titular Bishop of Briula (1926.07.31 – death 1971.03.09)
- Ivan Garufaloff, C.R. (1942.07.06 – 1951.08.07)
- Kyril Stefan Kurteff again (see above 1951.04.27 – death 1971.03.09)
- Metodi Stratiev, A.A. (1971.03.09 – 1995.09.05), Titular Bishop of Diocletianopolis in Thracia (1963.04.28 – death 2006.05.12), also President of Episcopal Conference of Bulgaria (1970 – 1995); succeeded as former Coadjutor Apostolic Exarch of Sofia of the Bulgarians (Bulgaria) (1963.04.28 – 1971.03.09)
- Christo Proykov (1995.09.05 – 2019.10.11), Titular Bishop of Briula (1993.12.18 – ...), also President of Episcopal Conference of Bulgaria (1995 – ...); succeeded as former Coadjutor Apostolic Exarch of Sofia of the Bulgarians (Bulgaria) (1993.12.18 – 1995.09.05).

Eparchs of Sofia

- Christo Proykov (2019.10.11 – 2024.04.08)
- Petko Valov (2024.04.08 – present)

== See also ==
- List of Catholic dioceses in Bulgaria
- Catholic Church in Bulgaria

== Sources and external links ==
- GCatholic, with Google satellite photo - data for all sections; with incumbent bio links
- GCatholic - Cathedral of the Dormition of the Blessed Virgin Mary
- Catholic Hierarchy: Apostolic Exarchate of Sofia (Bulgarian) ^{[self-published]}
