= Petko Valov =

Bulgarian Greek Catholic bishop (born 1966)

His Excellency, The Most Reverend Petko Valov
- Eparch of Saint John XXIII of Sofia
- Church: Bulgarian Greek Catholic Church
- Province: Immediate subject of the Holy See
- Diocese: Saint John XXIII of Sofia
- Appointed: 8 April 2024
- Predecessor: Christo Proykov
- Previous posts: Chancellor of the Eparchy (2009–2024); Parish priest of Dormition of Mary, Novo Delchevo (1999–2024)

Orders
- Ordination: 11 October 1997 by Christo Proykov
- Consecration: 6 July 2024 by Christo Proykov, Strahil Kavalenov and Manuel Nin

Personal details
- Born: Petko Valov; 8 January 1966 (age 60) Sofia, Bulgaria
- Residence: Sofia, Bulgaria
- Parents: Nikola Valov and Dimitrina Valova
- Education: Pontifical Urban University, Pontifical Gregorian University, Pontifical Lateran University, Pontifical Alphonsian Academy

Petko Valov (Bulgarian: Петко Вълов; born 8 January 1966) is a Bulgarian Greek Catholic prelate who has served as Eparch of Sofia since 2024.

== Biography ==
Petko Valov was born on 8 January 1966 in Sofia, Bulgaria. His father, Nikola, was Eastern Orthodox, while his mother, Dimitrina, belonged to the Eastern Catholic rite. After completing his secondary education in Sofia, he graduated from the Yordanka Filaretova Medical College, specializing in dental technology.

From 1990 to 1997, he resided in Rome as a student at the Pontifical Greek College. During this period, he completed his philosophical studies at the Pontifical Urban University and his theological studies at the Pontifical Gregorian University. He later obtained a licentiate in moral theology from the Pontifical Lateran University and completed specialized studies in bioethics at the Pontifical Alphonsian Academy.

=== Priesthood ===
Valov was ordained a priest on 11 October 1997 by Bishop Christo Proykov for the Apostolic Exarchate of Sofia.

In 1999, he was appointed parish priest of the Dormition of Mary church in the village of Novo Delchevo, Blagoevgrad Province. In 2009, he took on the additional spiritual care of the Saint John XXIII parish in Sandanski.

Within the eparchy, Valov was appointed Chancellor in 2009. He served as the delegate of the Catholic Church to the National Council of Religious Communities in Bulgaria from 2008, and in 2020 he became the secretary-general of the Inter-ritual Bishops' Conference of Bulgaria. From 2022, he also served as the president of the governing board of Caritas Sofia.

=== Episcopal ministry ===
On 8 April 2024, Pope Francis appointed Valov as the second Eparch of the Bulgarian Greek Catholic Eparchy of Saint John XXIII of Sofia, succeeding Bishop Christo Proykov, who resigned upon reaching the age limit.

He was consecrated as a bishop on 6 July 2024 during a divine liturgy held at the Cathedral of the Dormition of the Mother of God in Sofia. The principal consecrator was his predecessor, Bishop Christo Proykov, assisted by Bishop Strahil Kavalenov of the Latin Catholic Diocese of Nicopolis and Bishop Manuel Nin, Apostolic Exarch of Greece.
