= Lazar Mladenov =

Bulgarian Eastern Orthodox priest (1854–1918)

Lazar Mladenov C.M.
- Titular Bishop of Satala in Armenia
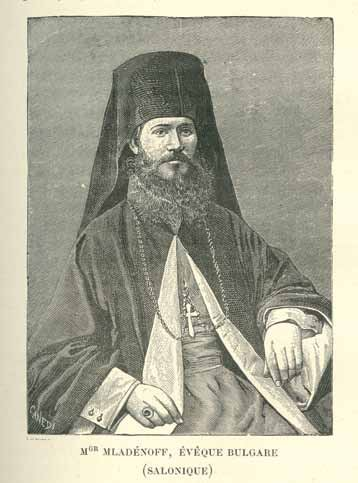
- Native name: Лазар Младенов
- Church: Bulgarian Greek Catholic Church
- See: Titular See of Satala in Armenia
- In office: 12 June 1883 – 4 March 1918
- Predecessor: Tomasz Teofil Kuliński
- Successor: François-Joseph Dantin
- Previous posts: Vicar Apostolic of Macedonia (1883-1895)

Orders
- Consecration: 5 August 1883 by Nilo Isvoroff

Personal details
- Born: 11 July 1854 Bansko, Salonica Eyalet, Ottoman Empire
- Died: 4 March 1918 (aged 63) Rome, Kingdom of Italy

Lazar Mladenov (Bulgarian: Лазар Димитров Младенов) (July 11, 1854 – March 4, 1918) was a Bulgarian Orthodox priest and, later, a member of the Bulgarian Greek Catholic Church in the Ottoman Empire and a convert to Eastern Catholicism.

== Biography ==
He was born in Bansko to Dimitar Poparabadzhiev, a Bulgarian Exarchate priest and a teacher. Dimitar wrote for the newspaper Bulgaria and corresponded with Dragan Tsankov, who would become the first Liberal Prime Minister of the country. Lazar's sister, Mila Dimitrova, was a member of the Internal Macedonian Revolutionary Organization (IMRO).

Mladenov attended a French Catholic school in Thessaloniki, graduated from highschool in Turin and attended the French college in Constantinople. After his spiritual education in Paris, he was ordained by the Archbishop of Paris. In June 1878, he was part of the French delegation to the Congress of Berlin. Later that year, he was sent to teach at the St. Benedict college in Constantinople, preferred a priestly vocation and began to serve in Thessaloniki.

During the administrative reorganization of the Catholic Church in Bulgaria in 1883, he was appointed Apostolic Vicariate for Catholic Bulgarians in Macedonia on June 12, 1883, and was consecrated by archbishop Nil Izvorov in Constantinople.

In early 1884, he was invited to a personal meeting with Pope Leo XIII in Rome, who confirmed the appointment of the young bishop of Apostolic Vicariate for Catholic Bulgarians in Macedonia, based in Thessaloniki. During his episcopal ministry in the late 1880s, the Uniat in Macedonia reached its apogee.

Thanks to his energy and the financial backing he received from the Church, Mladenov was able to provide several initiatives with grants, found several schools in his diocese and started working on a highschool in Kilkis, which he wasn't able to finish. In 1890, his initiatives paved the way for the founding of the Bulgarian Catholic cathedral as his bishop's seat. In 1894, financial scandals and affairs caused conflicts between several Catholic factions, and eventually led to his departure from the Episcopal department at the end of October 1894.

In early December 1894, Lazar Mladenov asked the Holy Synod in Sofia to be accepted into the Eastern Orthodox Church. The application was approved as a decree on 8 December of that year. Contrite, he returned to Catholicism in 1895 and went to Rome. Initially, he served as an advisor on Eastern affairs. Retaining that title, he was appointed assistant manager of the Vatican Library at the beginning of the 20th century. After 18 years in office, he wrote a book on the history of Bulgaria based on unpublished documents from the jurisdiction of his library.

== See also ==
- Macedonian Apostolic Vicariate of the Bulgarians

== Sources ==
- Giorgi Eldarov: Die Union der Bulgaren mit Rom. Zur Hundertjährigen Gedenkfeier (1860–1960) in Ostkirchliche Studien, 10, 1961, S. 3-27.
- Poole, Stafford C.M. (1995) "Eugène Boré and the Bulgarian Catholic Movement," Vincentian Heritage Journal: Vol. 16: Iss. 2, Article 5.
- The Macedonian question: culture, historiography, politics, Victor Roudometof, East European Monographs, 2000, ISBN 0-88033-451-7, p. 102.
- 10 anni di Papa Giovanni in Bulgaria, Giovanni Pesci, Greco & Greco, 1998, ISBN 88-7980-155-4, p. 43.
- The Future of the Oriental Catholic churches, Johannes Madey, Stanislaus, Thomas Erackel, Santinilayam Publications, 1979, p. 16.
- Католическа Апостолическа Екзархия София, Biography of Mladenov retrieved from the official webpage of the Bulgarian Greek Catholic Church.
- Bŭlgarskata ekzarkhia v Odrinsko i Makedonia: pt.1-2. 1878-1885, Kiril (Patriarch of Bulgaria), 1969, str. 84.
- Sbornik za narodni umotvorenia i narodopis, Bulgarian Academy of Sciences, 1954, str. 4.
