= Joseph Sokolsky =

19th-century religious figure from Bulgaria

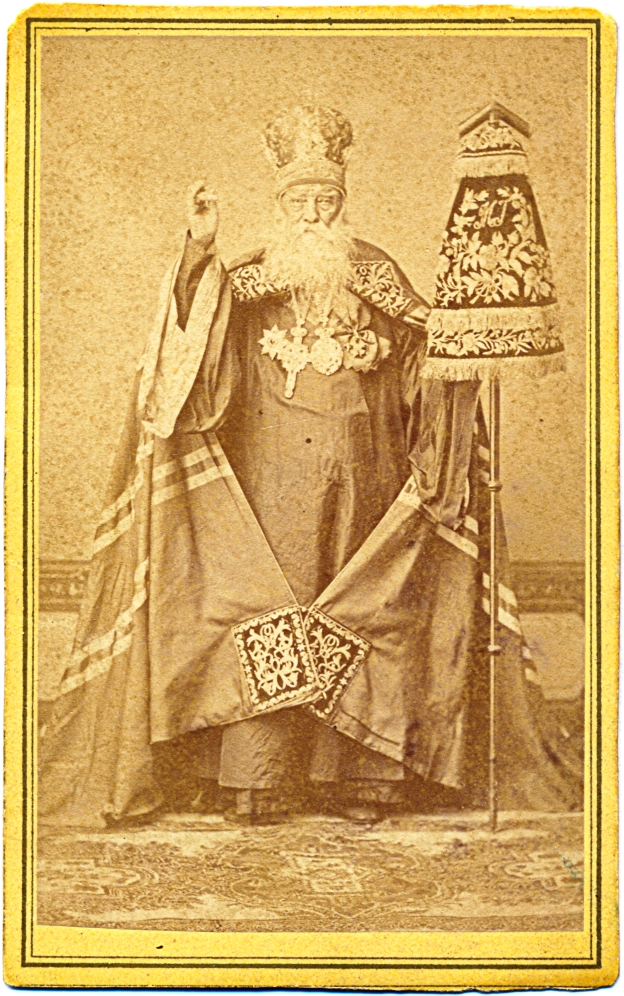
Joseph Sokolsky, November 1872. Source: Bulgarian Archives State Agency

Joseph Sokolsky (Bulgarian: Йосиф Соколски, Gabrovo, Ottoman Empire 1786 – died in Kiev, Russian Empire, 30 September 1879) was the first senior Eastern Orthodox Bulgarian clergyman to convert to Catholicism, thus becoming a pioneer of the Bulgarian Byzantine Catholic Church. Sokolsky negotiated with the Vatican a formal union due to Phanariotes domination over Bulgarian Orthodoxy and gained Catholic recognition in 1861 when Pope Pius IX named him Archbishop for the Bulgarians of the Byzantine Rite. He was also accepted in that capacity by the Ottoman Empire.

== Biography ==
Sokolsky was born as Todor Petrovich around 1786 in an Eastern Orthodox family in the village of Nova Mahala, today a quarter of Gabrovo. Around 1802 he became a novice in the Troyan Monastery, where he took religious vows in 1806. In the 1820s he visited Mount Athos, where he brought the collection of works containing the life of Gabrovo's Bulgarian Saint Onuphrius. On 1 May 1826 he became abbot of Kalofer Monastery. In 1832, Archimandrite Joseph Sokolsky left the Troyan Monastery and founded a monastery at a place called Falcon near the village Etar (now part of the city of Gabrovo). New monastery became known as "Sokolsky". In the 1840s in the same area Sokolsky created a "Joseph Convent". In 1836, Joseph Sokolsky also opened a school for boys. At one time in this school taught famous Bulgarian educator Neofit Bozveli. For his achievements as an Orthodox Archimandrite, Sokolsky was much revered among Orthodox Bulgarians.

In 1860 the Bulgarian national leaders and clergy campaigned for autonomy of Bulgarian Orthodox Church within the Ecumenical Patriarchate of Constantinople, but without much success. At the same time, among the Bulgarians in Istanbul, an alternative solution was proposed, in the form of union with Catholic Church. Chief advocates of such notions were Dragan Tsankov and Georgi Mirkovich.

At first, Joseph Sokolsky was a strong supporter of the movement for autonomy of the Bulgarian Orthodox Church within the Patriarchate of Constantinople, and was disappointed with Greek disrespect towards Bulgarian claims. Soon, his countryman Nicolas Sapunov attracted him to the idea of a union with the Catholic Church. In November 1860, Joseph Sokolsky moved to Constantinople, and on 30 December 1860 he became a member of the Bulgarian delegation, sent to Pope Pius IX with the request to establish a hierarchy of the Bulgarian Greek Catholic Church.

In March 1861 he went to Italy, together with deacon Raphael Popov, Dragan Tsankov and Georgi Mirkovich. Upon arrival in Rome, the delegation was received in Rome by the Pope himself. In April 1861 in the Sistine Chapel, Joseph Sokolsky was consecrated Archbishop, and appointed apostolic vicar for the Catholic Bulgarians of the Byzantine Rite. upon his return to Istanbul, he was accepted in that capacity by the authorities of Ottoman Empire. At that point, it seemed that the newly created Bulgarian Byzantine-Catholic Church would start to develop successfully.

Those events drew the attention of Russian officials in Istanbul, who feared that a union movement would have substantial influence on Bulgarians. Because of that, a plan was developed to detach Joseph Sokolsky from his community. The plan was devised by the Russian envoy, Prince Lobanov-Rostovsky, and was carried out by Petko Slaveikov who lured Sokolsky onto the Russian ship "Elbrus" that sailed from Istanbul for Odessa in June 1861.

After arriving in Odessa, Joseph Sokolsky was taken by the Imperial Russian authorities to Kiev where he stayed for sometime in the Kyiv-Pechersk Lavra. Later Sokolsky was exiled to a specifically built place for him near Holosiievo Forest (southern outskirts of Kiev, near modern Holosiivskyi National Nature Park) belonging to the Kyiv-Pechersk Lavra, where he lived until his death. The Russian government allowed him to build his own vineyard and a small garden. Sokolsky was assisted by another Bulgarian who had already lived in Kiev for quite sometime.

After the Polish uprising of 1863, in the Eparchy of Chełm–Belz (Ruthenian Uniate Church) almost all Greek Catholic priests were suspended or expelled. With the permission of the Emperor Alexander II, in 1873-74 Joseph Sokolsky visited that region several times, and a total of 72 Greek Catholic priest were ordained. Joseph Sokolsky regularly filed applications for permission to return to Bulgaria, the last of which dates from 1878, but he was always refused.

Joseph Sokolsky died on 30 September 1879.

Today the place where he lived in Kiev is known as Bolharske (Bulgarian), after the archbishop.

== See also ==
- Bulgarian Catholic Apostolic Vicariate of Constantinople
- Raphael Popov

== Sources ==
- Frazee, Charles A. (2006) [1983]. Catholics and Sultans: The Church and the Ottoman Empire 1453-1923. Cambridge: Cambridge University Press. ISBN 9780521027007.
