= Scesa Point =

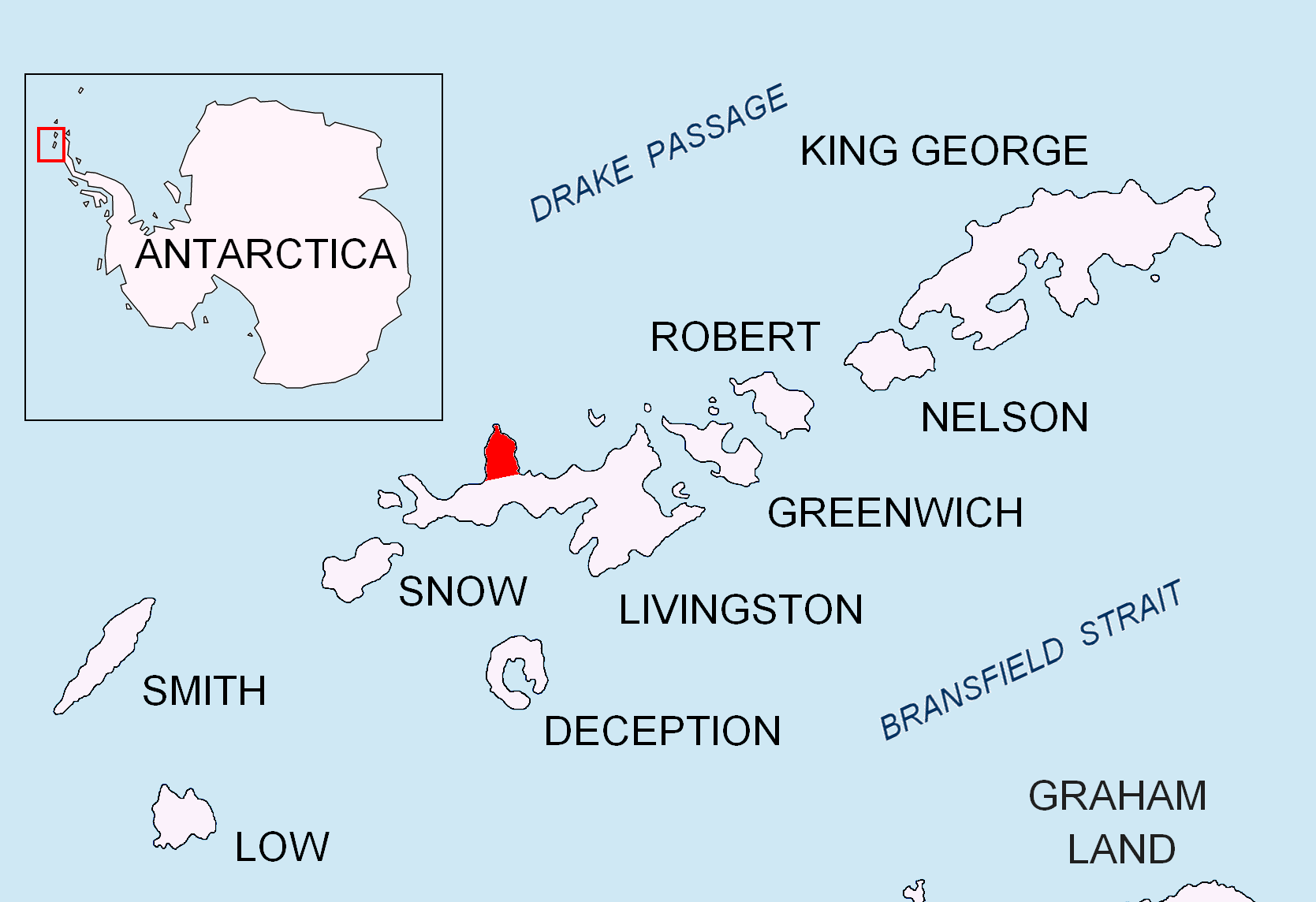
Location of Ioannes Paulus II Peninsula on Livingston Island in the South Shetland Islands

Topographic map of Livingston Island and Smith Island

Scesa Point is a rounded, low ice-free tipped point on the west coast of Ioannes Paulus II Peninsula, western Livingston Island in the South Shetland Islands, Antarctica forming the north side of the entrance to Zornitsa Cove.

The feature is named after Benjamín Scesa, a crewman of the Argentine Navy Lockheed Neptune aircraft that crashed in poor weather on the slopes of Mount Friesland on 15 September 1976.

== Location ==
Scesa Point is located at 62°32′07″S 60°50′42″W which is 6.92 km north-northeast of Rowe Point, 18 km east-northeast of Essex Point, 5.18 km south by west of Mercury Bluff and 9 km south-southwest of Cape Shirreff (British mapping in 1968 and Bulgarian in 2005, 2009 and 2017).

== Maps ==
- L.L. Ivanov et al. Antarctica: Livingston Island and Greenwich Island, South Shetland Islands. Scale 1:100000 topographic map. Sofia: Antarctic Place-names Commission of Bulgaria, 2005.
- L.L. Ivanov. Antarctica: Livingston Island and Greenwich, Robert, Snow and Smith Islands. Scale 1:120000 topographic map. Troyan: Manfred Wörner Foundation, 2009. ISBN 978-954-92032-6-4
- L. Ivanov. Antarctica: Livingston Island and Smith Island. Scale 1:100000 topographic map. Manfred Wörner Foundation, 2017. ISBN 978-619-90008-3-0
