= Bulgarian Catholic Apostolic Vicariate of Thrace =

Eastern Catholic missionary jurisdiction in Bulgaria

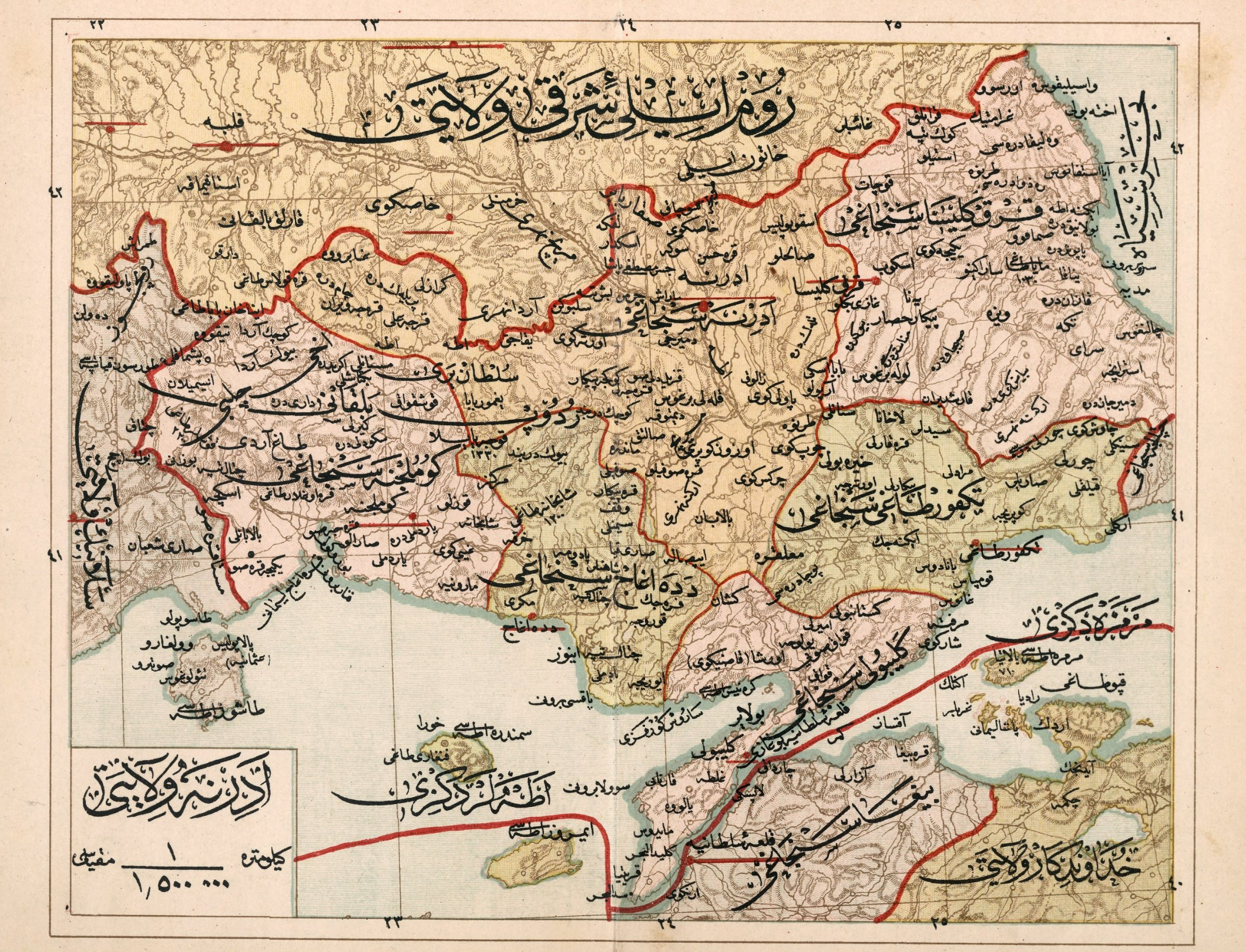
Contemporary map of Ottoman Thrace (Adrianople Vilayet) in 1907

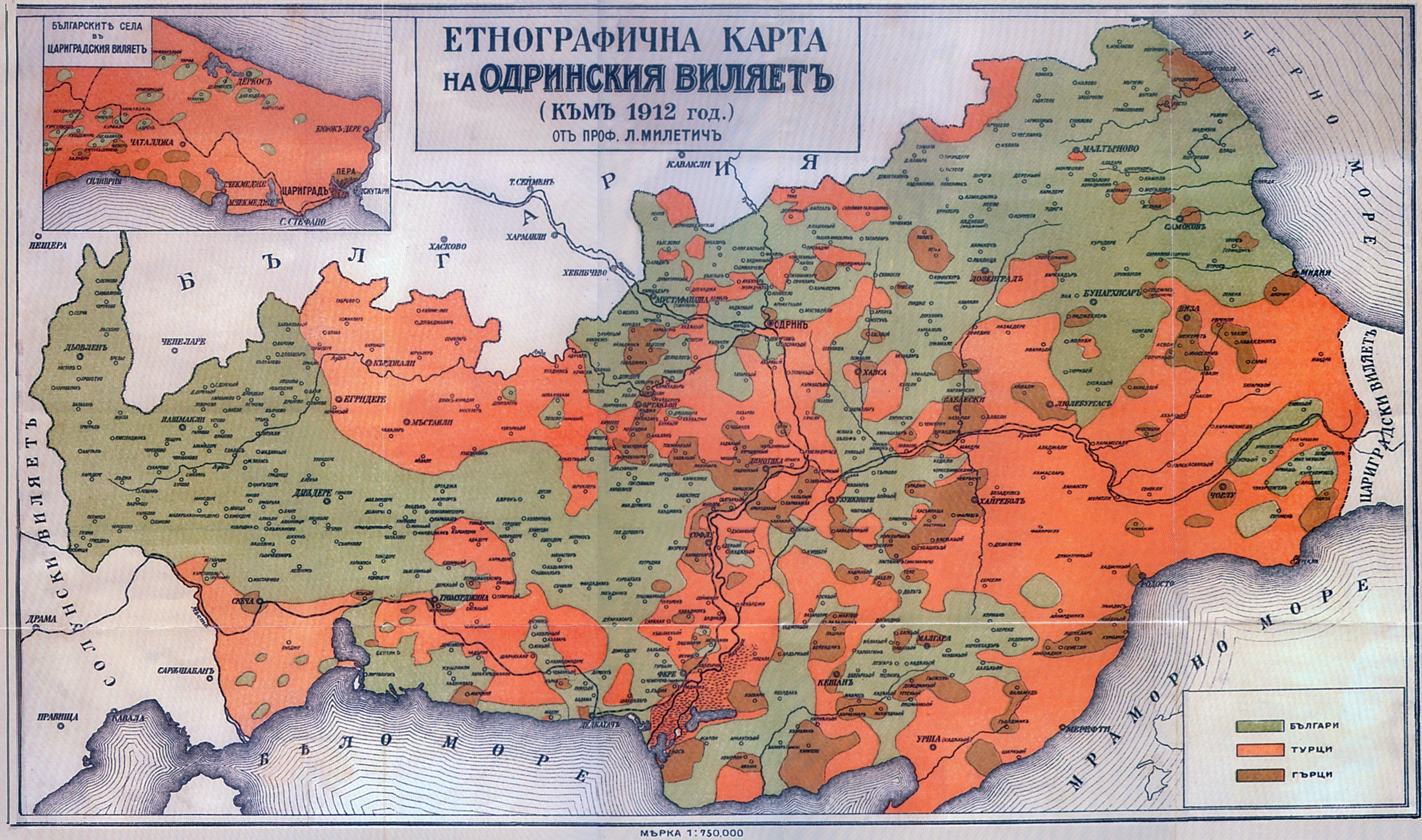
Ethnic map of Ottoman Thrace in 1912, according to Bulgarian ethnographers

The Bulgarian Catholic Apostolic Vicariate of Tracia (informally Tracia of the Bulgarians) was the second missionary, pre-diocesan jurisdiction of the Bulgarian Greek Catholic Church sui iuris (Eastern Catholic, Byzantine Rite in Bulgarian language).

As Apostolic Vicariate it was exempt, i.e. directly dependent on the Holy See, and entitled to a titular bishop.

== History ==
It was established on 7 April 1883 as Bulgarian Catholic Apostolic Vicariate of Tracia alias Hadrianopolis (after its see Adrianople, now Edirne, in Turkish Thrace) on Ottoman Turkish and Bulgarian territory in Thrace split off from the Bulgarian Catholic Apostolic Vicariate of Constantinople.

In 1926 it was suppressed, its territory like that of its sister Bulgarian Catholic Apostolic Vicariate of Macedonia and their mother Constantinople being reassigned to establish the Bulgarian Catholic Apostolic Exarchate of Sofia.

== Ordinaries ==
Apostolic Vicars of Thrace

- Michail Petkov (1883.04.10 – death 1921.05.27), Titular Bishop of Hebron (1883.04.12 – 1921.05.27)
- Apostolic Administrator Cristoforo Kondoff (1923 – 1924), no other office

== See also ==
- Catholic Church in Bulgaria

== Sources ==
- Frazee, Charles A. (2006) [1983]. Catholics and Sultans: The Church and the Ottoman Empire 1453-1923. Cambridge: Cambridge University Press. ISBN 9780521027007.
