= Michael Petkov =

- Vicar Apostolic of Tracia
- Native name: Михаил Петков
- Church: Bulgarian Greek Catholic Church
- See: Bulgarian Catholic Apostolic Vicariate of Thrace
- In office: 10 April 1883 – 27 May 1921
- Predecessor: Vicariate erected
- Successor: Vicariate suppressed
- Other post: Titular Bishop of Hebron (1883-1921)

Orders
- Consecration: 22 April 1883 by Nil Izvorov

Personal details
- Born: 24 October 1850 Adrianople, Eyalet of Adrianople, Ottoman Empire
- Died: 27 May 1921 (aged 70) Adrianople, Kingdom of Greece

Mihail Petkov (Bulgarian: Михаил Петков) (24 October 1850 – 27 May 1921) was a Bulgarian Eastern Catholic priest, member of the Uniate movement in the Ottoman Empire.

== Biography ==
Michael Petkov was born on October 24, 1850, in the city of Edirne and graduated in philosophical and theological education in Rome. In June 1873 he was ordained priest. Petkov was appointed by Bishop Raphael Popov a parish priest in the village Elya Gyunyu to Malgara where he remained about three years. Then go for treatment in Edirne, and later, in Istanbul as coadjutor of the Nil Izvorov. The reform of 1883 divided the Eastern Catholic eparchies in two. For Apostolic Vicar in Eastern Diocese was appointed and ordained bishop Mihail Petkov, who is also responsible for laymen within the principality of Bulgaria. The first obstacle to elect a young spiritual head is the difficulty to acquire Sultan pick. This permission he obtained only in 1891. In 1903 the diocese of Bishop Michael Petkov numbered 4,600 faithfuls with 20 lay priests. The beginning of the Balkan War, Bulgarian and everywhere, also in the Eastern Catholics in Thrace is associated with better hopes for freedom and join the motherland. Unfortunately, too short and deceptive. In Thrace Turks destroyed 11 villages and 3380 Uniates left homeless. More than 10,000 Eastern Catholics of the crumbling Ottoman Empire, seeking salvation through displacement from their homelands. In ubiquitous obezbalgaryavane of Eastern Thrace, Bulgaria and Edirne went Apostolic Vicar. Is established first in Sofia. Difficulties arise regarding the status of the Eastern Catholic Church and its bishops in Bulgaria. The status of an Ottoman subject of the bishop became a formal reason its legal status in Bulgaria remain outstanding longer. Despite his repeated demands to the Ministry of Foreign Affairs and Religious Affairs, the Bulgarian authorities have not given their consent to be recognized as the head of Catholics in the eastern state border. Meanwhile, Bishop Petkov take care of refugees and priests of the Diocese of Thessaloniki, which faces the same critical situation, in which in 1913 it was on the Edirne province. So under his ministry took another 11 parishes in excess of 3600 people with 13 priests. In 1914 with the help of Bishop Michael Petkov in Sofia organized the Eastern Catholic parish. On February 17, 1915, the bishop leaves Sofia and stayed in Plovdiv, where he waited until the end of the war. In 1920, already ill and still unresolved status in Bulgaria, Mihail Petkov took to his old seat in Edirne. The bishop died on May 27, 1921.
