= Metodi Stratiev =

Bulgarian Greek Catholic archbishop

Metodi Stratiev AA
- Apostolic Exarch of Sofia
- Native name: Методий Стратиев
- Church: Bulgarian Greek Catholic Church
- See: Apostolic Exarchate of Sofia
- In office: 9 March 1971 – 5 September 1975
- Predecessor: Kiril Kurtev
- Successor: Christo Proykov
- Other post: Titular Archeparch of Diocletianopolis in Thracia (1963-2006)
- Previous post: Coadjutor Apostolic Exarch of Sofia (1963-1971)

Orders
- Ordination: 26 July 1942
- Consecration: 5 September 1965 by Kiril Kurtev

Personal details
- Born: 11 January 1916 Srem, Burgas Okrug, Kingdom of Bulgaria
- Died: 12 May 2006 (aged 90)

Archbishop Metodi Stratiev AA, (secular name Nikola Dimitrov Stratiev; 11 January 1916 – 12 May 2006) was a Bulgarian Greek Catholic hierarch, of the Order of Saint Augustine, Titular Archbishop and former Exarch of Sofia Exarchate and political prisoner during the trials against Catholic clergy in Bulgaria.

== Early life and education ==
He was born on 11 January 1916 in the village of Srem. In his native village he completed primary education, then from 1928 to 1931 was still in high school at Yambol. He then studied 5 years in the French College "Saint Augustine" in Plovdiv. On 6 October 1936 he went to France to do the monastic community of Augustine-Assumptionist Fathers. On 21 November 1936 beginning novitiate receives robe and new monastic name of Metodi. Both studied at the Seminary for foreign missions Nozeroa. In the period 1937-1942 he studied philosophy and theology at the Catholic Institute in Paris, which is a branch of the Sorbonne. On 26 July 1942 he was ordained an Augustine priest by Bishop Pius Neve, AA (1877–1946).

== Career ==
At the end of July 1943, Father Metodi returned to Bulgaria. Became rector of the Ecclesiastical Saint Joseph college and taught French literature in Saint Augustine college in Plovdiv. Develops active journalistic work in the Bulgarian Catholic press. On 18 May 1946 he was moved by the bishop to St. Cyril and Methodius parish in Yambol, where he became parish priest. However, it is trusted of the pension of the Augustino-Assumptionist Fathers Fathers in the city to him. On 11 July 1952, after the evening, Divine Liturgy invaded Yambol church militia and civilian agents of State Security and arrested Father Metodi. With handcuffed and tied his eyes, he was taken immediately to Sofia. After days of beatings, daily interrogations, bunker, physical torture and psychological harassment, the judicial farce, played by the People's Court from 29 September to 3 October 1952 Father Metodi Stratiev was sentenced to 14 years imprisonment and total confiscation of property. Jail in Pleven, Belene camp, Pazardzhik Prison, careers and Ognyanovo Samovodenskata quarry. In his work, Father Metodi reduced his sentence from 14 to 11 years and was released in 1963. On 28 April 1963 he was nominated for bishop coadjutor of Exarchate of Sofia and Titular Bishop of Diocletianopolis in Thracia.

It was not until 5 September 1965 was consecrated bishop by Exarch Cyril Kurtev. After the death of Bishop Kurtev Bishop Metodi managed Apostolic Exarchate of Sofia from 9 March 1971 to 5 September 1995, when Pope John Paul II accepted his resignation. On 18 December 1993 he was nominated Archbishop ad personam.

== Death ==
On 12 May 2006, after a short illness, he died at 21:54. Funeral service took place on 14 May 2006 by Exarch Christo Proykov in the presence of Bishop Gheorghi Ivanov Jovcev and Apostolic Nuncio Archbishop Giuseppe Leanza at the Cathedral of Assumption in Sofia. He was buried the same day in the Catholic plots in Central Sofia Cemetery.
