= Macedonian Apostolic Vicariate of the Bulgarians =

Eastern Catholic missionary jurisdiction in the Balkans

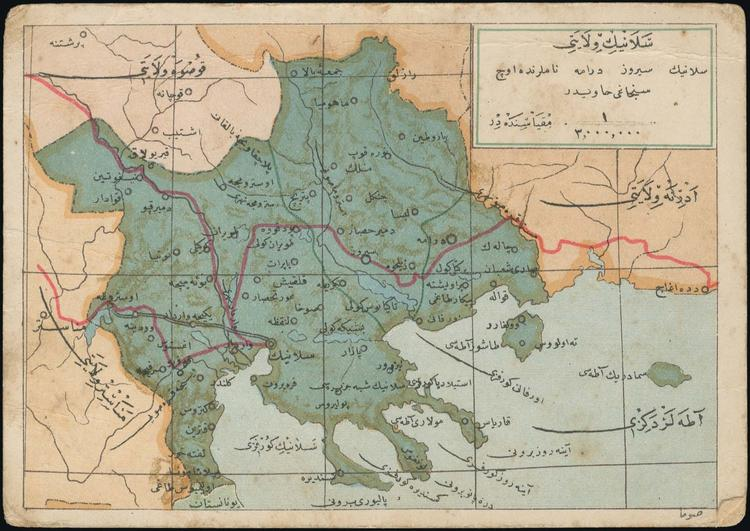
Contemporary map of Ottoman Macedonia (Salonica Vilayet) c. 1900

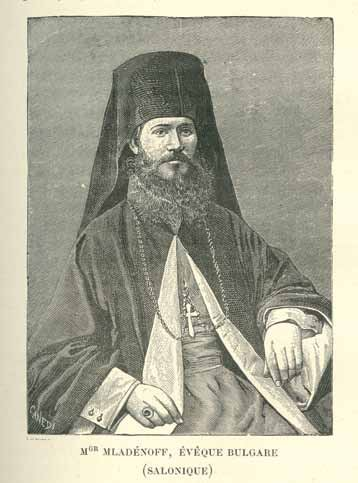
Bishiop Lazar Mladenov, Byzantine-Catholic Apostolic Vicar of Macedonia (1883–1895)

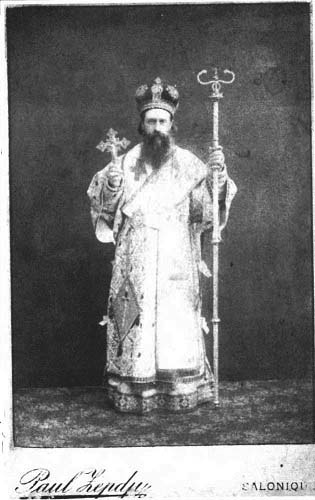
Bishiop Epiphanius Shanov, Byzantine-Catholic Apostolic Vicar of Macedonia (1895–1922)

The Macedonian Apostolic Vicariate of the Bulgarians (Latin: Apostolicus Vicariatus Macedoniaensis Bulgarorum or Vicariatus Apostolicus pro Bulgaris Catholicis Macedoniae), informally Macedonia of the Bulgarians, was a missionary, pre-diocesan jurisdiction of the Bulgarian Greek Catholic Church sui iuris (Eastern Catholic, Byzantine Rite in Bulgarian language).

As an Apostolic Vicariate it was exempt, i.e. directly dependent on the Holy See, and entitled to a titular bishop.

== History ==
In the middle of the 19th century, historical region of Macedonia was under Ottoman rule, and its major part was organized as Salonica Eyalet. Among Eastern Orthodox Slavic population in European provinces of the Ottoman Empire, that was under the ecclesiastical jurisdiction of the Ecumenical Patriarchate of Constantinople, there was a strong movement for internal ecclesiastical autonomy, and since Greek hierarchy was reluctant to fulfill those demands, a fraction of population left Eastern Orthodoxy and joined Eastern Catholicism. In 1859, the "Union of Kukush" occurred among local Bulgarians who converted from Eastern Orthodoxy to Eastern Catholicism, that subsequently led to the creation of a particular ecclesiastical jurisdiction. In 1861, Bulgarian Catholic Apostolic Vicariate of Constantinople was created for the Eastern-Catholic Bulgarians of the Byzantine Rite in European provinces of the Ottoman Empire, including the region of Macedonia.

Under the Treaty of Berlin (1878), entire territory of Macedonia was left under Ottoman rule, as Salonica Vilayet. Since Ottoman government was obligated to allow more liberty for of all Christian denominations in the region, an opportunity arose for reorganization of religious institutions of local Eastern Catholic of Byzantine Rite. In 1883, a Byzantine-Catholic Apostolic Vicariate of Macedonia was created, cowering the administrative territory of Salonica Vilayet. The new Apostolic Vicariate was split off from the jurisdiction of the Bulgarian Catholic Apostolic Vicariate of Constantinople.

In 1912, Ottoman rule over Macedonia ended, and the region was divided between Greece, Serbia and Bulgaria. During Balkan Wars (1912-1913) and First World War (1914-1918) the region was heavily afflicted, and administrative structure of the Vicariate was almost destroyed. From 1922 to 1926, the remains of local vicariates of Macedonia, Thrace and Constantinople were gradually suppressed and reorganized. Parts that remained under Greek and Serbian rule were incorporated into new ecclesiastical structures for Eastern Catholics. Northern parts of the Vicariate that belonged to the Kingdom of Serbs, Croats and Slovenes (Yugoslavia) were transferred to the jurisdiction of the Byzantine Catholic Eparchy of Križevci, while the eastern parts of the Vicariate, including major part of the Bulgarian Catholic Apostolic Vicariate of Thrace (Hadrianopolis) was reestablished as the Bulgarian Catholic Apostolic Exarchate of Sofia, which thus became the only diocese, covering the entire particular church.

== Ordinaries ==
Byzantine Catholic Apostolic Vicars of Macedonia:

- Lazar Mladenov, Lazarists (C.M.) (d. 1918), Titular Bishop of Satala, Apostolic Vicar (1883–1895)
- Epiphanius Shanov (d. 1940), Titular Bishop of Livias, Apostolic Vicar (1895–1922)

== See also ==
- Macedonian Byzantine-Catholic Church
- Bulgarian Byzantine-Catholic Church
- Greek Byzantine-Catholic Church

== Sources ==
- Frazee, Charles A. (2006) [1983]. Catholics and Sultans: The Church and the Ottoman Empire 1453-1923. Cambridge: Cambridge University Press. ISBN 9780521027007.
