= Dripchevo =

Dripchevo Дрипчево
- Village
- Location within Bulgaria
- Coordinates: 41°59′N 26°13′E
- Country: Bulgaria
- Province: Haskovo Province
- Municipality: Harmanli

Government
  - Mayor: Mihail Liskov

Population (2026)
  - Total: 0
- Time zone: UTC+2 (EET)
  - Summer (DST): UTC+3 (EEST)

Dripchevo (Bulgarian: Дрипчево) is a village in the municipality of Harmanli, in Haskovo Province, in southern Bulgaria. It is located on the southern slope of the Sakar Mountain.
