= Raphael Popov =

Bulgarian bishop (1830–1876)

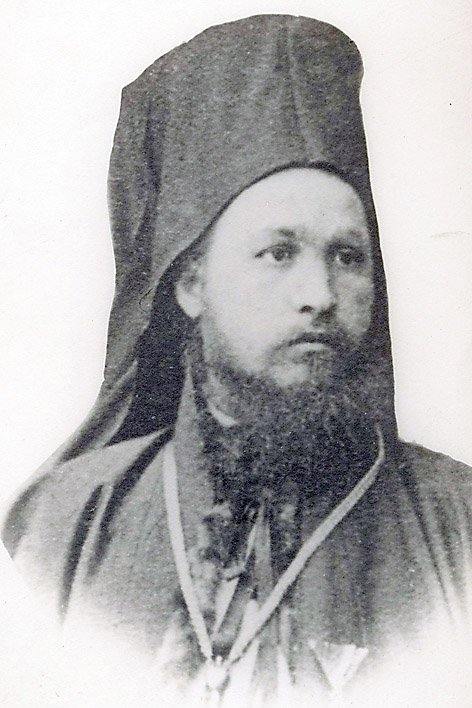
Raphael Popov (1830–1876), Bulgarian Byzantine-Catholic Bishop

Raphael Popov (Bulgarian: Рафаел Попов, born in Strelcha, 15 November 1830 – died in Edirne, 6 March 1876) was a Bulgarian Byzantine-Catholic bishop and one of the leaders of the Bulgarian national revival. Originally he was an Eastern Orthodox deacon, but converted in 1860 to Catholicism. In 1865, he became an Apostolic administrator of the Bulgarian Byzantine Catholic Church in the Ottoman Empire and was ordained as bishop.

== Biography ==
Raphael Popov was born on 15 November 1830 in Strelcha, to an Eastern Orthodox family. In the period from 1849 to 1851 he was a teacher in the village of Popintsi. From 1851, he taught in Plovdiv, and in the next year, in the village of Poibrene. On August 24, 1854, he took monastic orders in Karlukovo monastery near Pleven. He taught for three years in Berkovitsa. In early January 1859 he went to the Rila Monastery and accepted the offer of Avksentiy Veleshki to be ordained a deacon. In December the same year both arrived in Constantinople. On April 3, 1860, he served with Ilarion during the Easter action, when Bulgarians rejected the name of the Greek Patriarch of Constantinople. On December 30, 1860, Popov joined the Catholic Church. He participated in the Bulgarian Uniates delegation to the Pope Pius IX in the spring of 1861, when Joseph Sokolsky was ordained Bulgarian Byzantine-Catholic Archbishop.

After the detachment of Joseph Sokolsky for Russia in summer 1861, Raphael Popov remained one of the main leaders of Catholic Bulgarians of Byzantine Rite in Ottoman Empire. He was ordained priest in August 1861 and became Archimandrite in 1862. Since it was probable that Joseph Sokolsky will not be returning from Russia, Rafael Popov was elected by local community in 1863 and recognized as "vicar and popular leader of the Bulgarians united with the Roman Catholic Church" by the Ottoman authorities on February 10, 1864. Soon after that, on March 28, 1865, Rafael Popov was appointed Apostolic Administrator of the Bulgarian Byzantine-Catholic Church and its vicariate in Constantinople. On November 19, 1865, he was ordained a bishop in the cathedral church "St. John Chrysostom" in Constantinople.

At the beginning of next year, he settled in Edirne. As a bishop he developed vigorous activity. Two years later, due to the great need of priests he ordained his brother a priest and sent him to take care of the parish in Pokrovan. In April 1866 Rafail Popov undertook an extensive tour in Macedonia and Thrace. In 1869-1870 he undertook a journey to Rome to take part in meetings of the First Vatican Council, which proclaimed papal infallibility in matters of faith.

Rafail Popov served as bishop and administrator of Bulgarian Catholic Apostolic Vicariate for 11 years. His successful mission among Catholic Bulgarians of the Byzantine Rite worried opponents of the Bulgarian national revival. He died on March 6, 1876, and was buried in the side altar of Edirne Eastern Catholic Episcopal cathedral "St. Elias", where he served during his lifetime.

He was succeeded by bishop Nil Izvorov.

== See also ==
- Bulgarian Catholic Apostolic Vicariate of Constantinople
- Joseph Sokolsky

== Sources ==
- Frazee, Charles A. (2006) [1983]. Catholics and Sultans: The Church and the Ottoman Empire 1453-1923. Cambridge: Cambridge University Press. ISBN 9780521027007.
