= Srem (village) =

- Village
- Location within Bulgaria
- Coordinates: 42°03′N 26°29′E
- Country: Bulgaria
- Province: Haskovo Province
- Municipality: Topolovgrad
- Time zone: UTC+2 (EET)
  - Summer (DST): UTC+3 (EEST)

Srem is a village in the municipality of Topolovgrad, in Haskovo Province, in southern Bulgaria. It was known as "Esenli" (Esenlü and Alabayır at 16th-century Ottoman records) during Ottoman rule.
