= Cathedral of the Dormition, Sofia =

Cathedral of the Dormition
- Катедрала Успение Богородично
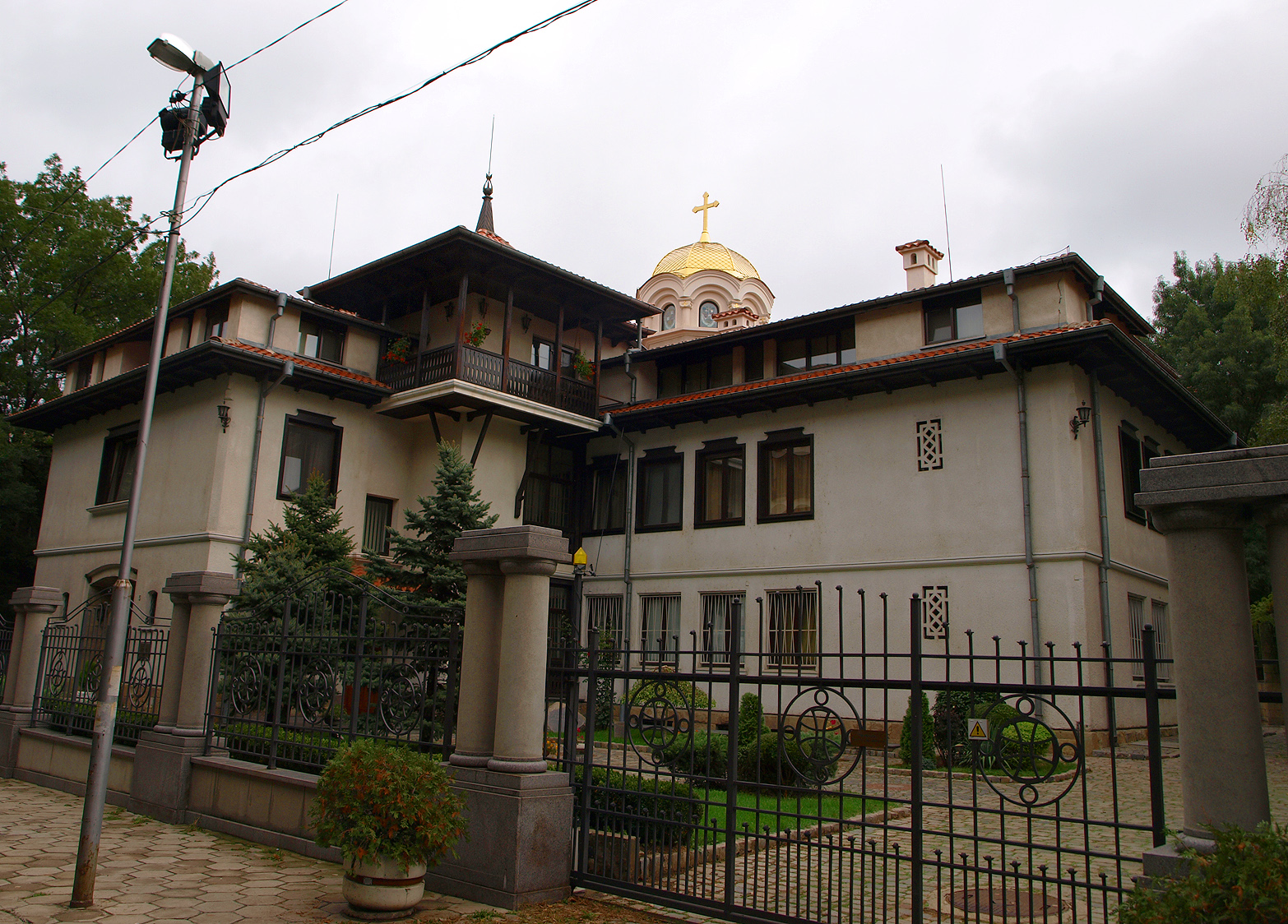
- Cathedral of the Dormition
- 42°41′28.2″N 23°18′47.2″E
- Location: Sofia
- Country: Bulgaria
- Denomination: Bulgarian Catholic Church

Architecture
- Completed: 27 August 1924

The Cathedral of the Dormition (Bulgarian: Катедрала Успение Богородично ), also called Cathedral of the Assumption of the Blessed Virgin Mary, is a Catholic church of Bulgarian (Byzantine) rite that is the mother church of the Bulgarian Greek Catholic Eparchy of Sofia, located in the city of Sofia, in Bulgaria.

The church was built in 1924 in order to meet the religious needs of Eastern rite Catholics in Sofia. The construction of the church had been possible thanks to the efforts of Monsignor Vikenti Peev, the bishop of the diocese of Sofia and Plovdiv and personal donations sent by Popes Benedict XV and Pius XI. On 17 September 1922, the first stone was laid. The church was designed by an architect named Heinrich as the first concrete church in Sofia. The church was completed on 27 August 1924 in what was then the outskirts of the city.

In 2002 the cathedral was visited by Pope John Paul II during his apostolic travel to Bulgaria.

== See also ==
- Roman Catholicism in Bulgaria
- Cathedral of the Dormition (in Russia)
