= Bulgarian Greek Catholic Church =

Eastern Catholic church

Coordinates: 42.6913°N 23.3134°E

- Classification: Eastern Catholic
- Structure: Eparchy
- Pope: Leo XIV
- Bishop of Sofia: Petko Valov
- Associations: Congregation for the Oriental Churches
- Region: Bulgaria
- Language: Bulgarian
- Liturgy: Byzantine Rite
- Headquarters: Cathedral of the Dormition Sofia, Bulgaria
- Congregations: 13
- Members: 2000
- Ministers: 21
- Official website: http://www.kae-bg.org

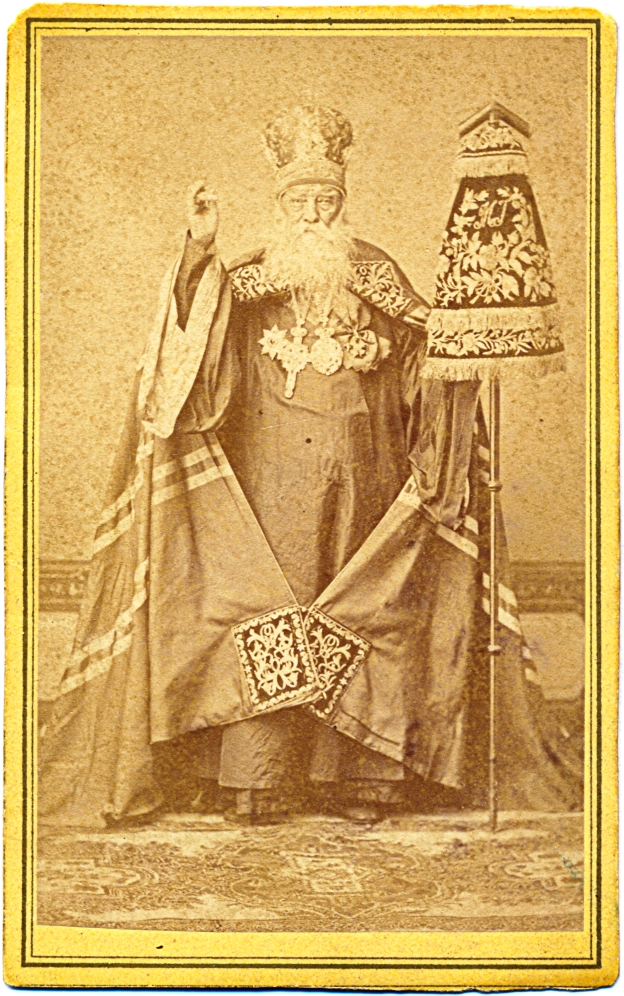
Archbishop Joseph Sokolsky, November 1872

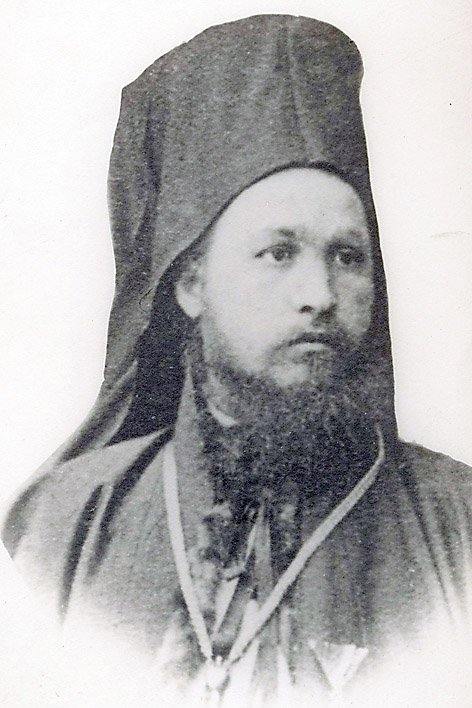
Raphael Popov (1830–1876), Bulgarian Byzantine-Catholic Bishop

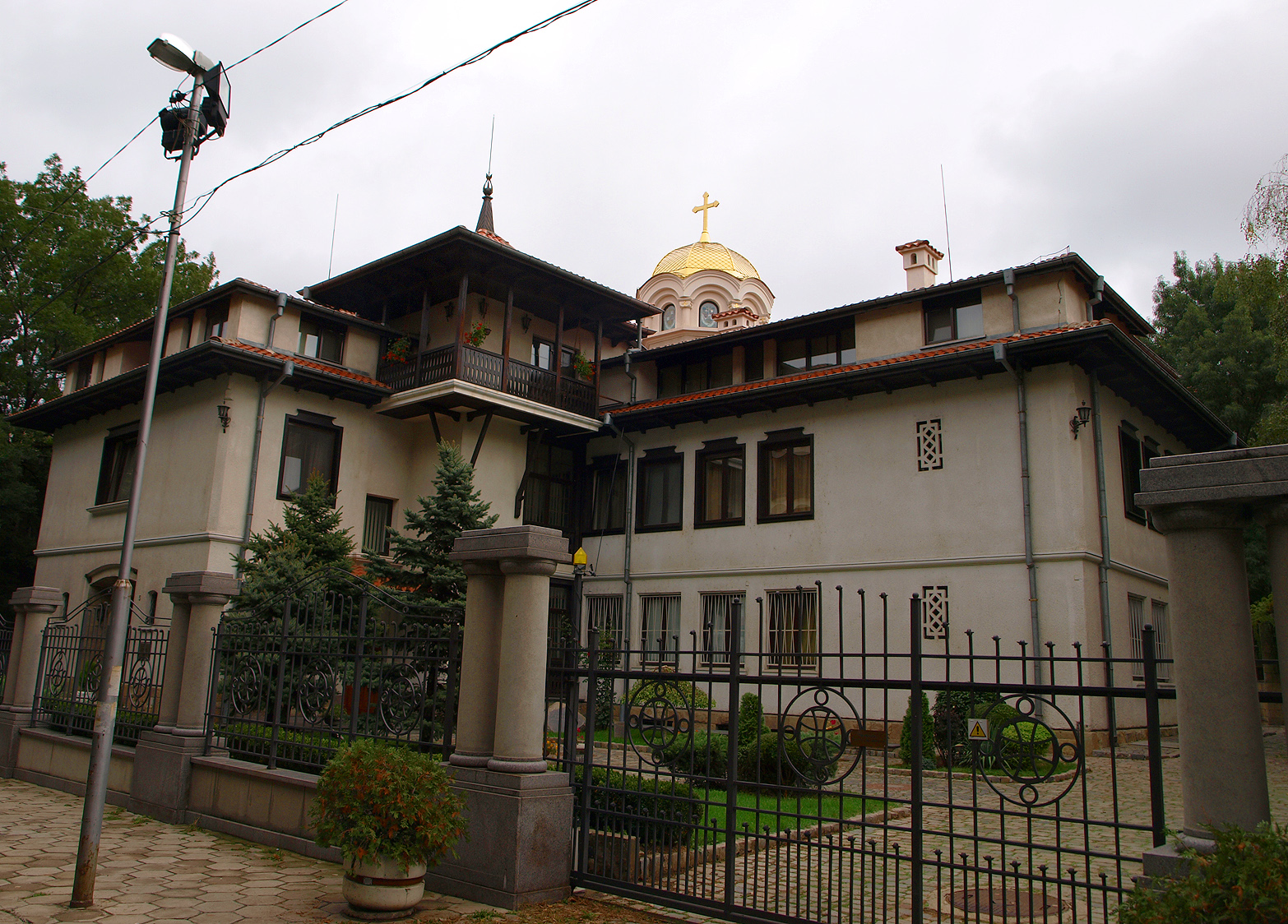
Headquarters of the Bulgarian Greek Catholic Church in Sofia, Bulgaria

The Bulgarian Greek Catholic Church (Note: Bulgarian: Църква на съединените с Рим българи; Latin: Ecclesiae Graecae Catholico Bulgarica), sometimes called, in reference to its Byzantine Rite, the Bulgarian Byzantine Catholic Church) is a sui iuris ("autonomous") Eastern Catholic church based in Bulgaria. As a particular church of the Catholic Church, it is in full communion with the Holy See. The church's liturgical usage is that of the Byzantine Rite in the Bulgarian language. The church is organized as a single eparchy—the Bulgarian Greek Catholic Eparchy of Sofia.

== History ==
=== Middle Ages ===
Under Knyaz Boris (853–889) the Bulgarians accepted Christianity in its Byzantine form, with the liturgy celebrated in Church Slavonic. For a variety of reasons, Boris became interested in converting to Christianity and undertook to do that at the hands of Western clergymen to be supplied by Louis the German in 863. However, late in the same year, the Byzantine Empire invaded Bulgaria during a period of famine and natural disasters. Taken by surprise, Boris was forced to sue for peace and agreed to convert to Christianity according to the eastern rites. His successor Symeon the Great (893–927) proclaimed an autonomous Bulgarian Patriarchate in 917, which won recognition from Constantinople in 927 and lasted until the fall of the First Bulgarian Empire in 1018. In 1186 the Bulgarian state regained its independence. Pope Innocent III had written to tsar Kaloyan, inviting him to unite his church with the Catholic Church, as early as 1199. Wanting to bear the title of Emperor and to restore the prestige, wealth and size of the First Bulgarian Empire, Kaloyan responded in 1202. In this political maneuver, he requested that Pope Innocent III bestow on him the imperial crown. Kaloyan also wanted the papacy to recognize the head of the Bulgarian church as a patriarch. The pope was not willing to make concessions on that scale, and when his envoy, Cardinal Leo, arrived in Bulgaria, he anointed the Archbishop Vasilij of Tărnovo as Primate of Bulgarians. Kaloyan only received a Uniate crown, but no imperial crown. Meanwhile, in an attempt to foster an alliance with Kaloyan, the Byzantine Emperor Alexios III Angelos recognized his imperial title and promised him patriarchal recognition. In 1235 the Patriarch of Constantinople recognized the independence of the Bulgarian church and the right of its leader to the patriarchal title. The Ottoman conquest of 1393 put an end to that patriarchate, whose territory was reunited with that of Constantinople. In the succeeding centuries the Bulgarian church was gradually Hellenized: Greek was used in the liturgy, and the bishops were ethnic Greeks.

=== Uniat movements ===
The rise of nationalism in the 19th century brought opposition to this situation. In the 19th century, there were three main Uniat movements in the then Bulgarians populated lands. They were connected to the nationalist emancipation from the Greek-dominated Patriarchate of Constantinople and its pro-Greek influence over the Slavic population living in the Thracian and Macedonian lands. The movement for union with Rome initially won some 60,000 adherents, but, as a result of the Sultan's establishment in 1870 of the Bulgarian Exarchate, at least three quarters of these returned to Orthodoxy by the end of the 19th century. The clergy's numerous shifts from the Orthodox to the Catholic Church and vice versa should not be viewed only as personal whims. They are symptomatic of the foreign powers’ game that the clergy got involved after the June 1878 Berlin Treaty, which left Macedonia and Thrace within the Ottoman Empire (after it had been given to Bulgaria with the March 1878 San Stefano Treaty). Thus, in the interplay between the Orthodox and the Uniat doctrine, Bulgaria supported the Orthodox Exarchate, and Russia supported Bulgaria. The Greek-dominated Patriarchate of Constantinople supported the Greek side. France and the Habsburg Empire supported the Uniats. The support of the Habsburg Empire increased only after 1878. The Ottoman Empire's attitude was ambivalent – sometimes supporting, sometimes opposing the Uniat movement, depending on how it had to balance its own interests in the game with the Great Powers.

=== First Uniat movement ===
This is the background of the approaches that some influential Bulgarians made to Rome in 1859–1861, in the hope that union with Rome would gain their church the freedom they felt Constantinople was denying them. The leading figure of the Uniat movement was the Bulgarian merchant Dragan Tsankov, who had the support of Catholic France. He published the newspaper "Bulgaria" in Constantinople, in which he advocated a union with the Pope. It criticized Russia for its negative stance on the Bulgarian "church question" and published historical documents on the good connections between the Catholic Church and the Bulgarian kings in medieval times. The First Uniat movement originated in two centers: Kukush and Constantinople. In 1859, Kukush citizens wrote a letter to the Pope, in which they acknowledged his administrative and spiritual leadership. In return, they demanded that no changes should be introduced to their Eastern rites of worship and that they would be the ones to choose their bishops and lower clergy, with the approval of the Pope. The letter stated that the teachers at the church schools are to be chosen by the domestic clergy and the education is to be pursued in the Bulgarian language and its "national alphabet". In 1861, archimandrite Joseph Sokolsky led a delegation to Rome, where he was received by Pope Pius IX. The pope ordained him as the archbishop for Bulgarian Catholics of the Byzantine rite on 8 April 1861. The new archbishop was associated with the Bulgarian nationalist cause. However, we was recognized in his new capacity by the Sublime Porte. However, he was almost immediately removed on a Russian ship and held in Kiev for the remainder of his life. By June 1861, there was no-one in Constantinople who could perform the Bulgarian Uniate services. This situation was not remedied until 1863 when Raphael Popov was elected as bishop centered in Adrianople. At the same year a Bulgarian Uniate Gymnasium at Adrianople was founded. The First Uniat movement spread into several towns and villages in Macedonia and Thrace, but they did not yield any concrete results. The reasons for the failure of the First Uniat movement could be found in the political character of the movements, rather than in the population's deep religious devotion. The people demanded its domestic clergy. They received it first through the patriarchate, and then through the Bulgarian Exarchate, which was finally established in 1870.

=== Second Uniat movement ===
The Second Uniat movement started again in Kukush. In 1874, Nil Izvorov, the Bulgarian Orthodox bishop of Kukush, wrote a letter to the Bulgarian Uniat Bishop in Constantinople, Raphael Popov, saying that the will of the people in Macedonia was to join the Bulgarian Uniat church. After that he sent a letter to the Pope as well, asking him for a union. His attempt of a union was successful, and in the same year he held services in his new capacity of a Uniat Catholic bishop. There are several interpretations of the reasons behind this union. Some authors stress Izvorov's personal motivation to go for a union. Two months after, Izvorov arrived in Kukush as an Orthodox bishop, he was called back to Constantinople by the patriarchate and the Russian diplomatic services. Looking for a way to remain in Macedonia, he first approached some Anglican missionaries, but he did not get any support from them. Only after that, he turned to the Lazarists in Salonica and then to bishop Popov in Constantinople. Another researchers argued that Izvorov was not happy with his own position in the Exarchate, but added that the population too was not happy with the division of the local dioceses by the patriarchate and the Bulgarian Exarchate and mistrusted both of them. That is why the ordinary people had an interest to join the Catholic Church. Historical sources show that the Ottoman government banned Izvorov from entering Kukush for several years. Bishop Popov took over his duties in Kukush, but in 1876 he died under unknown circumstances. In the same year Izvorov was promoted to be the Administering Bishop of all Uniat Bulgarians, directly subordinated to the Apostolic Delegate in Constantinople. After that he resumed his duties in Macedonia. That year, he became active once again in Central Macedonia, based at Kukush. In one five-year period, there were 57 Catholic villages, whilst the Bulgarian uniate schools in the Vilayet of Thessaloniki reached 64, including the Bulgarian Uniate Gymnasium at Thessaloniki. Several years later in 1883, he was promoted to Archbishop of all Uniat Bulgarians and went to Constantinople. As of 1883, there were already two apostolic vicars. Bishop Michail Petkov in Adrianople was responsible to Thrace and bishop Lazar Mladenov in Salonica to Macedonia, both subordinated to the archbishop Nil Izvorov in Constantinople. Earlier on the followers of Catholicism of the Eastern Rites had a joint hierarchy. In 1884 Izvorov went back to the Bulgarian Orthodox Church. The personality of Bishop Mladenov was not less controversial than that of Bishop Izvorov. After the High Porte cancelled his accreditation as Bishop on the demand of the French Consul in Salonica in 1894, Mladenov also turned to the Bulgarian Exarchate. Then he returned to the Uniate church. Nevertheless, this was the end of his career, he stayed in a monastery until the end of his life.

=== Third Uniat movement ===
By the end of the 19th century, the Bulgarian Greek Catholic Church in Macedonia was based in Kukush with Epiphany Shanov as Bishop after Mladenov's excommunication in 1895. The other Vicariat was that of the Thrace. It was led by Mihail Mirov, who was proclaimed as also Administering Bishop of all Uniat Bulgarians, with sead in Constantinople as of 1907. In 1893, the Internal Macedonian-Adrianople Revolutionary Organization emerged as the main Bulgarian factor in the Macedonian and Thracian lands. In the late 1890s, IMARO was extremely anti-Catholic. On its part, the Catholic Church did not support IMARO, because it was against any revolutionary movements in the Ottoman Empire. This attitude changed for a short period of time after the 1903 Ilinden-Preobrazhenie uprising. The Ottoman terror following the failure of the uprising prompted the Bulgarian Exarchate and the Bulgarian Greek Catholic Church alike to embark on the same mission: helping the people to cope with the tragedy. However, this rapprochement was short-lived. After 1903, the IMARO revolutionaries and the exarchate continued to act against the Catholic Church. The immediate effect of the partition of the Ottoman Empire during the Balkan Wars was the anti-Bulgarian campaign in areas under Serbian and Greek rule. The Serbians expelled Bulgarian churchmen. The Greeks burned Kukush, the center of Bulgarian politics and culture. Bulgarian language was prohibited, and its surreptitious use, whenever detected, was ridiculed or punished. The Ottomans managed to keep the Adrianople region, where the whole Thracian Bulgarian population was put to total ethnic cleansing by the Young Turks' army. As a result of the 1912–1913 Balkan Wars and the 1914–1918 First World War, many Bulgarians fled from the territories of present-day Greece, North Macedonia and Turkey to what is now Bulgaria.

=== The Bulgarian Greek Catholic Church since the First World War ===
In 1926, an apostolic exarchate was established in Sofia for the pastoral care of the Byzantine Catholics in Bulgaria. This was arranged largely with the help of Archbishop Angelo Roncalli, the future Pope John XXIII, who in 1925 was named Apostolic Visitator and, later, Apostolic Delegate for Bulgaria, where he stayed until 1934. During the Second World War Bulgaria occupied the bigger part of Macedonia and Western Thrace. In 1941, the Uniat parishes went under the jurisdiction of the Apostolic Exarchate in Sofia. Many of the clergymen and the Euharistinki sisters who had found refuge in Bulgaria earlier, returned to Macedonia and Thrace and resumed their work until the end of the war, when Bulgaria lost these territories again.

Unlike other Communist regimes in Eastern Europe, the Communist government that took power in Bulgaria after World War II did not abolish the Byzantine Catholic Church, but did subject it to severe religious persecution which is said to have been somewhat eased after the election of Pope John XXIII on 28 October 1958.

The church was elevated from an apostolic exarchate to a full eparchy by Pope Francis on 12 October 2019.

== Primates ==
- Apostolic Vicariate of the Bulgarians (1860 – 1883) (Apostolicus Vicariatus Bulgarorum)
  - Archbishop Joseph Sokolsky (14 April 1861 – 18 June 1861)
  - Archimandrite/parish priest Petar Arabadzhiysky (1861 – 1863)
  - Bishop Raphael Popov (14 March 1864 – 18 November 1865 as an Apostolic administrator, 19 November 1865 – 23 February 1876 as a bishop)
  - Bishop Nil Izvorov (21 September 1876 – 6 April 1883)
- Constantinople Archdiocese of the Bulgarians (1883 – 1926) (Archidioecesis Constantinopolitanus Bulgarorum)
  - Archbishop Nil Izvorov (7 April 1883 – 3 July 1895)
  - Archbishop Michael Mirov (4 February 1907 – 17 August 1923)
    - Macedonian Apostolic Vicariate of the Bulgarians centered in Thessaloniki (1883 – 1926) (Apostolicus Vicariatus Macedoniaensis Bulgarorum)
      - Bishop Lazar Mladenov (12 June 1883 – 31 October 1894)
      - Bishop Epiphanius Shanov (23 July 1895 – 17 December 1921)
      - Archimandrite Christophor Kondov (17 December 1921 – 6 January 1924) – Apostolic administrator
      - Archimandrite Josaphat Kozarov (20 February 1924 – 3 November 1925) – Apostolic pro-administrator
    - Thrace Apostolic Vicariate of the Bulgarians centered in Adrianople (1883 – 1926) (Apostolicus Vicariatus Thraciae Bulgarorum)
      - Bishop Michael Petkov (7 April 1883 – 27 May 1921)
      - Archimandrite Christophor Kondov (25 June 1921 – 6 January 1924) – Apostolic administrator
      - Archimandrite Josaphat Kozarov (20 February 1924 – 3 November 1925) – Apostolic pro-administrator
      - Exarch Kiril Kurtev (23 September 1925 – 24 July 1926) – Apostolic administrator
- Sophian Apostolic Exarchate (1926 – 2019)
  - Bishop Kiril Kurtev (25 July 1926 – 30 May 1941)
  - Bishop Ivan Garufalov (6 July 1942 – 7 August 1951)
  - Bishop Kiril Kurtev (7 August 1951 – 9 March 1971)
  - Archbishop Metodi Stratiev (9 March 1971 – 5 September 1995)
  - Bishop Christo Proykov (5 September 1995 – 11 October 2019)
- Sophian Eparchy of Saint John the 23rd (since 2019)
  - Bishop Christo Proykov (11 October 2019 - 8 April 2024)
  - Bishop Petko Valov since 8 April 2024

== Structure ==
At the end of 2004, the apostolic exarchate of Sofia numbered 10,000 Catholics in 21 parishes, under the care of five diocesan and sixteen religious priests, with 17 other male religious and 41 female religious. The cathedral church of the eparchy is the Cathedral of the Dormition (Катедрала Успение Богородично), in Bulgaria's capital Sofia. The incumbent eparch is Christo Proykov.

Like other Eastern Catholic Churches, the Bulgarian Byzantine Catholic Church ordains married men to the priesthood.

== See also ==
- Bulgarian Catholic Apostolic Vicariate of Thrace
- Bulgarian Catholic Apostolic Vicariate of Macedonia
- Bulgarian Catholic Apostolic Vicariate of Constantinople
- Bulgarian Orthodox Church

== Sources ==
- Frazee, Charles A. (2006) [1983]. Catholics and Sultans: The Church and the Ottoman Empire 1453–1923. Cambridge: Cambridge University Press.
- A concise history of the Bulgarian Uniate Church (From its official site, in Bulgarian)
- M. Spinka, A History of Christianity in the Balkans (Chicago, Ill. 1933)
- V. N. Zlatarski, Istoră na Bŭlgarskata Dŭrzhava, 3 v. in 4 (Sofia 1918–40)
- D. Tsuchlev, Istorîâ na Bŭlgarskata Tsŭrkva, 2 v. (Sofia 1910—)
- S. Tsankov, Die Bulgarische Orthodoxe Kirche seit der Befreiung bis zur Gegenwart (Sofia 1939). i. sofranov, Histoire du mouvement bulgare vers l'Église catholique au XIX e siècle (Rome 1960)
- A. Cronia, Saggi di letteratura Bulgara antica (Rome 1936)
- R. Roberson, The Eastern Christian Churches: A Brief Survey, 6th ed (Rome 1999).
