= Zornitsa Cove =

Cove in the South Shetland Islands, Antarctica

Location of Livingston Island in the South Shetland Islands.

Topographic map of Livingston Island and Smith Island

Zornitsa Cove (Bulgarian: залив Зорница, ‘Zaliv Zornitsa’ \'za-liv zor-'ni-tsa\) is the 7 km wide cove indenting for 3.1 km the north coast of Livingston Island in the South Shetland Islands, Antarctica. Entered between Rowe Point and Scesa Point on the west side of Ioannes Paulus II Peninsula. Bulgarian mapping in 2009.

The cove is named after the settlements of Zornitsa in southeastern, northeastern and southwestern Bulgaria.

== Location ==
Zornitsa Cove is centered at 62°34′10″S 60°50′50″W. British mapping in 1968, Spanish in 1991, and Bulgarian in 2005 and 2009.

== Maps ==
- L.L. Ivanov et al. Antarctica: Livingston Island and Greenwich Island, South Shetland Islands. Scale 1:100000 topographic map. Sofia: Antarctic Place-names Commission of Bulgaria, 2005.
- L.L. Ivanov. Antarctica: Livingston Island and Greenwich, Robert, Snow and Smith Islands. Scale 1:120000 topographic map. Troyan: Manfred Wörner Foundation, 2010. ISBN 978-954-92032-9-5 (First edition 2009. ISBN 978-954-92032-6-4)
- Antarctic Digital Database (ADD). Scale 1:250000 topographic map of Antarctica. Scientific Committee on Antarctic Research (SCAR). Since 1993, regularly updated.
- L.L. Ivanov. Antarctica: Livingston Island and Smith Island. Scale 1:100000 topographic map. Manfred Wörner Foundation, 2017. ISBN 978-619-90008-3-0
