= Michael Mirov =

Bishop in the Bulgarian Greek Catholic Church (1859 – 1923)

- Titular Archbishop of Theodosiopolis ante Apri
- Native name: Михаил Миров
- Church: Bulgarian Greek Catholic Church
- In office: 8 January 1907 – 17 August 1923
- Predecessor: Pietro Maglione
- Successor: Nicola Marconi

Orders
- Ordination: 6 January 1883
- Consecration: 19 February 1907 by Michael Petkov

Personal details
- Born: 1859 Topuzlare, Eyalet of Adrianople, Ottoman Empire
- Died: 17 August 1923 (aged 63–64) Istanbul, Occupied Istanbul, State of Turkey

Archbishop Michael Mirov (1859 in Topuzlare, Ottoman Empire – 17 August 1923 in Istanbul, Ottoman Empire) was a bishop in the Bulgarian Greek Catholic Church.

He was born into the Bulgarian Orthodox Church in the today Bulgarian village of Zornitsa, Burgas Province, then Topuzlare in the Ottoman Empire. More after Michael Mirov converted to Catholicism and graduated from Assumptionist high school in Edirne. Mirov studied theology and philosophy at the Major Seminary in Constantinople. On 6 January 1883 he was ordained a priest by Bishop Michael Petkov and was appointed to his native village. He opened a school for children and evening classes for adults. In 1888 began the construction of the new church, which was consecrated on 8 September 1891. In 1900 the Church of the Blessed Virgin added a 24-meter tower. Later, Father Mirov built the Church of the Holy Family in the Dovrukli village. In 1907 was elevated to the rank of archbishop.

On 25 March 1911, future Exarch of the Russian Greek Catholic Church Leonid Feodorov received ordination as a Byzantine Rite priest by the hands of Metropolitan Michael Mirov in Constantinople.

He died on 17 August 1923.
