= Briula =

Ancient city and bishopric of ancient Lydia

Coordinates: 37°57′40″N 28°38′58″E

Briula or Brioula (Ancient Greek: Βρίουλα) was an ancient city and bishopric of ancient Lydia or of Caria in Asia Minor, which remains a Latin Catholic titular see.

Its site is located near Billara in Asiatic Turkey.

== History ==
The city was important enough in the Late Roman province of Asia Prima to be one of the suffragans of its great capital Ephesus's Metropolitan Archbishopric. However, like most, it was to fade.

=== Titular see ===
The diocese was nominally restored in as Latin Catholic titular bishopric.

It has had the following incumbents, all of the fitting episcopal (lowest) rank :

- Kyril Stefan Kurteff (1926.07.31 – 1971.03.09), twice Apostolic Exarch of Sofia of the Bulgarians (Bulgaria) (1926.07.31 – 1942 and 1951.04.27 – death 1971.03.09)
- Christo Proykov (1993.12.18 – ...), Apostolic Exarch of above Sofia of the Bulgarians (Bulgaria) (1995.09.05 – ...), President of Episcopal Conference of Bulgaria

== See also ==
- Catholic Church in Turkey
