= Zornitsa, Burgas Province =

Zornitsa
- Village
- Location in Bulgaria
- Coordinates: 42.385°N 26.929°E
- Country: Bulgaria
- Province: Burgas Province
- Municipality: Sredets Municipality
- Time zone: UTC+2 (EET)
  - Summer (DST): UTC+3 (EEST)

Zornitsa is a village in Sredets Municipality, in Burgas Province, in southeastern Bulgaria.

Zornitsa Cove in Livingston Island in the South Shetland Islands, Antarctica is named after Zornitsa.
