= Nil Izvorov =

Bulgarian hierarch, activist and participant in the struggle for an independent Church

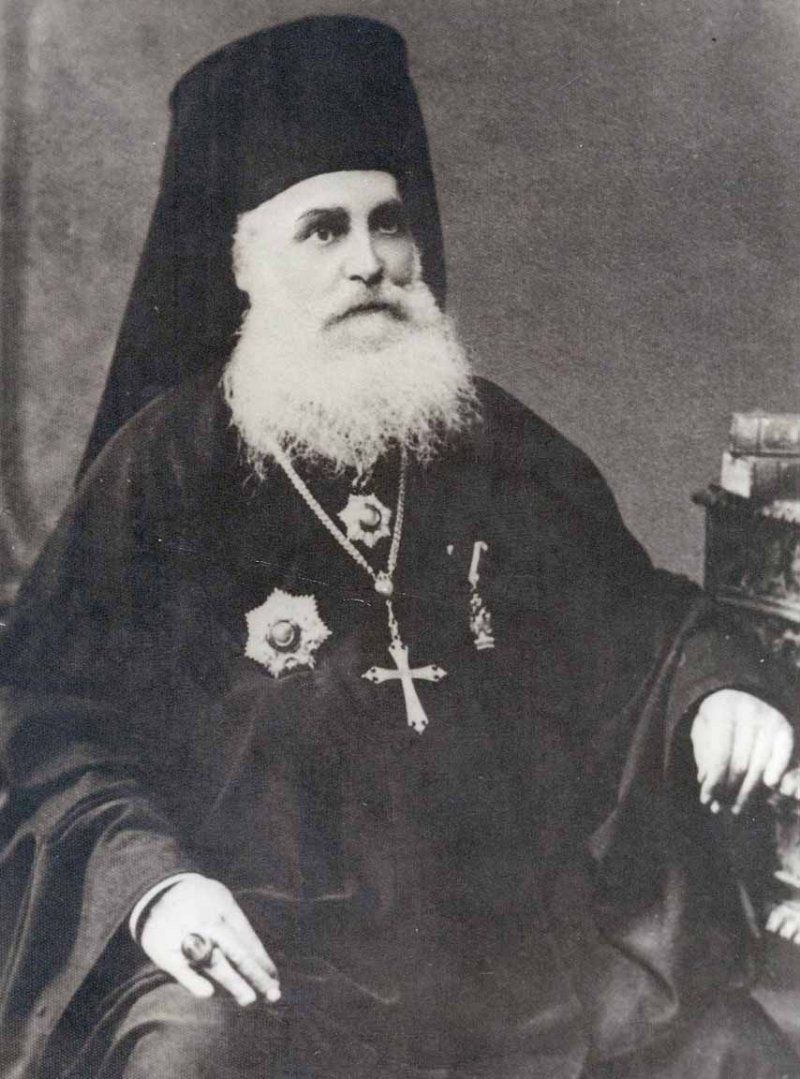
- Born: Nikola Izvorov; August 23, 1823; Ruse, Ottoman Empire
- Died: March 13, 1905 (aged 81); Sofia, Bulgaria
- Occupation: Apostolic Vicar

Nil Izvorov (Bulgarian: Нил Изворов, August 23, 1823 – March 13, 1905) was a Bulgarian hierarch, activist of the Bulgarian National Revival and participant in the struggle for an independent Bulgarian Church. In 1874, as a bishop of the Orthodox Church he became Bulgarian Uniate and Apostolic Administrator of the Bulgarian Uniates in the Ottoman Empire. At the end of his life returned to the Orthodoxy.

== Biography ==
Nil Izvorov was born in Ruse on August 23, 1823 under the name Nikola Dimitrov. In November 1842 he enrolled as a monk in the Cocosh Monastery in Niculițel where he remained until 1862. From 1863 he was a chairman of the parish council in Ruse. In 1872 he was invited by the Bulgarian Orthodox Exarch in Constantinople, and was ordained in the Episcopal rank in July 1873 with the title Smolenski. Early next year he was sent to Thessalonica to help the building of the structures of Bulgarian Exarchate.

Nil went to Macedonia without the necessary documents, causing protests of the Porte. The Exarchate, which was under pressure agreed to recall Nil, but he refused to obey. This situation was key to his conversion to Uniatism. His refusal was associated with the uncertain status of some Bulgarian municipalities in Macedonia in the process of their separation from the Greek Orthodox Patriarchate of Constantinople and their switch to the newly formed Bulgarian Exarchate. At this time there was widespread rumor that the Bulgarian Church was preparing an agreement with the Greek Patriarchate, whereby the Exarchate should abandon its positions in Macedonia. The rumor was based on the real position of the Russian ambassador in Constantinople Count Nicholas Ignatiev, who was restrained on the issue of extension of the Bulgarian Exarchate's influence in Macedonia.

Consent of the Exarchate to recall Nil was taken as a sign of Bulgarian-Greek agreement. This action causes a negative reaction in six Bulgarian municipalities in Macedonia. They began negotiations with to keep their spiritual head Nil. As a result, three of them (Thessalonika, Voden and Kukush) required from the Exarchate a new independent diocese to be set up and Nil to become its bishop. After the Exarchate's refusal, the municipalities decided to act. They first approached the British Consul to be adopted in the Anglican Church led by its bishop Nil. After the refusal of the British, they turned to Bulgarian Uniate Bishop Raphael Popov, which responded positively.

In the late winter of 1874 Bishop Nil travel from Thessaloniki to Istanbul, where he officially adopted Uniatism. He did not get a permission to return to his diocese, and lived in the capital of the Ottoman Empire. After the death of Bishop Rafael Popov in September, 1876 the Holy See Nil was appointed as a spiritual head of the Uniate Bulgarians. In the same year on September 21, he was officially introduced to the rank of bishop. In November, the Ottoman government issued the necessary pick, and the Nile returned to his episcopal seat in Edirne. After a short stay he left for Kilkis in March 1877. During the Russo-Turkish war (1877-1878), the Nil went back to Constantinople. In 1882 he was appointed as Apostolic Administrator of the Uniate Bulgarians in Istanbul. In the spring of 1895, after long hesitation, Archbishop Nil appealed to the Bulgarian Holy Synod to be re-admitted to the Orthodox Church. After his retirement in 1895, Izvorov settled in Sofia where he died on March 13, 1905.
