= Kuklen =

Kuklen Куклен
- Town
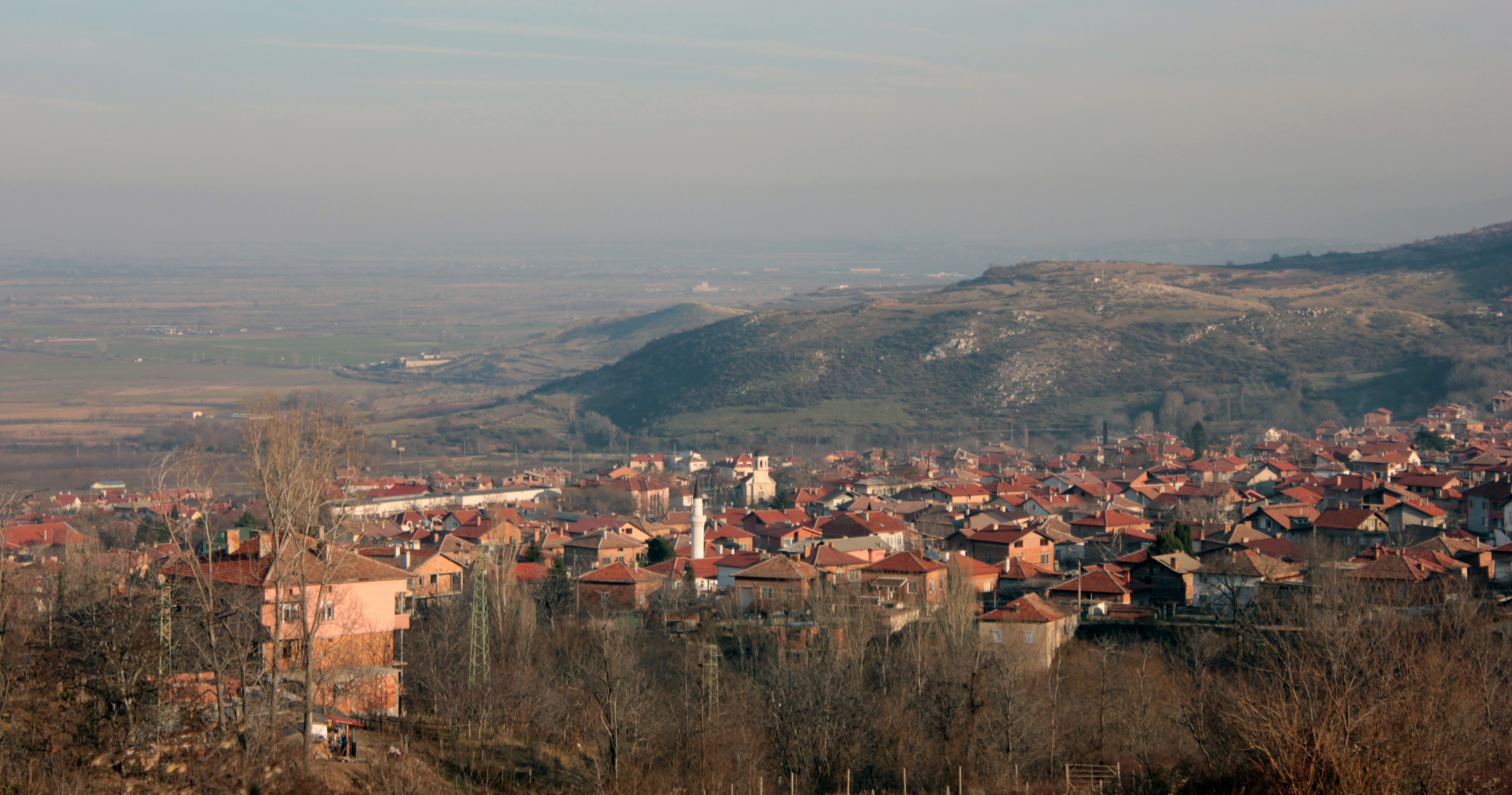
- View of Kuklen from the road to the Kuklen Monastery

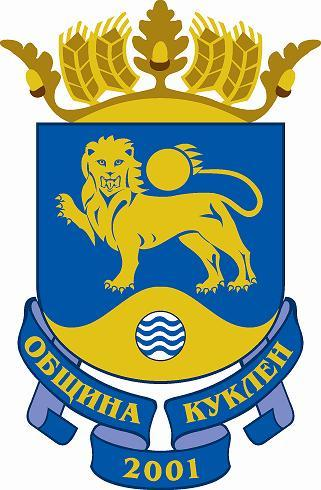
- Coat of arms

- Kulken in Bulgaria
- Coordinates: 42.033°N 24.783°E
- Country: Bulgaria
- Province: Plovdiv
- Municipality: Kuklen

Government
  - Mayor: Maria Belcheva (GP)

Area
  - Total: 31.524 km^{2} (12.171 sq mi)
- Elevation: 393 m (1,289 ft)

Population (2015)
  - Total: 6,046
- Postal code: 4101
- Area code: 03115
- Vehicle registration: РВ

Kuklen (Bulgarian: Куклен [ˈkuklɛn]) is a town in southern Bulgaria, part of Plovdiv Province. It is located 7 km to the south of the nearest major city, Plovdiv, and is approximately 140 km south east of the Bulgarian capital, Sofia. Kuklen was proclaimed a town on 23 May 2006, and as of 2005 had a population of 6,877. It is the center of Kuklen Municipality.

Kuklen is notable for having, despite its low population, not only a majority Bulgarian Orthodox population with several Orthodox churches, but also Muslim residents and a mosque, as well as a Greek Catholic community and a Catholic place of worship, with all three religious communities living on good terms with each other.

== Geography ==
Kuklen is located in the plains of the Rhodopes, 7 km. east of Plovdiv.

== Population ==
The number of permanent residents in Kuklen is 6,881, and 6,000 more are temporary.

As of February 2011, Kuklen has 5,858 residents.

== Born in Kuklen ==
- Recep Küpçü, Bulgarian poet of Turkish origin

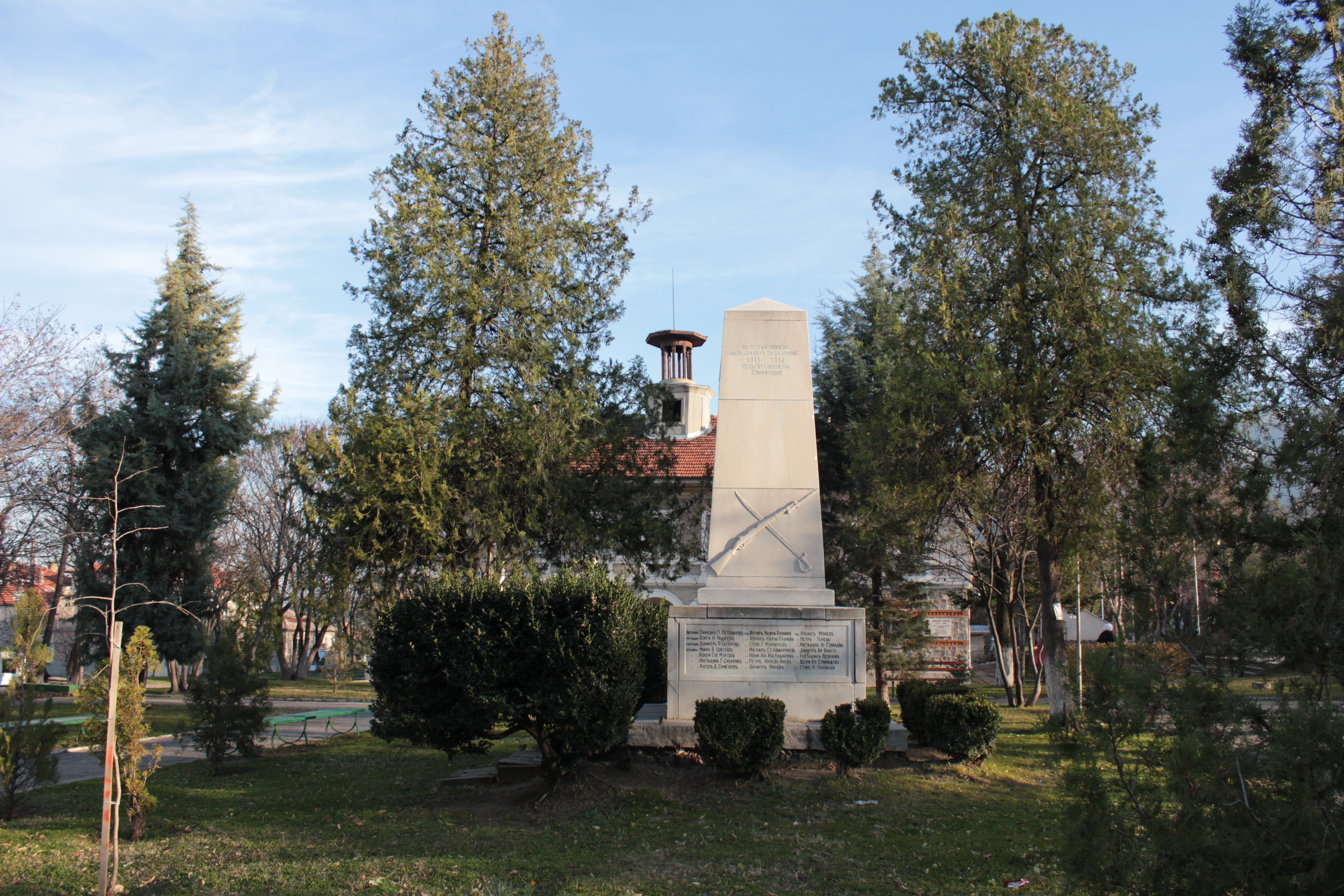
The war memorial in Kuklen.

== Honor ==
Kuklen Point on Livingston Island, South Shetland Islands is named after Kuklen.
