= Michał Bałasz =

Polish architect (1923–2025)

Bałasz in his later years

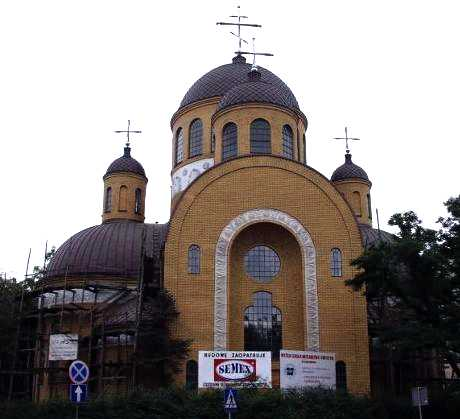
The Orthodox Church of the Icon of Our Lady of Częstochowa is a Polish Orthodox church in Częstochowa honoring the Icon of Our Lady of Częstochowa and designed by Michał Bałasz.

Michał Bałasz (22 January 1923 – 18 July 2025) was a Polish architect, specializing in sacred architecture, notably Orthodox and Roman Catholic churches. Bałasz was born in Wilno, Poland (now Vilnius, Lithuania) on 22 January 1923.

Bałasz died on 18 July 2025, at the age of 102.

== Notable works ==
- The Orthodox Church of the Icon of Our Lady of Częstochowa in Częstochowa
- The Orthodox Church of St. Demetrius in Hajnówka
- The Roman Catholic Church of the Resurrection in Białystok
- The Orthodox Church of the Hagia Sophia in Białystok
- The Roman Catholic Church of Divine Providence in Bielsk Podlaski
- The Orthodox Church of St. Anne in Boratyniec Ruski
