= Redjeb Kyupchu =

Turkish-Bulgarian writer and poet (1934–1976)

Реджеп Кюпчу
- Redjeb Kyupchu
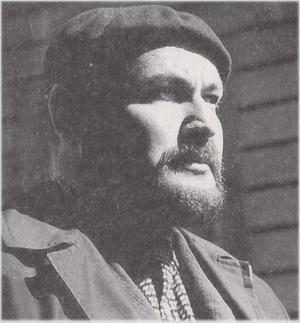
- Recep Küpçü in 1974
- Born: 28 September 1934; Kuklen
- Died: 26 April 1976 (age 42); Varna
- Burial place: Burgas
- Citizenship: Bulgarian
- Spouse: Cemile Küpçü
- Children: Erdinç Küpçü
- Awards: Poetry of Burgas

Redzheb Kyupchu (Bulgarian: Реджеб Кюпчю, romanized: Recep Küpçü; 28 September 1934 – 26 April 1976) was a Bulgarian poet and writer of Turkish ethnicity who wrote in both Bulgarian and Turkish. Born in 1934 in the town of Kuklen, he spent most of his life in Burgas, where he met various and influential Bulgarian writers. He met Turkish communist authors such as Aziz Nesin as well.

While he was alive, he published three collections of poems. In some of his poems, he strongly expresses his Turkish identity and thus managed to attract the attention of the Bulgarian Communist Party. He remained unemployed, but nevertheless he did not stop writing. He died in 1976 under suspicious circumstances. To this day, the cause of his death is unclear.

== Early life ==
Redjeb Kyupchu was born on 28 September 1934, in the village of Kuklen (Turkish: Kukla), Plovdiv region, which had a multicultural population of Bulgarian Orthodox, Muslim, and Greek Orthodox residents. His parents were farmers. From an early age he felt love and interest in literature. He completed his primary and secondary education Kuklen and then moved firstly to the Kardzhali Turkish Pedagogical School and later at the Razgrad Pedagogical School. During his military service, he worked in the editorial office of the newspaper Trudovo delo as a journalist-correspondent. After completing his military service, Kyupchu settled in his wife's hometown, Burgas.

== Burgas ==
Just a few years after the exodus, in 1956, he moved with his wife, Cemile, to the Black Sea city of Burgas, where their three children were born – two boys and a girl. His first son, Ünal died at the age of 14 from cancer, and later his daughter, also at young age. Only Erdinç survived. In Burgas, he met famous Bulgarian writers such as Hristo Fotev, Iliya Burzhev, Stoycho Gotsev, Dimitar Velinov and Nedyalko Yordanov, with whom he established friendship. He built a particularly deep relationship with Nedyalko Yordanov. There he became a member of the Society of Writers in Burgas, and received the Burgas poetry award.

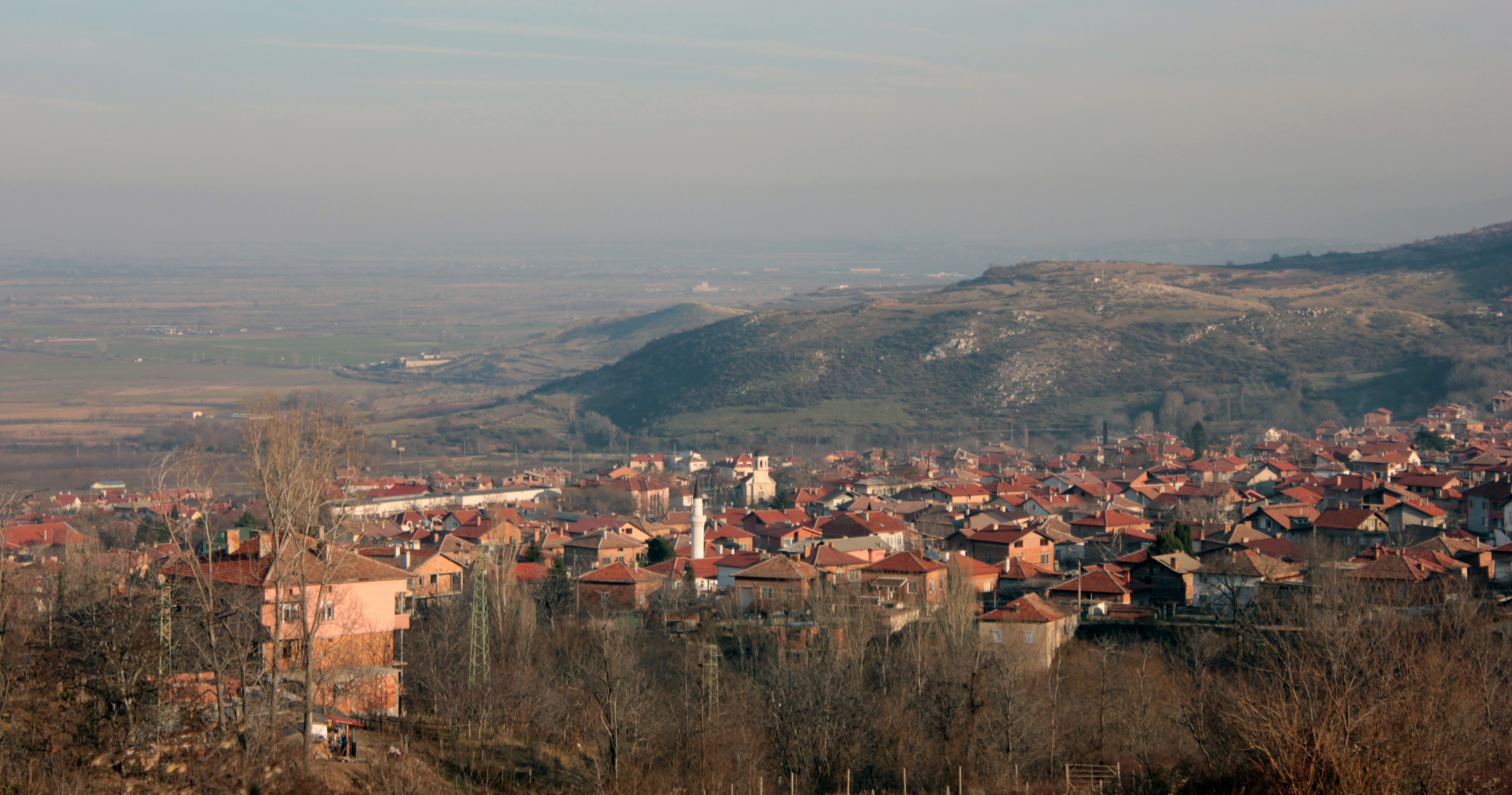
View of Kuklen, the birthplace of Kyupchu

He published two poetry books The questions continue (1962) and Life is not a dream (1965). It is known that he wanted to dedicate a book to his hometown Kuklen as well but was unable to because of his untimely death. With great efforts on the part of Nedyalko Yordanov, another collection of poems called Friends of mine, let's go was printed in 1967 in Varna, but this time translated into Bulgarian. This made Kyupchu one of the first Bulgarian Turkish authors translated into Bulgarian.

In 1965, he had the chance to meet Turkish communist writers such as Yaşar Kemal, Aziz Nesin and Fakir Baykurt. According to Yordanov, they were all amazed by Kyupchu's good Turkish, even though he had never studied the language.

Although he and his wife, Cemile, were happy with the changes in their lives, rumors soon emerged that Recep was against the party and communist ideals. These rumors intensified after the publication of his second book. With the rise of his popularity, the strong presence of Turkish identity in his poetry, and rumours, Kyupchu managed to attract the attention of the State Security officials. He was ordered to use the Bulgarian-Slavic suffixes "ov", "ev" after his name in 1968. Because of his refusal to do so, he began to attract the attention of State Security officials. He refused to send articles to the newspaper Nova Svetlina, as they will be published with Bulgarian suffixes. At that time, his Bulgarian colleagues reached out to him and tried to help him in every way, but to no avail; he did not manage to stay in different jobs for a long time.

== Death ==
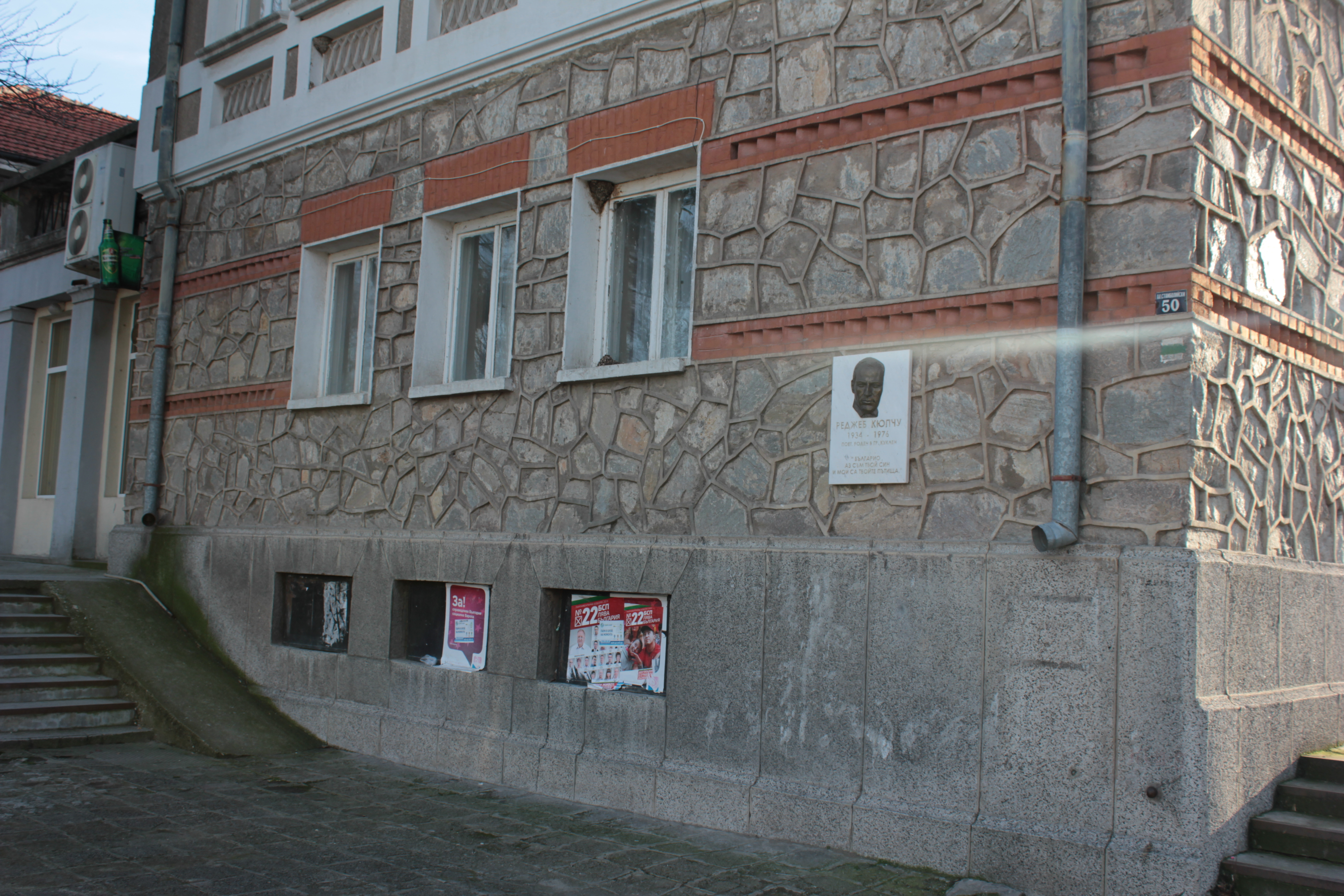
A memorial plate of Redjeb Kyupchu in Kuklen

On 26 April 1976, he was called to Varna as an emergency. Shortly before leaving, he left a note for his wife saying that he will be back soon, but that did not happen. On the same day, Kyupchu died, the cause of his death remaining unknown, as an autopsy was forbidden on his body. The authorities issued different versions of his death; at first it was said that he died of a stroke, and later that he was murdered by Turkish nationalists.

After his death, the harassment of his family continued. His 16-year-old son Erdinç was often called to the militia and beaten continuously, and at the age of 20 he was imprisoned in Stara Zagora. During one visit to his mother in prison, Kyupchu's house was raided, and his manuscripts stolen. Vasil Angelov, head of the State Security department for artists, advised his poet friends not to deal with the already deceased Kyupchu.

To this day, the cause of his death remains unclear.

== Poetry ==
Although he had never been to Turkey, Anatolia was influential in his poetry. South in his poetry symbolizes Turkey. In various poems, he uses metaphors such as "birds that smell like Anatolia" to express his love. His relatives and acquaintances say that he used to ask the Turkish sailors he met "to salute even the shadows of the Anatolian minarets." Istanbul likewise had a strong presence. Once, when he saw an Istanbulite, he told him that he is well acquainted with the city, since "since he was a child, he has been going there every night in his dreams." However, he does not feel hatred towards Bulgaria, and even creates poems dedicated to his homeland and perceives his country as a mother and himself as one of many sons. The duality is strongly expressed when he talks about his ethnicity, especially in his poem Kader (Destiny):

Since he was born in Kuklen, located in the Rhodopes, the mountains are also present in his poetry. The sea is also an important symbol, as he spent a large part of his life in Burgas. Sea, sun, spring, birds, flowers, south are another common symbol in his poetry.

In addition to being an active writer, he also works as a journalist for the newspapers "Trduovo delo" and "Nova svelitsa."

== Legacy ==
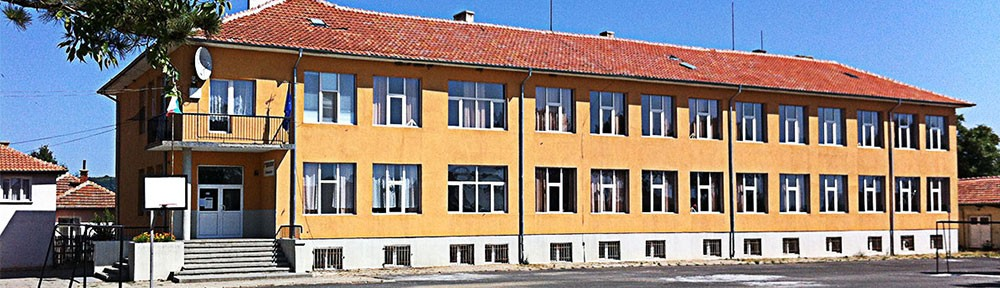
Redjeb Kyupchu school in Topchiysko, Burgas

In the village of Topchiysko, Burgas, there is a school named after him. A Turkish cultural center in Burgas also bears his name. There are numerous literary criticisms and analyzes of his works, both in Bulgarian and Turkish. Rıza Mollaoğlu describes him and his poetry as a light for all Turks living in Bulgaria. Some of his poems are studied at Turkish schools in Turkey. Every year his death is commemorated in different cities like Edirne, İzmir, İstanbul, and Burgas.

== See also ==
- Hrant Dink
- Revival Process
- Big Excursion
