= Babinets (architecture) =

Church architecture element

Babinets (Czech: Babinec, Polish: Babiniec, Russian: Бабинец, Ukrainian: Бабинець) is a compartment in some Slavic churches, historically intended for women. The term derives from the Slavic word baba, "woman".

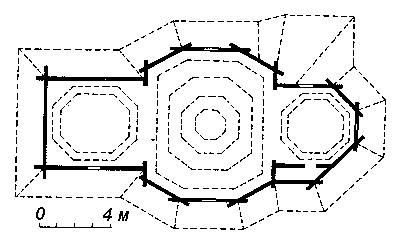

Tarnów Cathedral: 3- Babiniec, 4-Southern narthex

== See also ==
- Eastern Orthodox church architecture
- Church porch
