= Kuklen Municipality =

Coordinates: 42°1′N 24°46′E

Kuklen Municipality Община Куклен
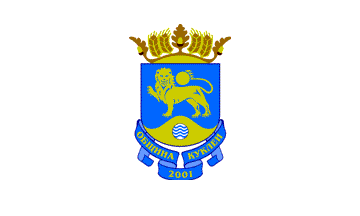
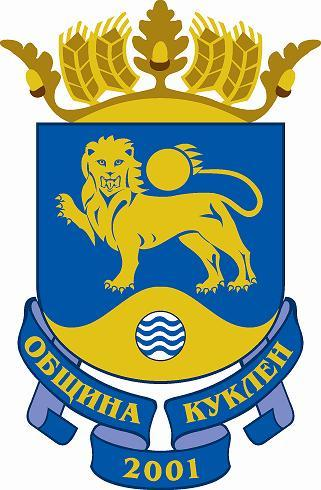
- Flag Coat of arms

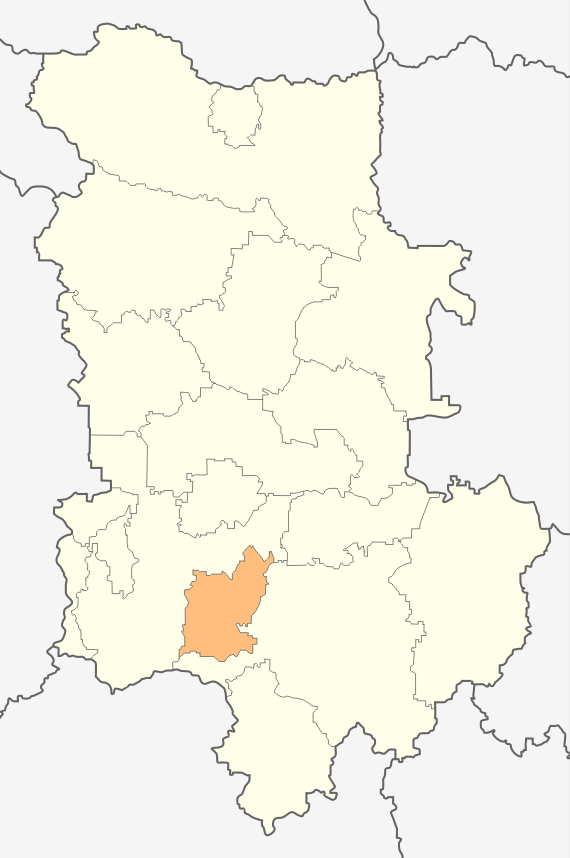
- Country: Bulgaria
- Province: Plovdiv Province
- Seat: Kuklen

Area
  - Total: 148.4 km^{2} (57.3 sq mi)

Population (2024)
  - Total: 6,134
  - Density: 41.33/km^{2} (107.1/sq mi)
- Website: kuklen.org

Kuklen Municipality (Bulgarian: Община Куклен) is a municipality in Plovdiv Province, central Bulgaria. Covering a territory of 148.4 km^{2}, it is the 13th largest of the 18 municipalities in the province, encompassing 2.48% of its total area. It borders the municipalities of Rodopi to the west and north, and Asenovgrad to the east and south. Established in 2001 from the southwestern portion of Rodopi Municipality, it is among the most recent administrative units in the country.

== Geography ==
The topography is varied from flat in the north and mountainous in most of the municipal territory. The northern 10% lie within the southern reaches of the Upper Thracian Plain, where lowest point at 167 m. The rest of Kuklen Municipality is formed by the northern slopes of the Rhodope Mountains and in particular the northeastern part of the Chernatitsa ridge. There rises its highest point, the summit of Byala Cherkva (1,646 m).

Most of the municipality is drained by the river Lukovitsa, a left tributary of the Chepelarska reka, itself a right tributary of the Maritsa of the Aegean Sea basin. It flows in a deep and mostly inaccessible valley. The northern portions are drained by small rivers and streams which enter the extensive irrigation systems of the Upper Thracian Plain as they leave the mountains.

== Economy ==
The municipality is home to the Kuklen Industrial Zone, one of the six in the region around Plovdiv that form the Trakia Economic Zone, one of the biggest economic projects in Bulgaria. The zone spans over 1,000,000 m^{2} and hosts several companies, the most important being KCM — one of the largest non-ferrous metallurgical plants in the region and the leading national producer of lead and zinc.

== Transport ==
Kuklen Municipality is traversed by three roads of the national network with a total length of 31.7 km: a 4.1 km section of the second class II-86 road Plovdiv–Smolyan–Rudozem, a 25.2 km stretch of the third class III-8604 road, and the last 2.4 km of the third class III-8006 road.

== Demography ==
The population is 6,134 as of 2024.

There are five villages and one town in Kuklen Municipality:

- Dobralak
- Galabovo
- Kuklen
- Ruen
- Tsar Kaloyan
- Yavrovo

== Gallery ==
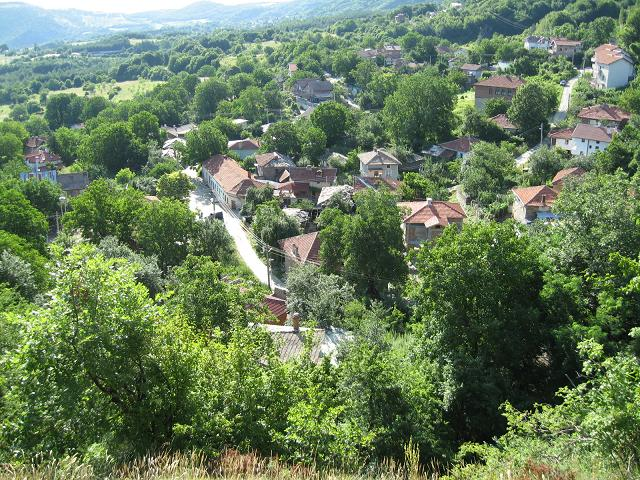
A view of Tsar Kaloyan

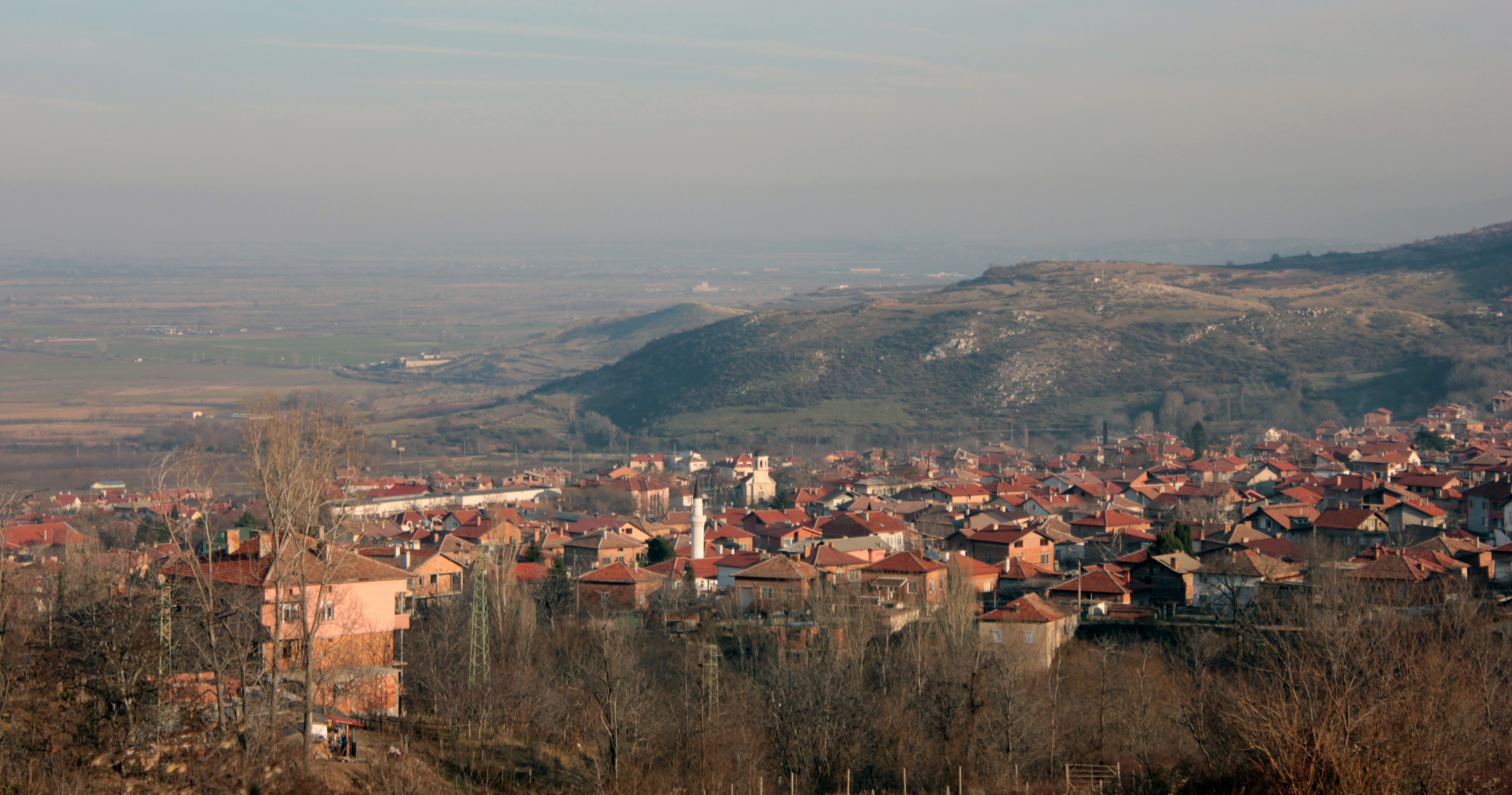
A view of Kuklen

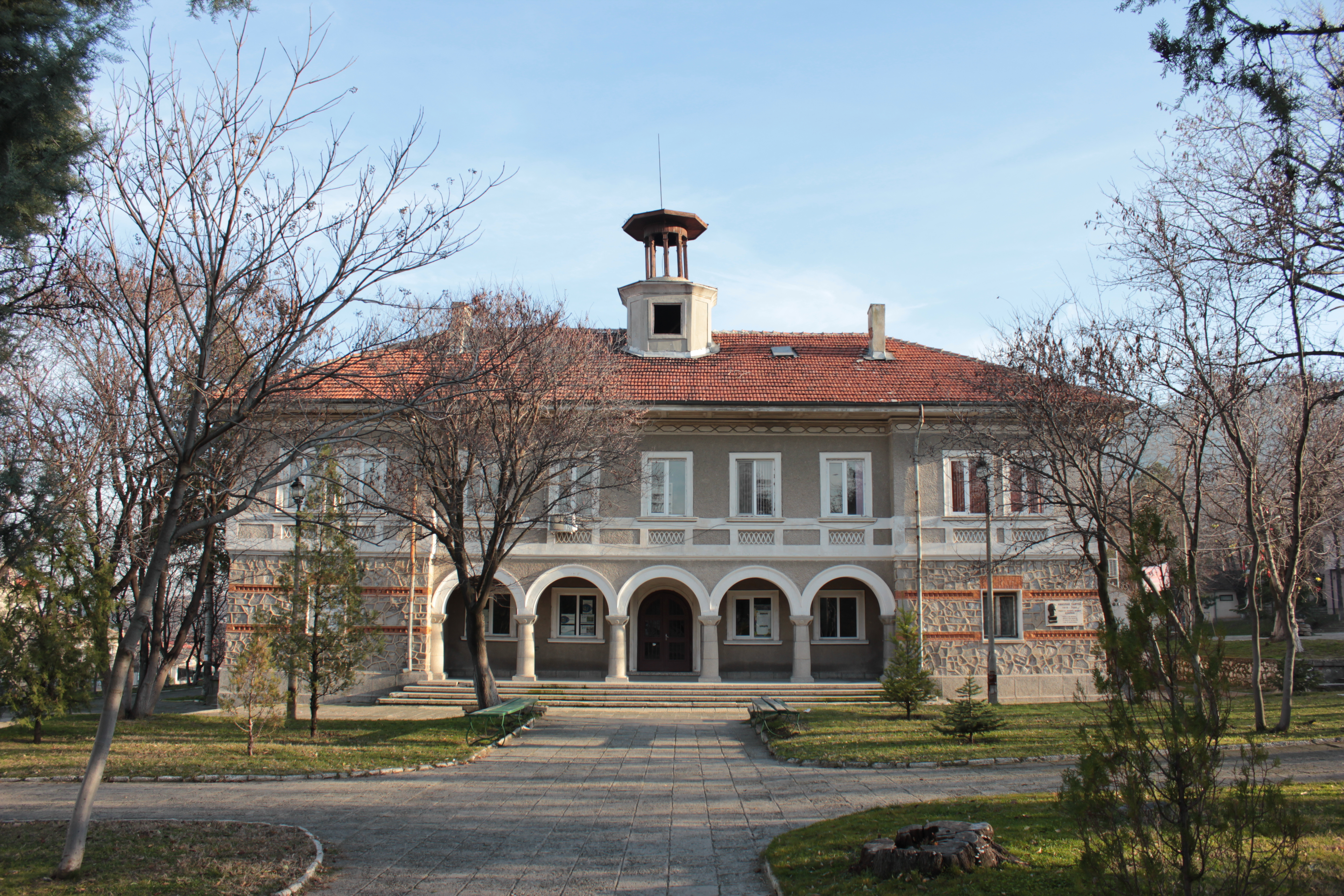
The chitalishte of Kuklen
