= Nedyalko Yordanov =

Bulgarian poet and playwright (born 1940)

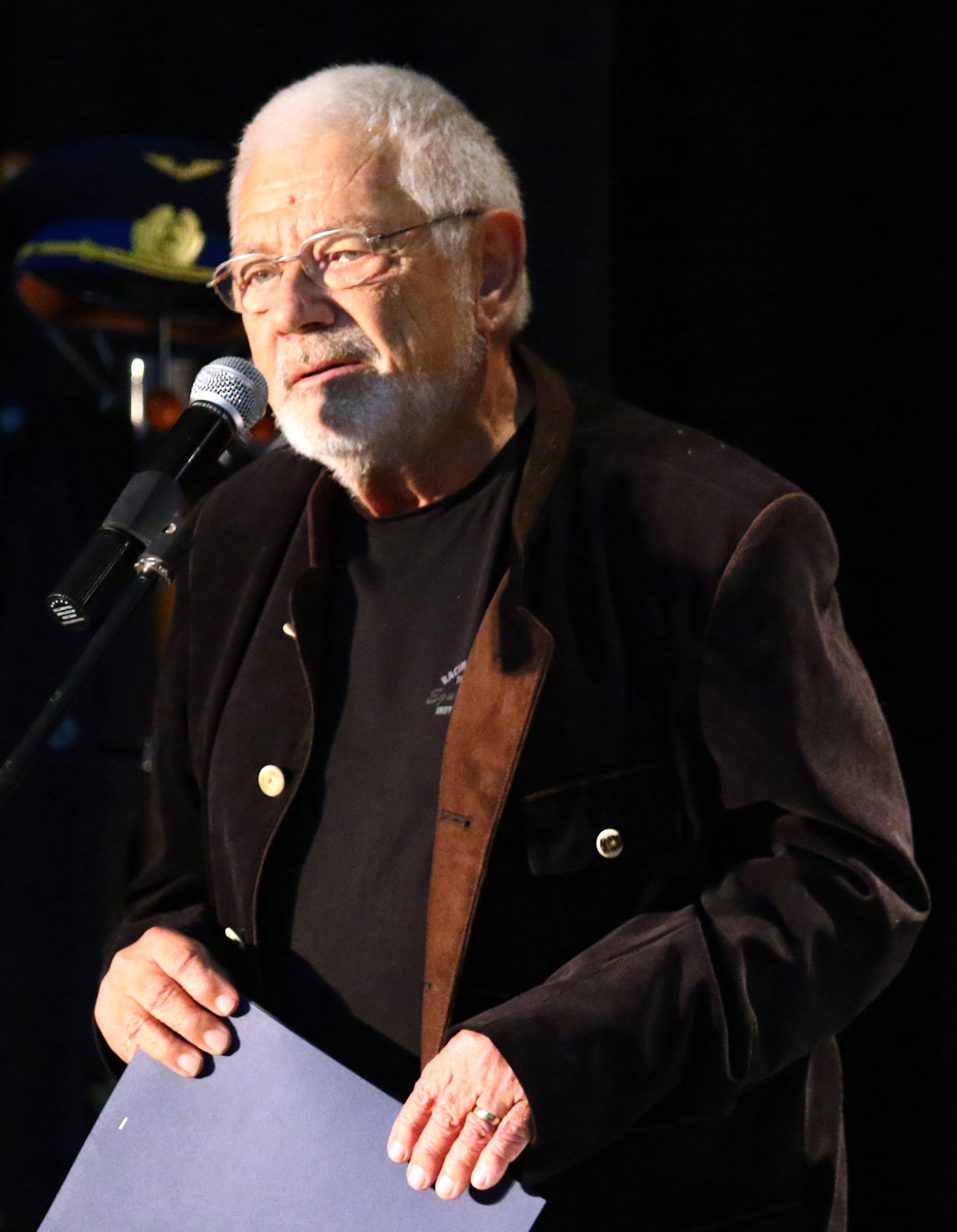

Nedyalko Yordanov (Bulgarian: Недялко Йорданов, born 18 January 1940) is a Bulgarian poet, playwright, and publicist. He graduated from high school in his hometown Burgas on the Black Sea coast. In 1962 he graduated with a degree in Bulgarian philology from the St. Clement of Ohrid Sofia University. Between 1962 and 1963 he worked as a teacher in Malko Tarnovo.

Later, from 1963 to 1983 he was a playwright in the Burgas drama theatre. For the period 1980–1988 he was the main editor of the almanac Sea. During 1990 he became a playwright for the theatre Vazrazhdane in Sofia.

He began publishing in 1954 in the newspaper Black Sea Front, Burgas. He is actively cooperating with the daily press. He was a close friend of Recep Küpçü. He translates poetry from Russian and Turkish. His works are translated into Russian, Polish, German and many other languages.
