= Eastern Orthodox church architecture =

Type of church building

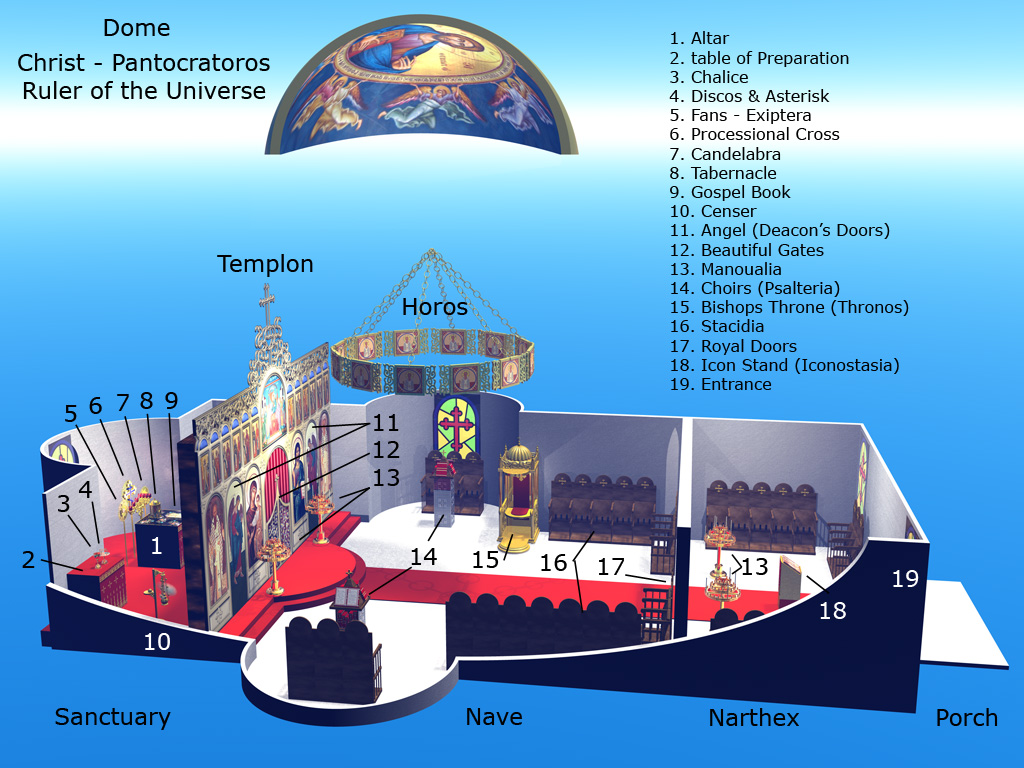
An illustrated layout of the traditional interior of an Eastern Orthodox church

Eastern Orthodox church architecture constitutes a distinct, recognizable family of styles among church architectures. These styles share a cluster of fundamental similarities, having been influenced by the common legacy of Byzantine architecture from the Eastern Roman Empire. Some of the styles have become associated with the particular traditions of one specific autocephalous Eastern Orthodox patriarchate, whereas others are more widely used within the Eastern Orthodox Church.

These architectural styles have held substantial influence over cultures outside Eastern Orthodoxy; particularly in the architecture of Islamic mosques, but also to some degree in Western churches.

== History ==
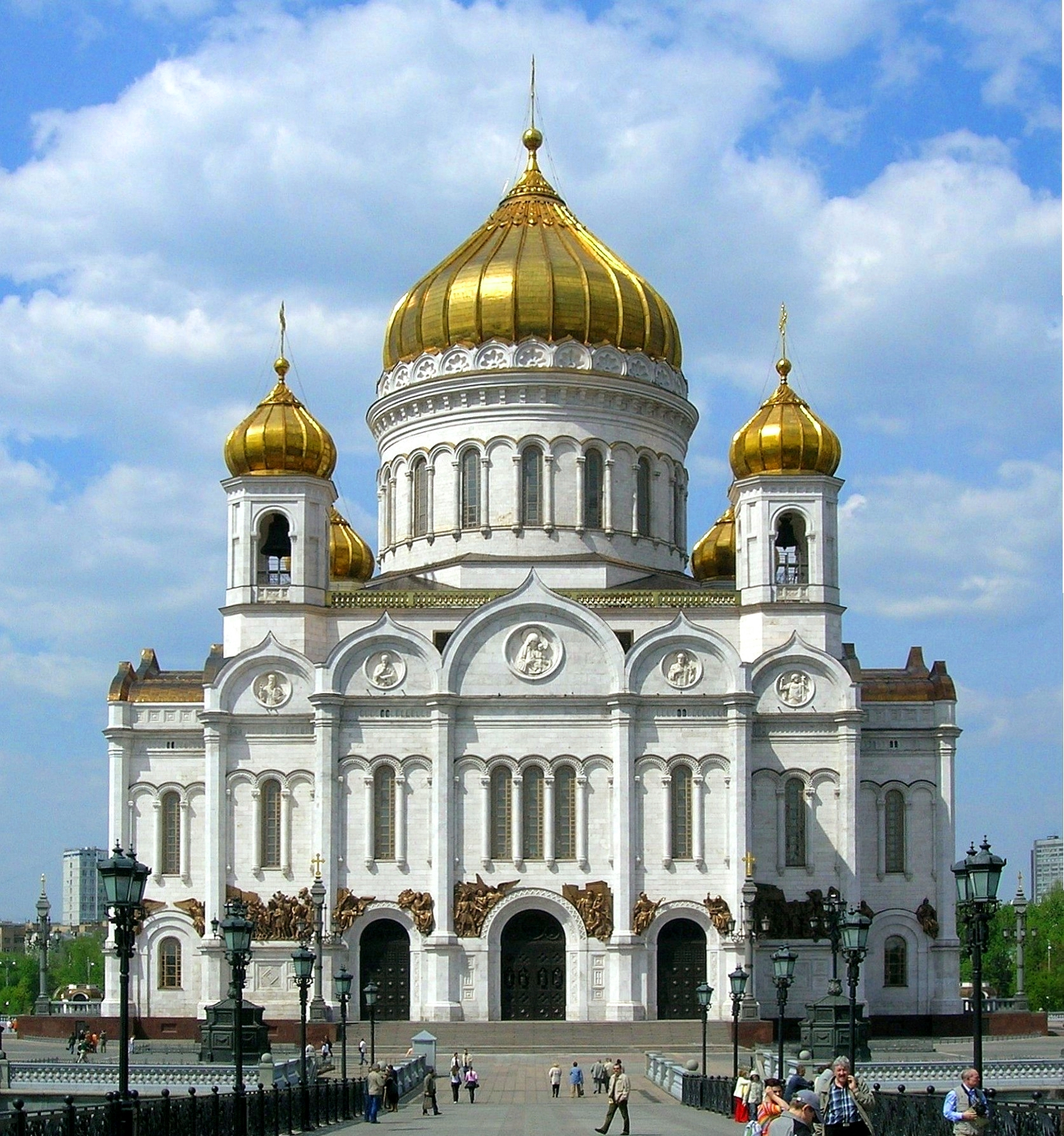
The Cathedral of Christ the Saviour in Moscow, the world's second-tallest Orthodox church

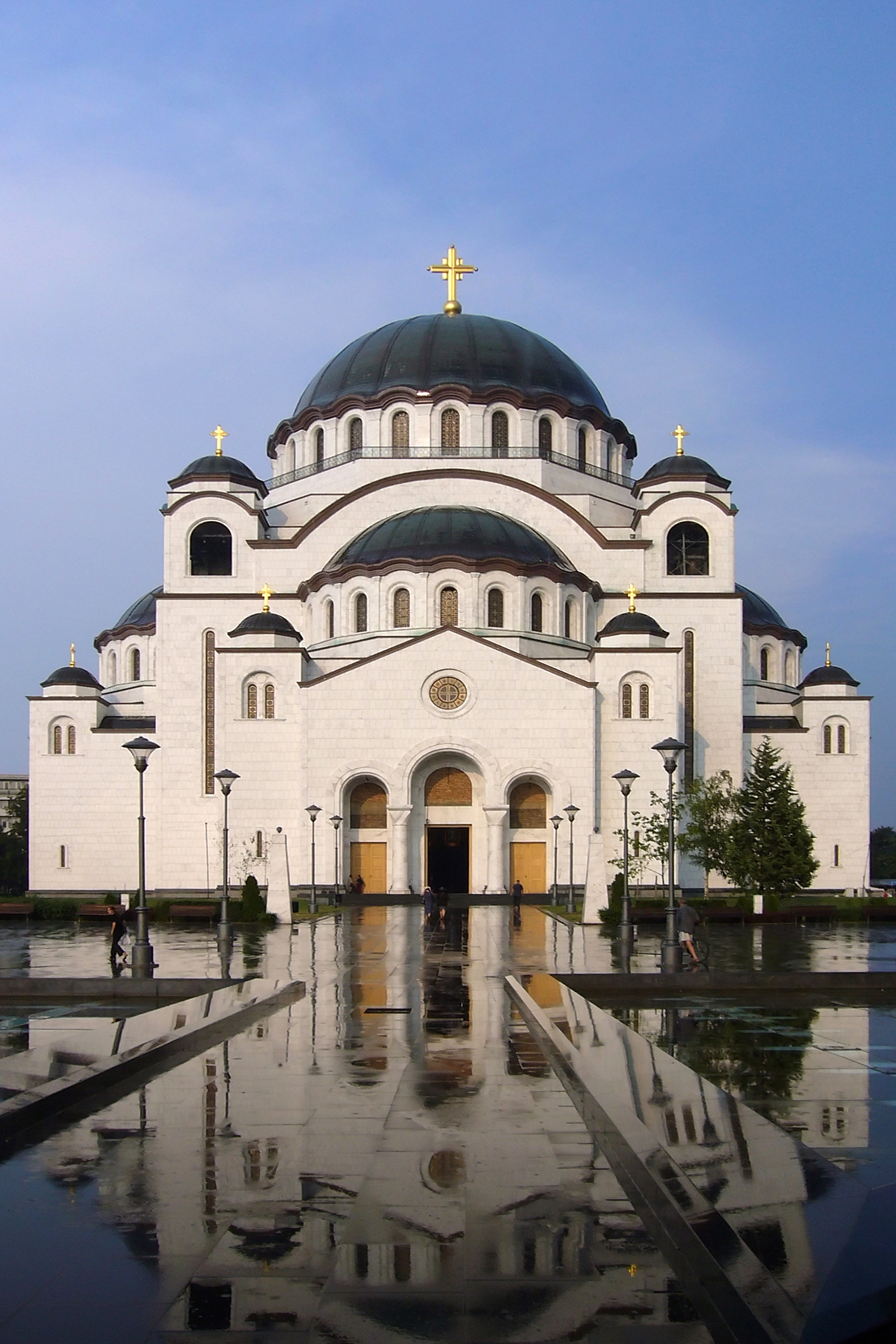
The Cathedral of Saint Sava in Belgrade, Serbia

While sharing many traditions, Eastern Christianity and Western Christianity began to diverge from each other from an early date. Whereas the basilica, a long aisled hall with an apse at one end, was the most common form in the West, a more compact centralised style became predominant in the East.

These churches were in origin "martyria" focused on the tombs of the saints—specifically, the martyrs who had died during the persecutions of Christians, which only fully ended with the conversion of the Emperor Constantine (AD 337). They are usually roofed over by a dome which symbolised heaven. The central dome was then often surrounded by structures at the four points of the compass producing a cruciform shape—these were themselves often topped by towers or domes. The centralised and basilica structures were sometimes combined as in the church of Hagia Sophia in Constantinople (construction began in AD 360). The basilican east end then allowed for the erection of an iconostasis, a screen on which icons are hung and which conceals the altar from the worshippers except at those points in the liturgy when its doors are opened.

A variant form of the centralised church was developed in Russia and came to prominence in the 16th century. Here the dome was replaced by a much thinner and taller hipped or conical roof which, it is said, originated from the need to prevent snow from remaining on roofs. One of the finest examples of these tented churches is St. Basil's in Red Square in Moscow.

For a long time, the art of architecture was primarily concerned with the design of churches and aristocratic palaces, therefore the evolution of Orthodox churches represents a major part of the history of Byzantine architecture and Russian architecture. More detailed information is presented in those articles.

Unlike Western Christian architecture with its tendencies toward modernity (see, e.g., Liverpool Metropolitan Cathedral or Notre Dame du Haut), Orthodox architectural style remains largely conservative and traditional. One notable and architecturally important exception is Frank Lloyd Wright's design of Annunciation Greek Orthodox Church in Wauwatosa, Wisconsin, in the United States.

The Archdiocesan Cathedral of the Holy Trinity on New York City's Upper East Side is the largest Orthodox Christian church in the Western Hemisphere.

== Terminology ==
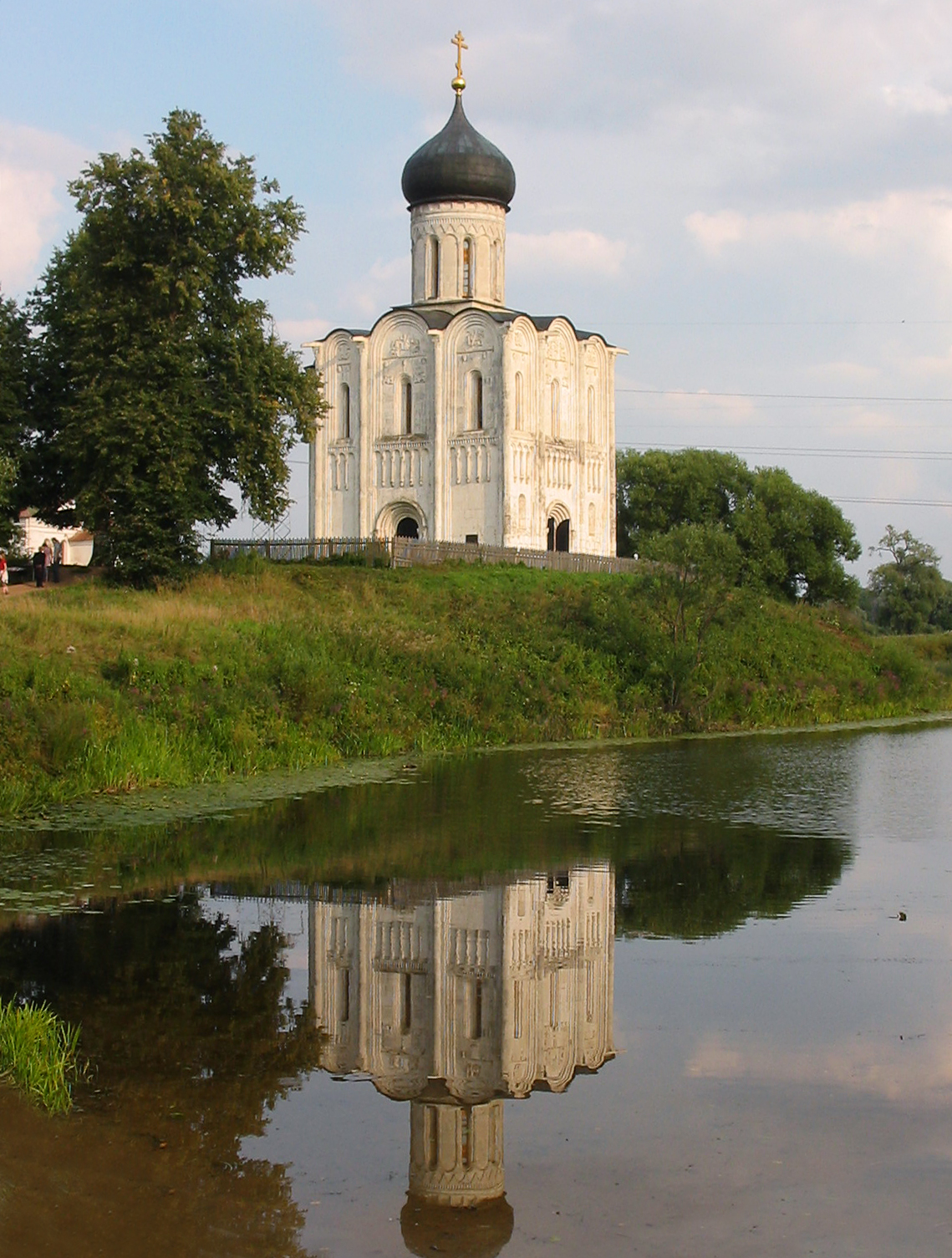
Church of the Intercession on the Nerl (1165), one of the most famous Russian medieval churches. Part of the White Monuments of Vladimir and Suzdal site, on the UNESCO World Heritage List.

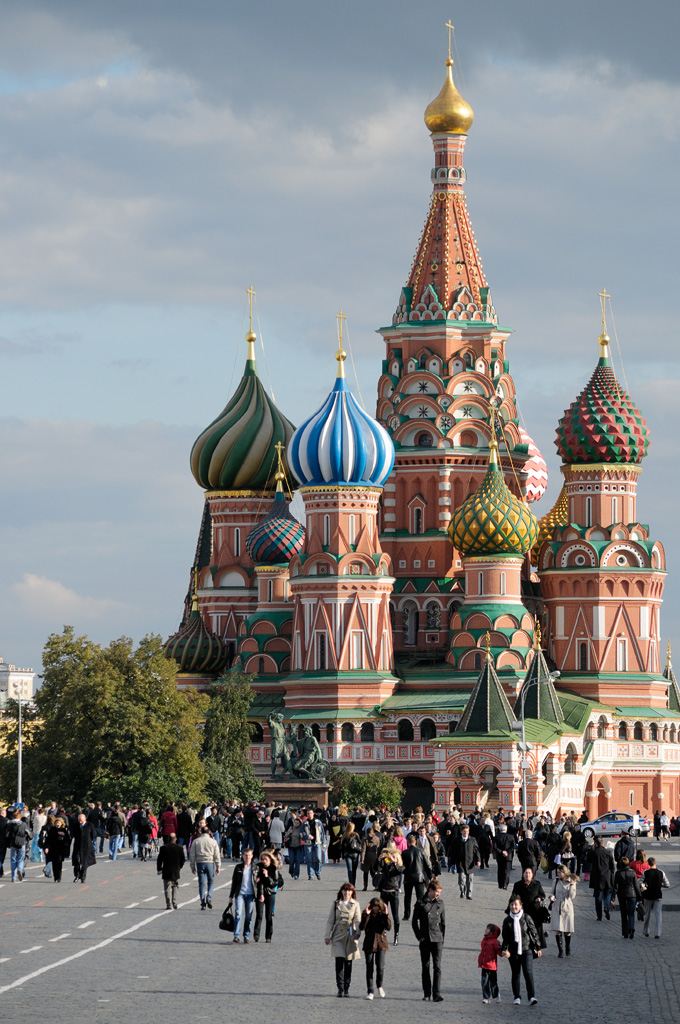
Saint Basil's Cathedral in Moscow's Red Square

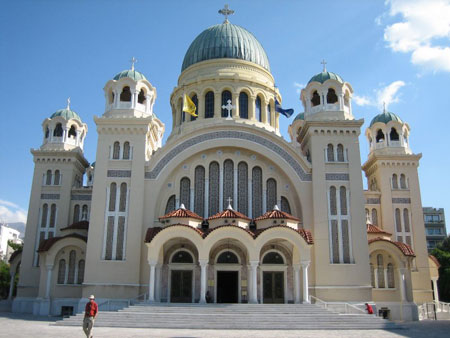
St. Andrew of Patras Greek Orthodox Cathedral in Patras, Greece

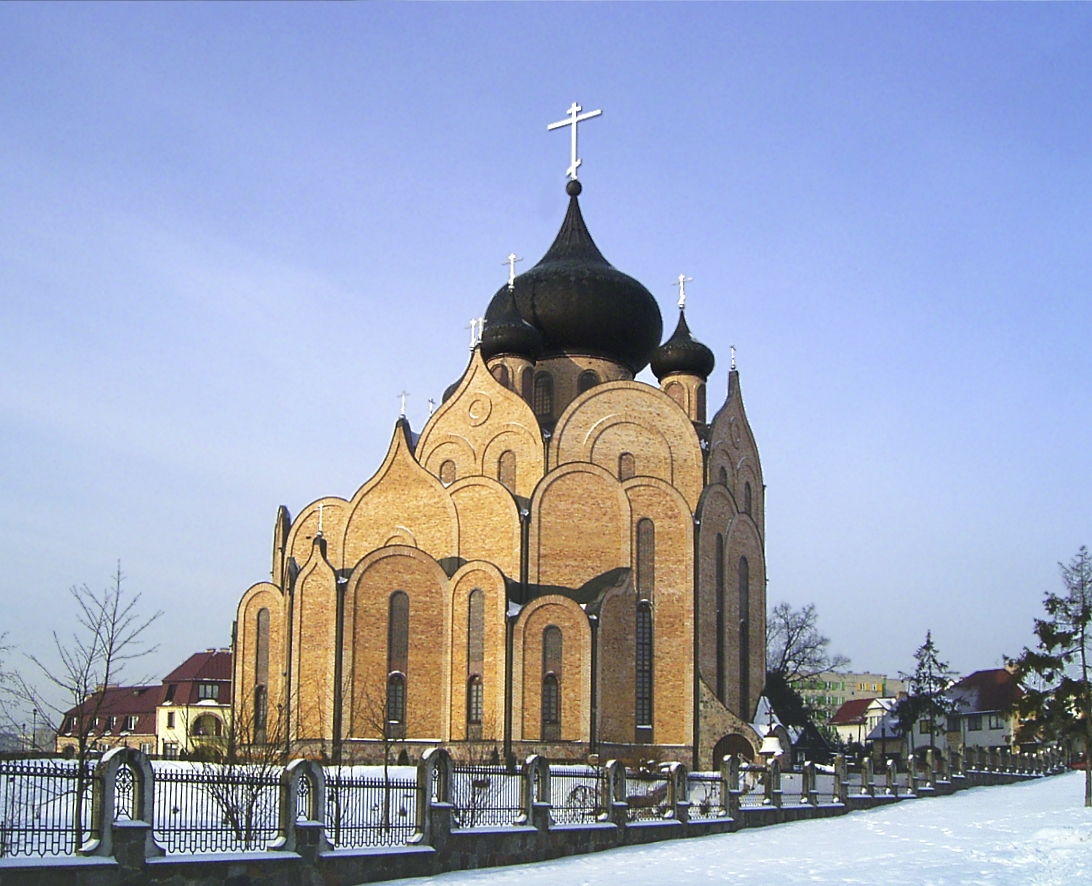
The Postmodern Church of the Holy Spirit in Białystok is the largest Orthodox house of worship in all of Poland.

In the Russian language (similar to other East Slavic languages) a general-purpose word for "church" is tserkov (церковь). When spoken in an exalted sense, the term khram (Храм), "temple", is used to refer to the church building as a Temple of God Khram Bozhy (Храм Божий). The words "church" and "temple", in this case are interchangeable; however, the term "church” (Greek: εκκλησία) is far more common in English. The term "temple" (Greek: ναός) is also commonly applied to larger churches. Some famous churches which are occasionally referred to as temples include Hagia Sophia, Saint Basil's Cathedral, the Cathedral of Christ the Saviour, and the Temple of Saint Sava.

Some churches have a special status and are referred to as sobor (or soborny khram, cоборный храм), from the Old Russian word for "gathering" (see sobor for other meanings). In Greek, diocesan sees are referred to as καθεδρικός ναός. In Russian, a cathedral is a "sobor" (Russian: кафедральный собор, kafedralny sobor). The seat of the patriarch is called a "patriarchal sobor" (Патриарший собор, Patriarshiy sobor). The main church of a monastery may also be called a "sobor". If a bishop builds a new sobor for his cathedra, the old church retains its status of a sobor. The status of sobor may be assigned only by the patriarch.

The major church in a monastery is called a katholikon, and may be reserved for major services, lesser services being celebrated in other churches in the monastery.

A church independent of local eparchy is called "stauropegial sobor" (Greek stauropegia means "mounting of the cross"). For example, patriarchal sobors are stauropigial ones.

Another kind of extra-eparchial churches are house churches, which belong to households.

== Architecture ==
Orthodox church buildings have the following basic shapes, each with its own symbolism:

- Elongated: rectangle, rounded rectangle (circle), symbolizing the ship as a means of salvation (Noah's Ark)
- Cruciform (cross shaped)
- Star shaped
- Circular

The cupola instead of a flat ceiling symbolizes the sky. In Russian churches, cupolas are often topped by onion-shaped domes, where crosses are mounted. These domes are called "heads" (глава) or "poppy heads" (маковица, маковка). Sometimes crosses have a crescent-like shape at the bottom, which contrary to the common misconception, has no relation either to Islam, or to a Christian victory over the Muslims. The crescent moon was one of the state symbols of Byzantium that predated the Ottoman conquests. The crescent moon found on Old Russian icons, vestments, and book miniatures refers to the moon as the symbol of anchor, the symbol of salvation, concordant with the symbolism of the church as a ship.

The altar (sanctuary) is situated in the eastern part of the church, regardless of its shape. A bell tower is attached to (or built separately by) the western part of the church.

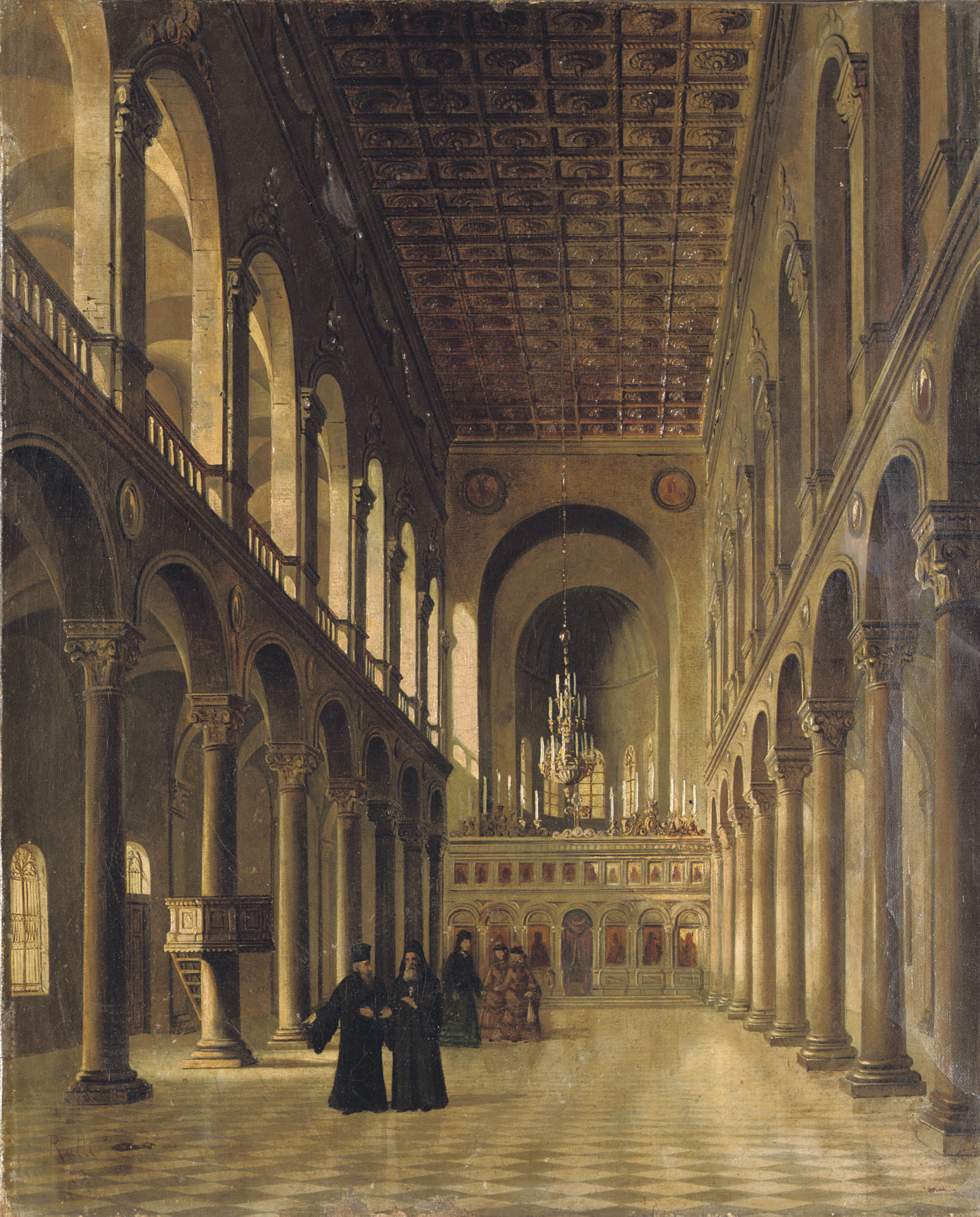
Interior of an Orthodox Church by Théodore Jacques Ralli c. 1873-1909

The church building has many symbolic meanings; perhaps the oldest and most prominent is the concept that the church is the Ark of Salvation (as in Noah's Ark) in which the world is saved from the flood of temptations. Because of this, most Orthodox churches are rectangular in design. Another popular shape, especially for churches with large choirs is cruciform or cross-shaped. Architectural patterns may vary in shape and complexity, with chapels sometimes added around the main church, or triple altars (Liturgy may only be performed once a day on any particular altar), but in general, the symbolic layout of the church remains the same.

The church building is divided into three main parts: the narthex (vestibule), the nave (the temple proper) and the sanctuary (also called the altar or holy place).

A major difference of traditional Orthodox churches from Western churches is the absence of any pews in the nave. In some ethnic traditions of Orthodoxy, it was deemed disrespectful to sit during sermons. However, in some churches in the West and particularly in the diaspora churches in the United States, pews and kneelers were introduced, under the influence of other Christian denominations.

=== Narthex ===
The narthex is the connection between the church and the outside world and for this reason catechumens (pre-baptized Orthodox) and non-Orthodox are to stand here (note: the tradition of allowing only confirmed Orthodox into the nave of the church has for the most part fallen into disuse). In monastic churches, it is usual for the lay people visiting the monastery to stand in the narthex while the monks or nuns stand in the nave.

=== Nave ===
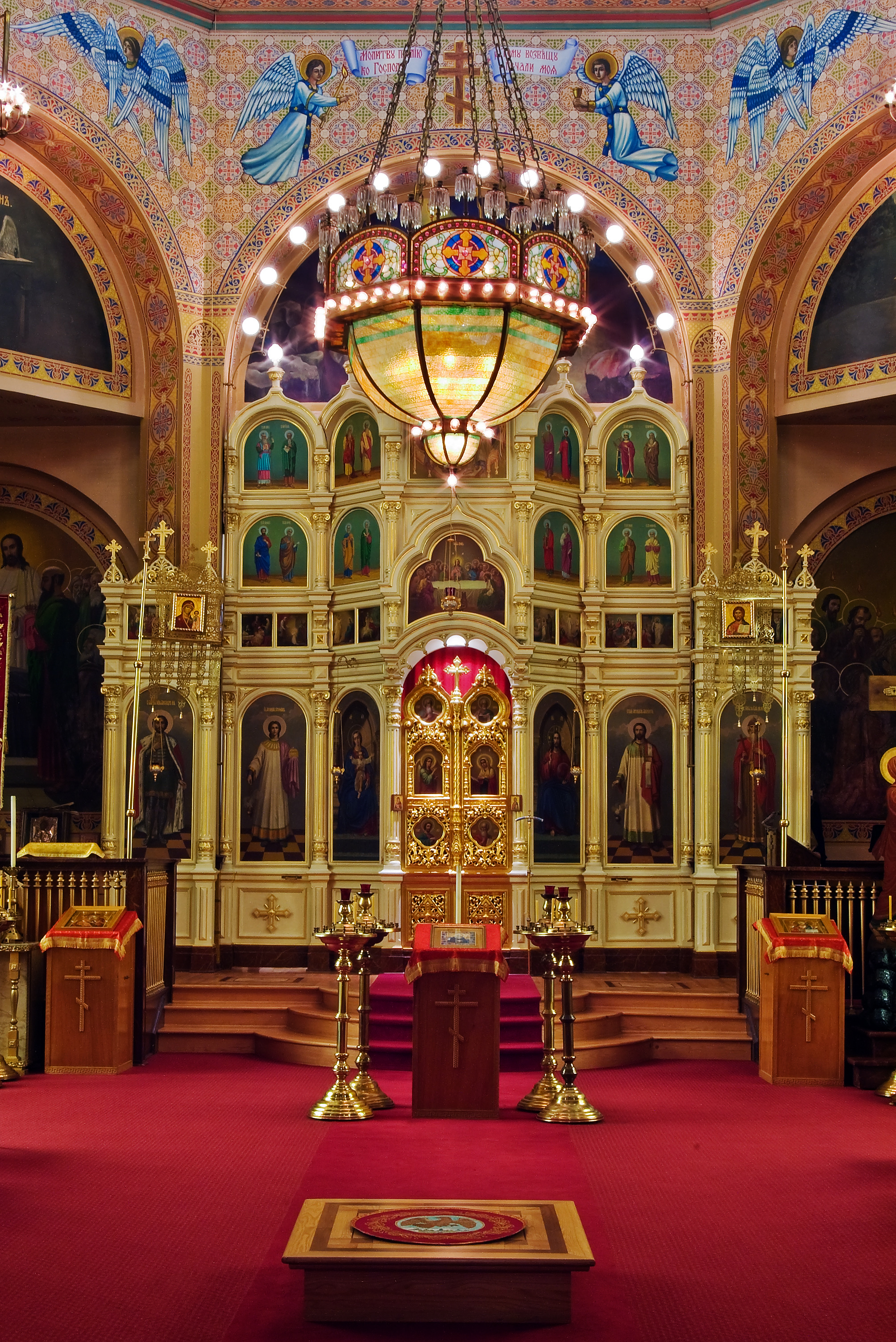
A view of the nave in the Russian Orthodox Cathedral of the Holy Trinity in Chicago (designed by Louis Sullivan)

The nave is the main body of the church where the people stand during the services. In most traditional Eastern Orthodox churches there are no seats or pews as in the West, but rather stacidia (A high-armed chair with arm rests high enough to be used for support while standing); these are usually found along the walls. Traditionally there is no sitting during services with the only exceptions being during the reading of the Psalms, and the priest's sermon. However, many exceptions to this can be found in Western countries, especially the United States, where familiarity with Catholic and Protestant churches has led to similarities in church furnishings. It is not uncommon to encounter both pews and kneelers.

In some more traditional churches, mostly in Greece, a special chandelier known as a polyeleos can be found. This chandelier is usually adorned with candles and icons and is pushed to swing during its respective service.

The walls are normally covered from floor to ceiling with icons or wall paintings of saints, their lives, and stories from the Bible. Because the church building is a direct extension of its Jewish roots where men and women stand separately, the Orthodox church continues this practice, with men standing on the right and women on the left. With this arrangement it is emphasized that we are all equal before God (equal distance from the altar), and that the man is not superior to the woman. In many modern churches this traditional practice has been altered and families stand together.

Above the nave in the dome of the church is the icon of Christ the Almighty (Παντοκρατωρ/Pantokrator, "Ruler of All"). Directly hanging below the dome (In more traditional churches) is usually a kind of circular chandelier with depictions of the saints and apostles, called the horos, which is the same as the polyeleos mentioned above.

The nave of an Orthodox church can vary in shape/size and layout according to the various traditions within the Church. The two most common layouts inside Orthodox churches since Justinian have been a cruciform layout, an open square/rectangular layout, or a more linear layout with side-aisles. However, the latter of which has fallen out of use since the Great Schism, as it was more widely used in Western churches and better suited the services celebrated in them than in Eastern Rite churches. The two former layouts, the open square (or rarely, circular) and the cruciform have been found best suited to celebration of the Divine Liturgy. These two interior layouts tend to be square/circular in form rather than elongated.

The cruciform is the oldest of the two interior layouts and seems to be of Byzantine origin. It comes from the adaptation of two of the earliest Christian architectural forms, the basilica and the octagonal/circular form. The cruciform church often includes side-aisles similar to the Western basilica, but they are often very short and cut open in the middle, leaving a large cross shape through the middle of the church. The open square/circle is the newer of the two forms. It is most commonly found in Eastern European churches and more modern Greek churches. This church retains the earlier square/circular shape; however, the side-aisles have been removed, thus opening the space completely. This has found wider use across the world in more recent years with the invention of steel, as it allows for the dome to be supported without the need for massive arches and columns which were main features of the older cruciform churches.

=== Iconostasis ===
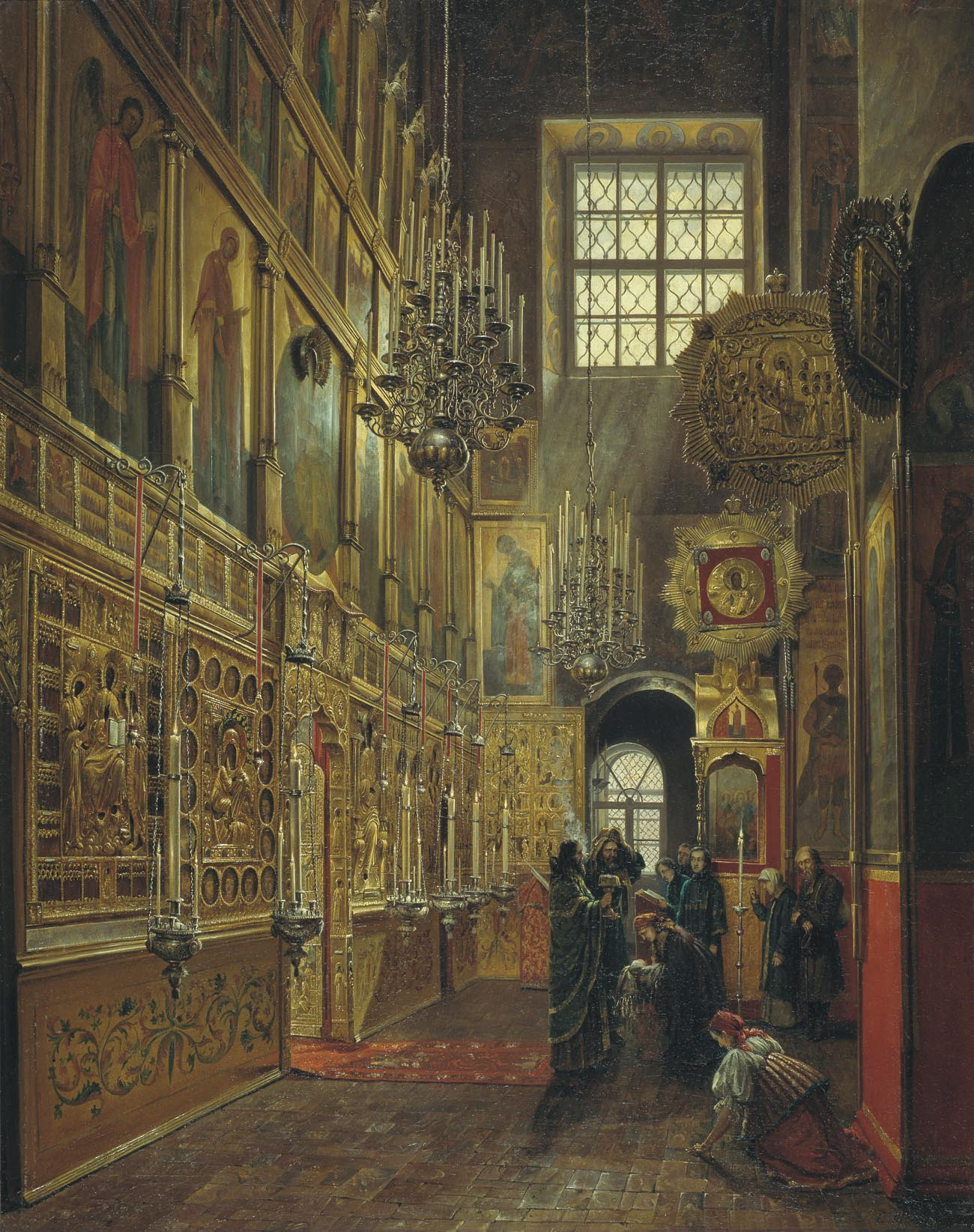
A depiction of the front of an iconostasis from Stepan Shukhvostov's Church of St. Alexis in the Chudov Monastery of the Moscow Kremlin

The iconostasis, also called the τεμπλον/templon, it is a screen or wall between the nave and the sanctuary, which is covered with icons. There will normally be three doors, one in the middle and one on either side. The central one is traditionally called the Beautiful Gate or Royal Doors (either because Christ passes through them in the liturgy, or from the time of the Byzantine Empire, when the emperor would enter the main body of Hagia Sophia, the Church of Holy Wisdom, through these doors and proceed up to the altar to partake of the Eucharist). On either side of this portal are large brass candlestands called menalia which represent the pillars of fire which went before the Hebrews into the promised land. Royal doors are only used by the clergy. There are times when this gate is closed during the service and a curtain is drawn. The doors on either side are called the Deacons' Doors or Angel Doors as they often have depicted on them the Archangels Michael and Gabriel. These doors are used by deacons and servers to enter the sanctuary.

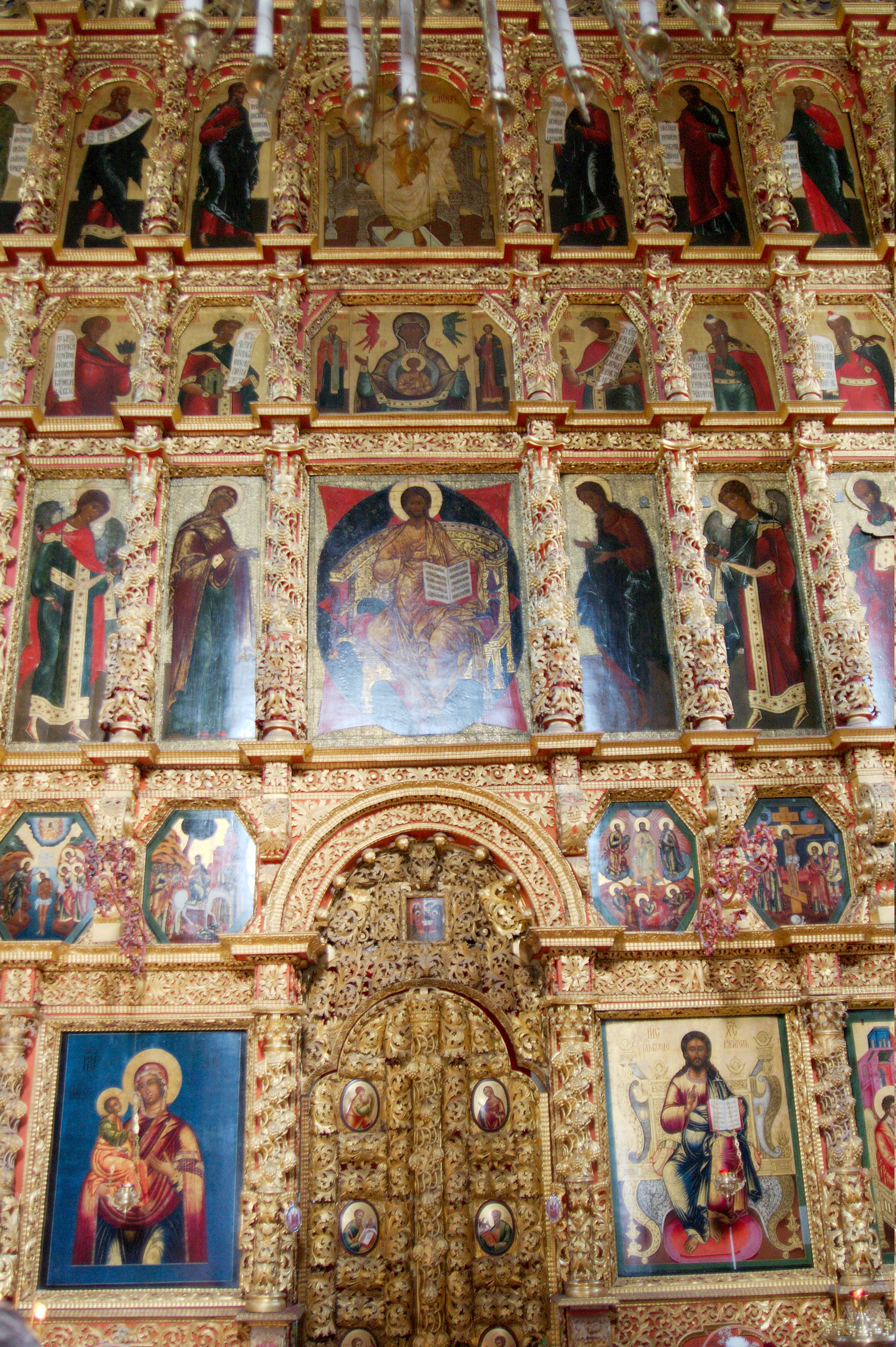
Mid-17th-century iconostasis at Ipatiev Monastery. To either side of the Holy Doors are Christ Pantokrator and the Theotokos; above them, the Great Feasts; above them, the Deesis; above that Prophets to either side of Our Lady of the Sign; above them the Apostles to either side of the Holy Trinity.

Typically, to the right of the Beautiful Gate (as viewed from the nave) is the icon of Christ, then the icon of St. John the Baptist; to the left the icon of the Theotokos, always shown holding Christ; and then the icon of the saint to whom the church is dedicated (i.e., the patron). There are often other icons on the iconostasis, but these vary from church to church. The curtain is also drawn and opened at various points in the service.

=== Sanctuary ===
The area behind the iconostasis reached through the Beautiful Gates or Angel Doors is the sanctuary or altar. Within this area is the altar table, which is more often called the holy table or throne; the apse containing the high place at the center back with a throne for the bishop and the synthronos, or seats for the priests, on either side; the Chapel of Prothesis on the north side where the offerings are prepared in the Proskomedia before being brought to the altar table and the holy vessels are stored; and the Diaconicon on the south side where the vestments are stored.

Orthodox Altars are usually square. Traditionally they have a heavy brocade outer covering that reaches all the way to the floor. Occasionally they have canopies over them. All Eastern Orthodox altars have a saint's relics embedded inside them, usually that of a martyr, placed at the time they are consecrated. Atop the altar table at the center toward the back is an ornate container usually called the tabernacle where the reserved Eucharistic elements are stored for communion of the sick. It is often shaped like a model of a church building. In front of this is placed the Gospel book, which usually has a decorated metal cover. Under the gospel is a folded piece of cloth called the eiliton. Folded within the eiliton is the antimension, which is a silken cloth imprinted with a depiction of the burial of Christ and with relics sewn into it. Both these cloths are unfolded before the offerings are placed on the altar table. Behind the altar is a seven-branched candlestick, which recalls the seven-branched candlestick of the Old Testament Tabernacle and Temple in Jerusalem. Behind this is a golden processional cross. On either side of the cross are liturgical fans (Greek: ripidia or hexapteryga) which represent the six-winged Seraphim. Against the wall behind the altar is a large cross. Hanging from the cross is usually a flat iconographic depiction of Christ (corpus) which can be removed during the 50 days following Pascha (Easter).

Traditionally, no animal products other than wool and beeswax are allowed in the sanctuary/altar. In theory, this prohibition covers leather (in the form of leather-bound service-books and shoes), but this is not always enforced today. Money is also forbidden. None may enter the altar without a blessing from the priest or bishop, and personal jewelry, such as rings and earrings, is not worn by those serving there.

== Gallery ==
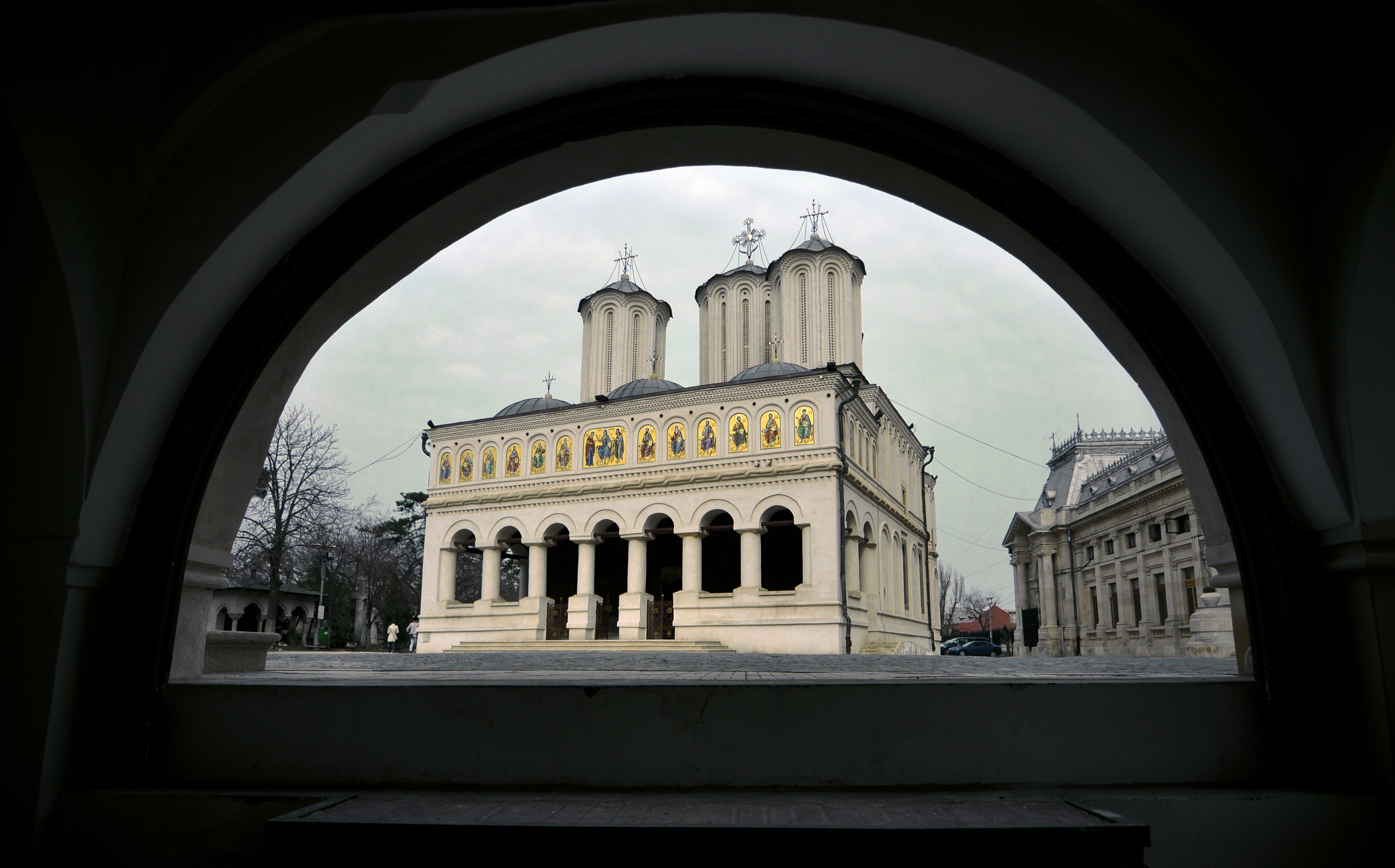
Romanian Patriarchal Cathedral in Bucharest, completed in 1658, Romania.

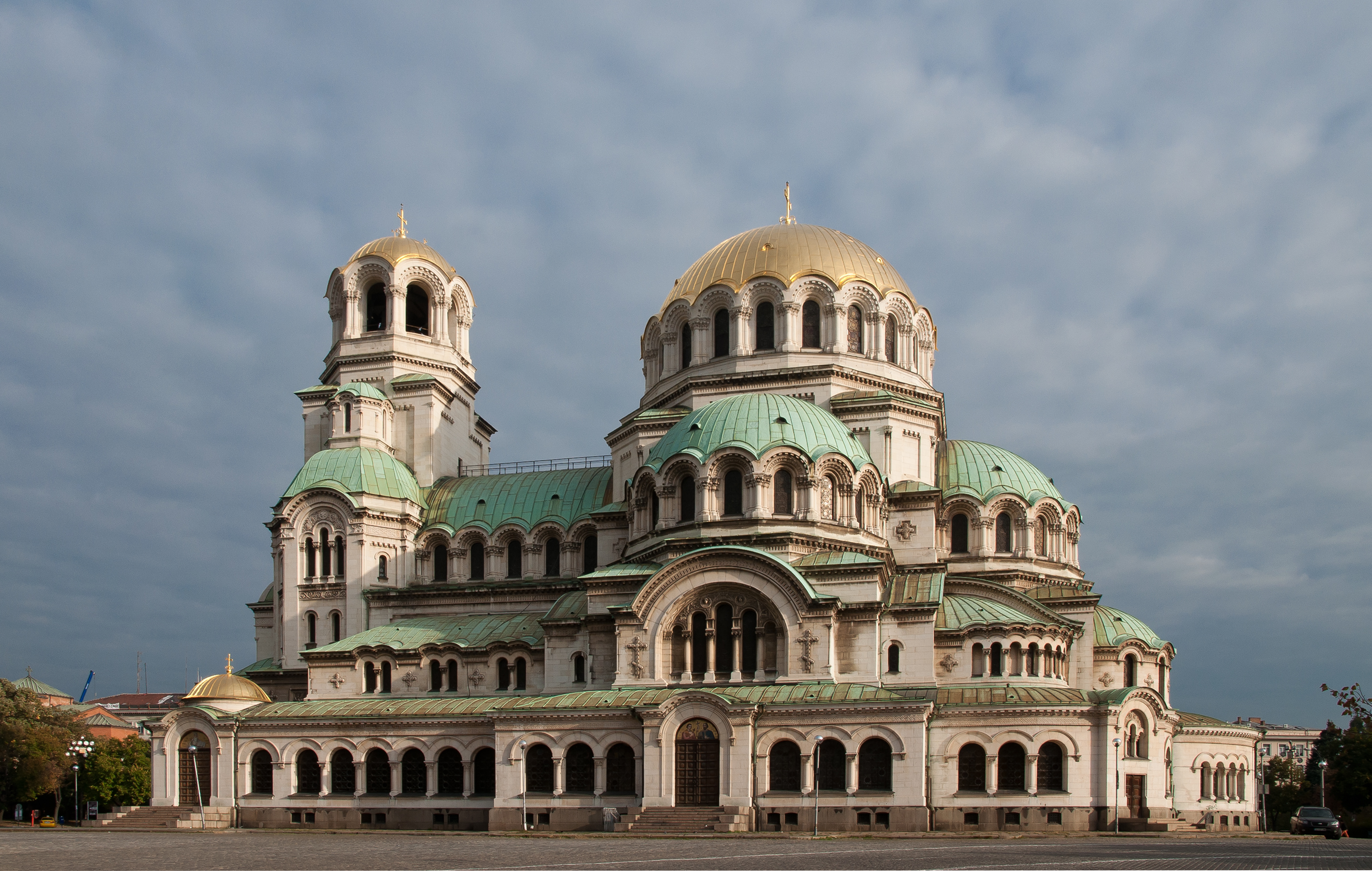
The Alexander Nevsky Cathedral in Sofia, Bulgaria.

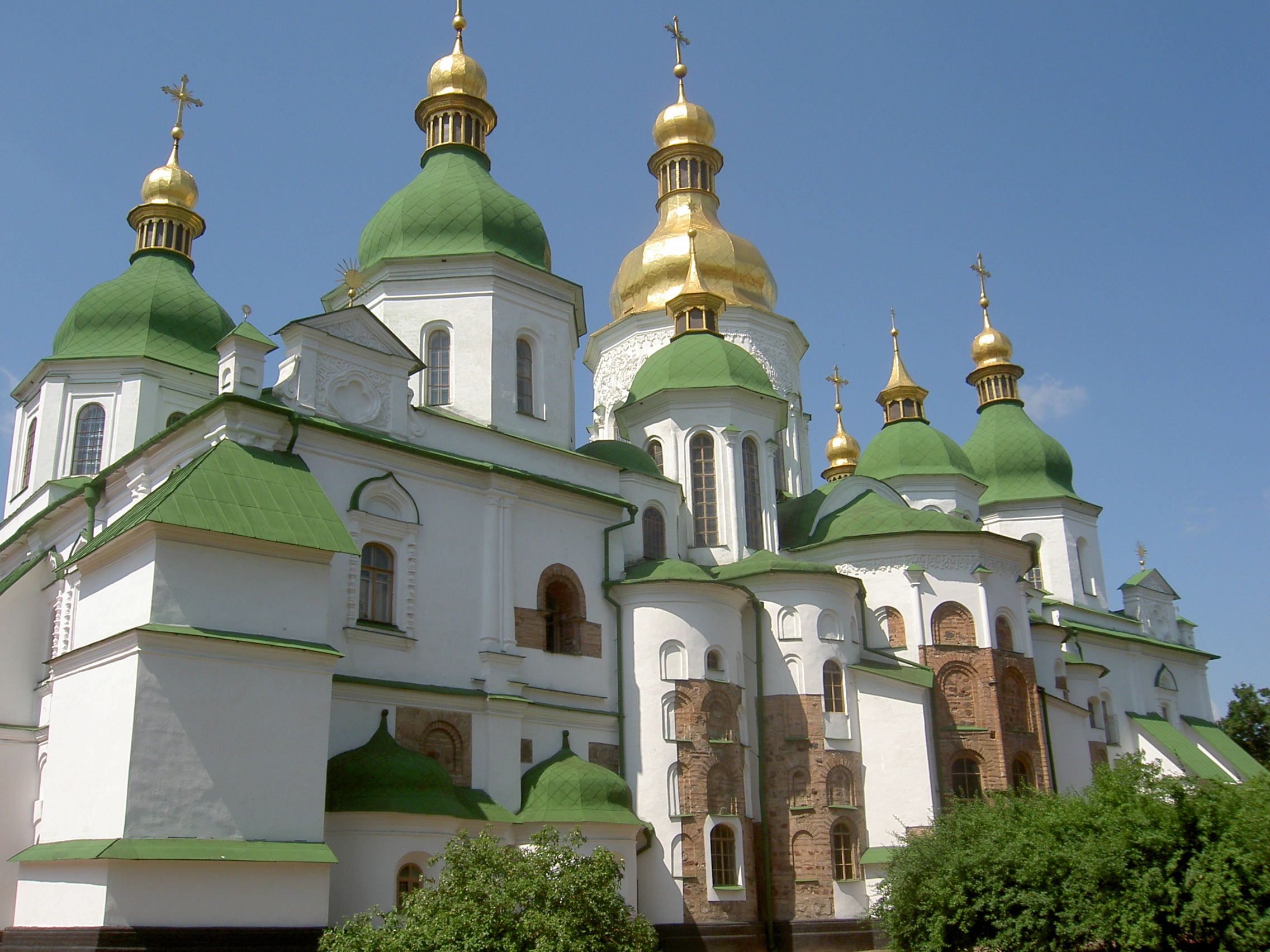
The Saint Sophia Cathedral in Kyiv, Ukraine.

The Alexander Nevsky Cathedral in Łódź was built through the contributions of the city's mercantilist elite as well as the Tsar of Russia.

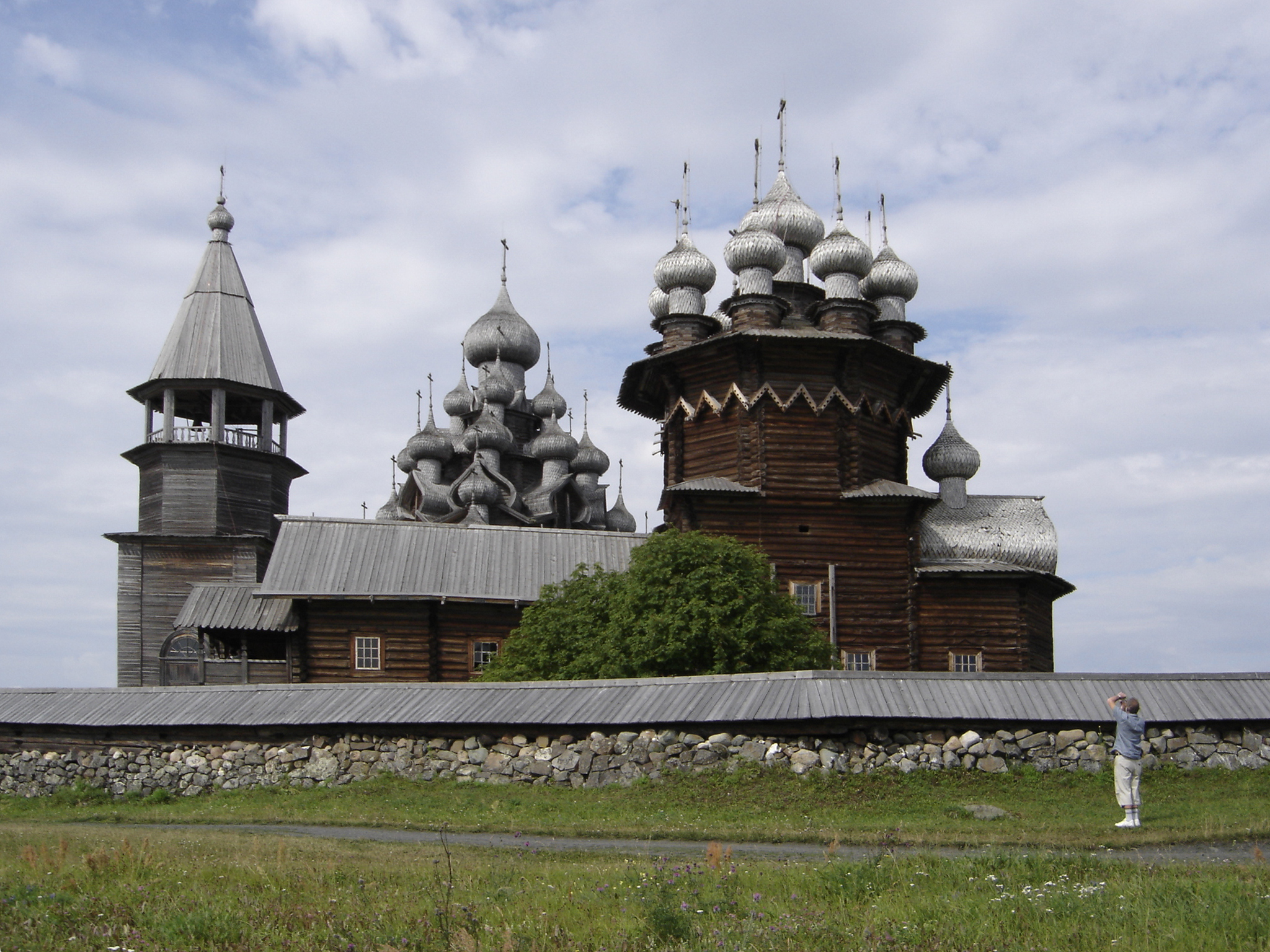
A "wooden miracle" of Kizhi, part of an ensemble of wooden churches, chapels and houses. It is one of the most popular tourist destinations in Russia and an UNESCO World Heritage Site.

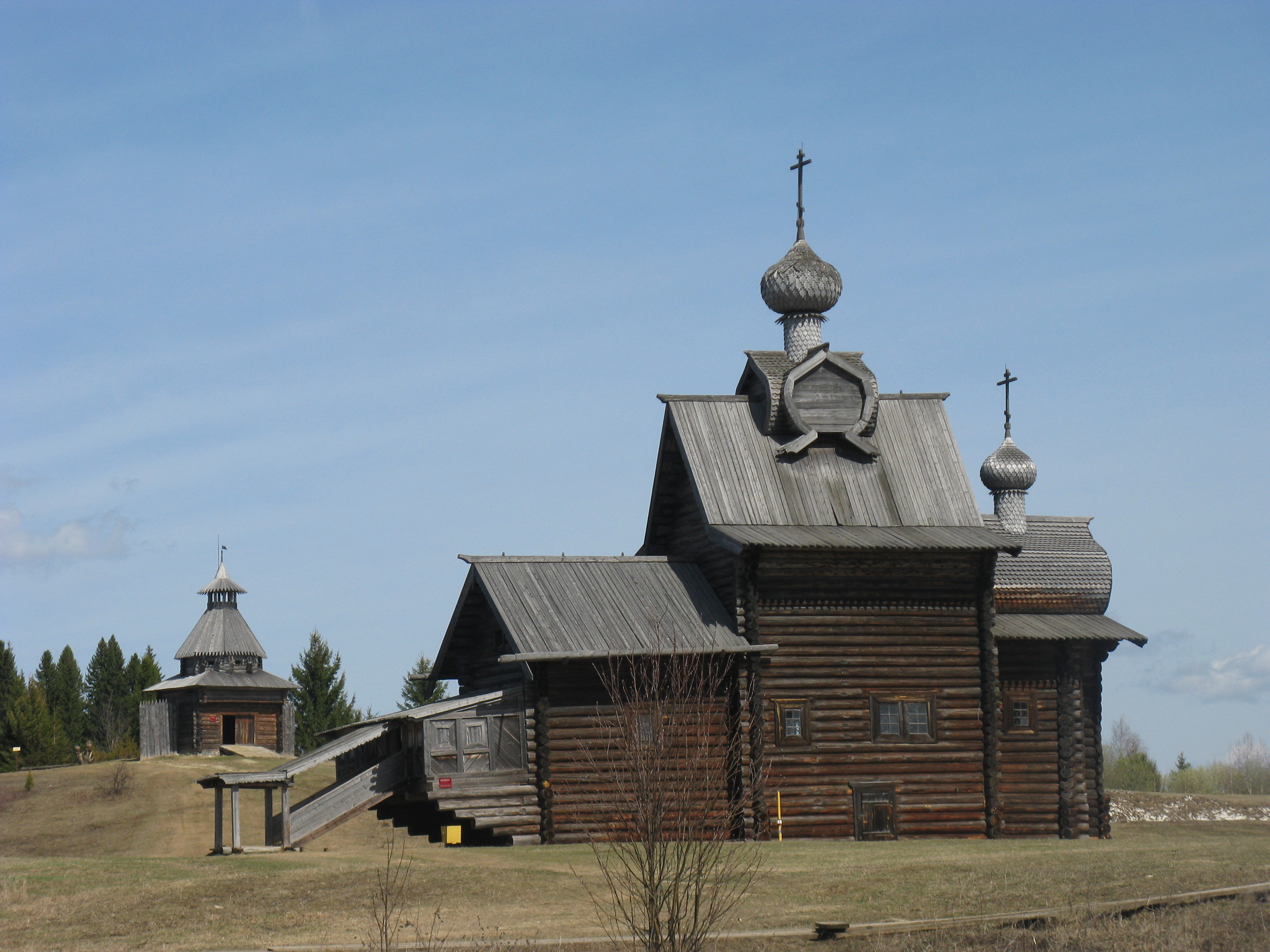
Architectural-ethnographic museum "Khokhlovka" in Perm Krai. Church of Transformation of the Lord (1707) and a watchtower (17th century).

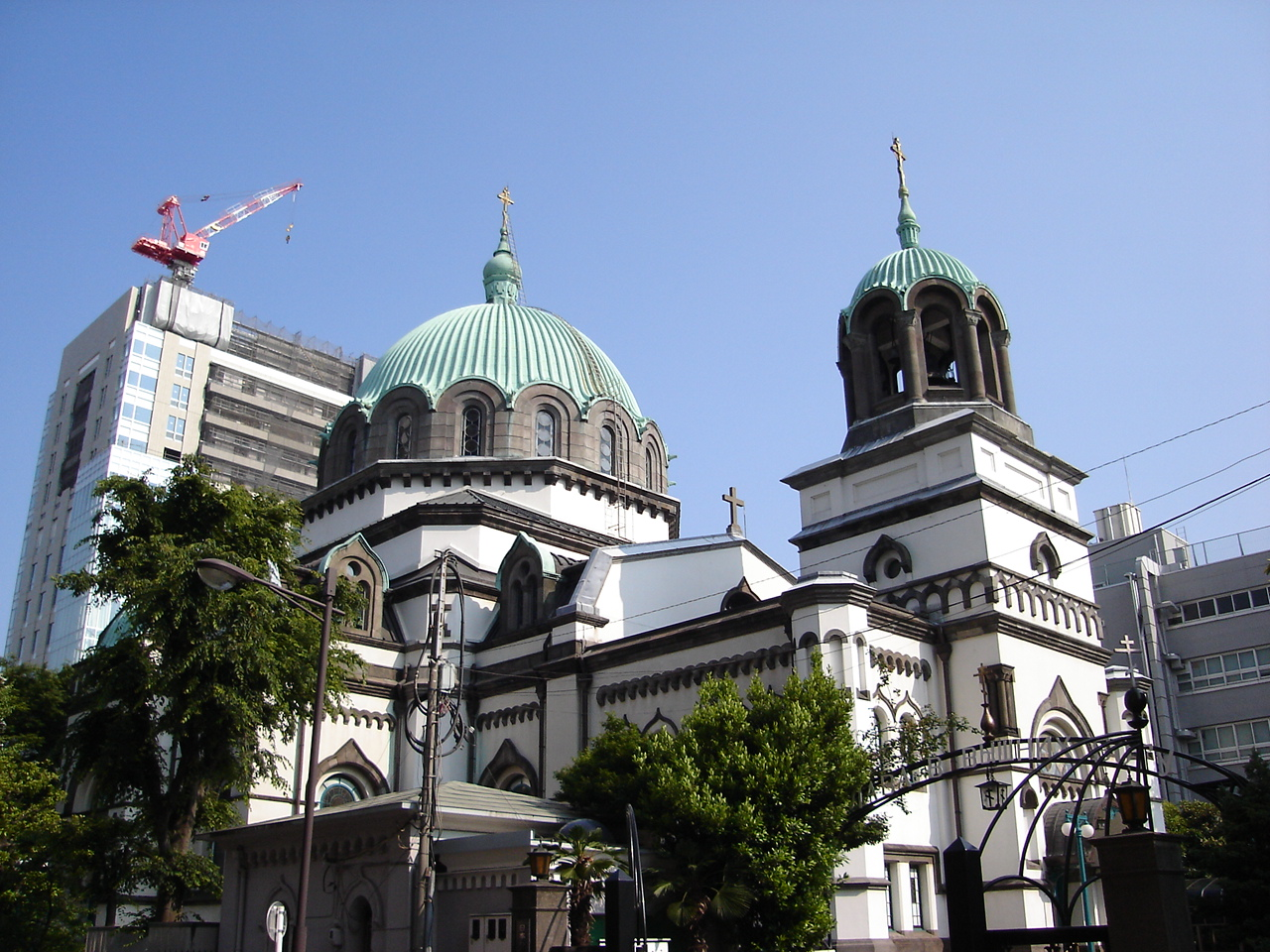
Tokyo Resurrection Cathedral (Japanese: Nicorai-do, after Nikolai of Japan).

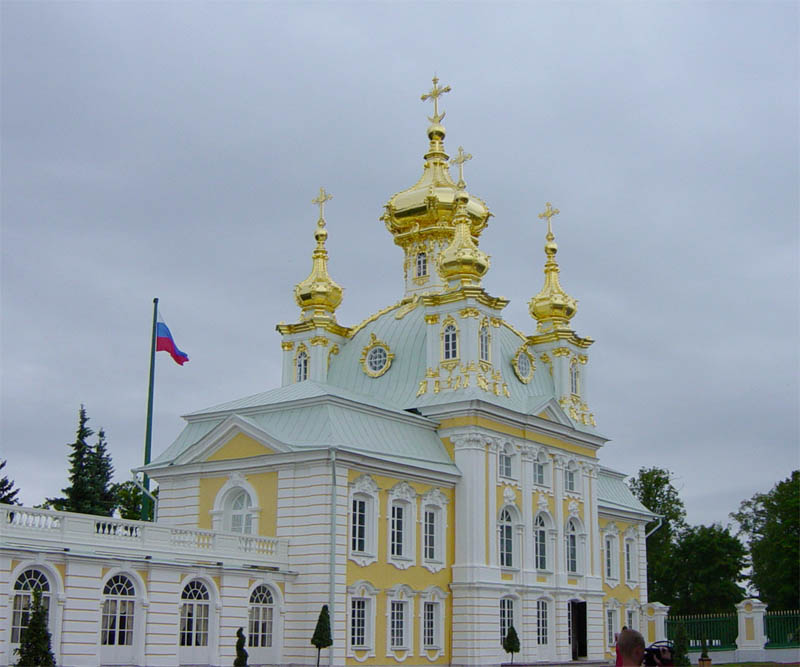
A wing of Peterhof Palace near Saint Petersburg houses a private Orthodox chapel of the Russian tsars.

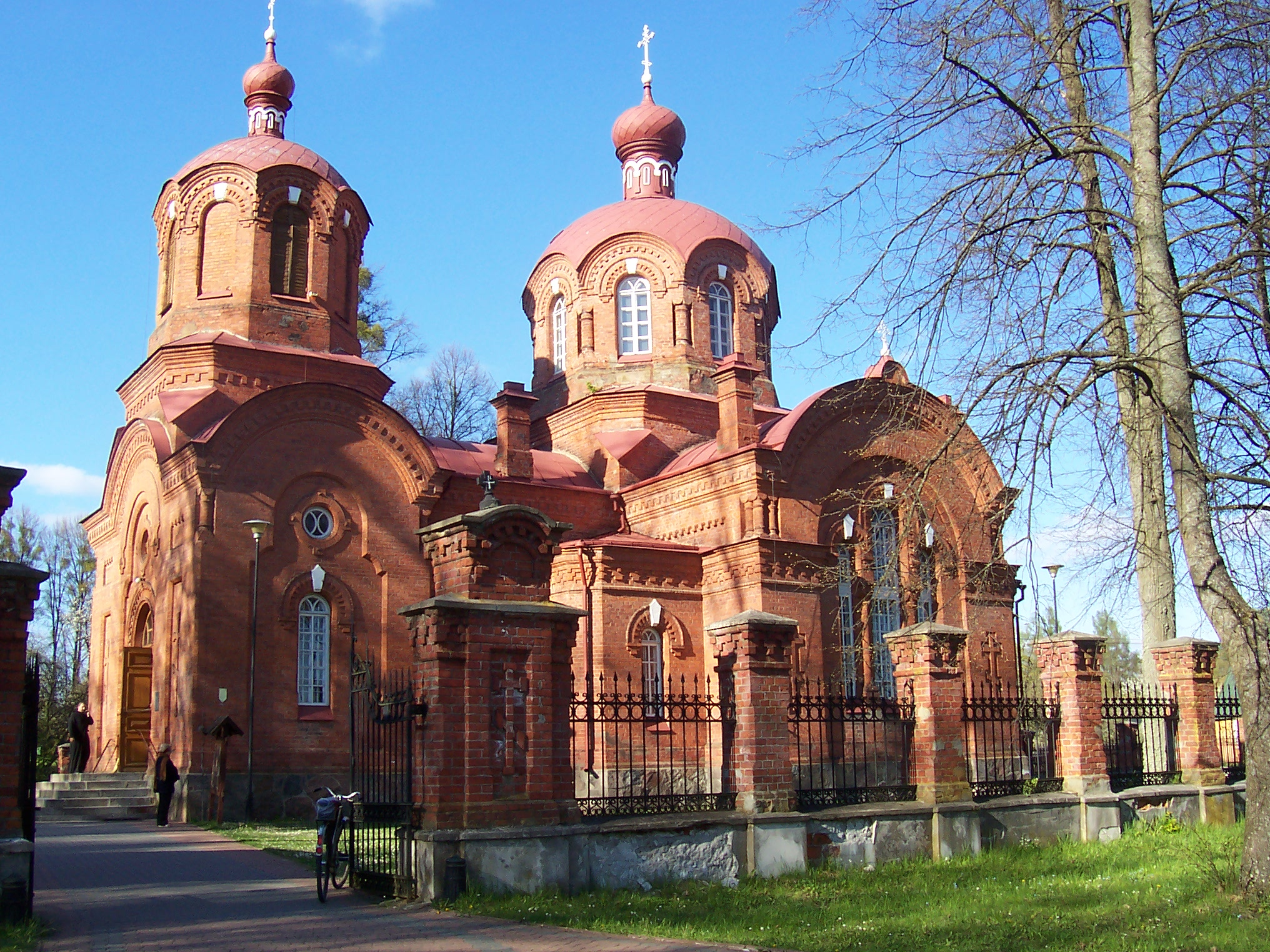
The Orthodox Church in Białowieża, Poland, on the edge of the Białowieża Primaeval Forest.

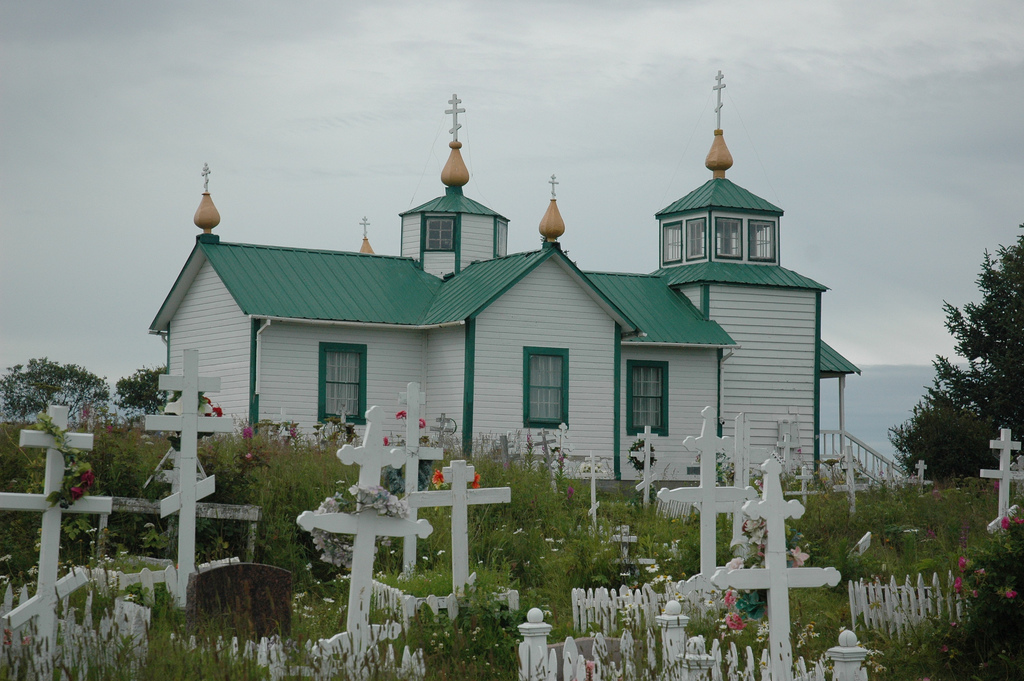
Orthodox churches are common in Alaska, particularly in the southern and southwest portions of the state.

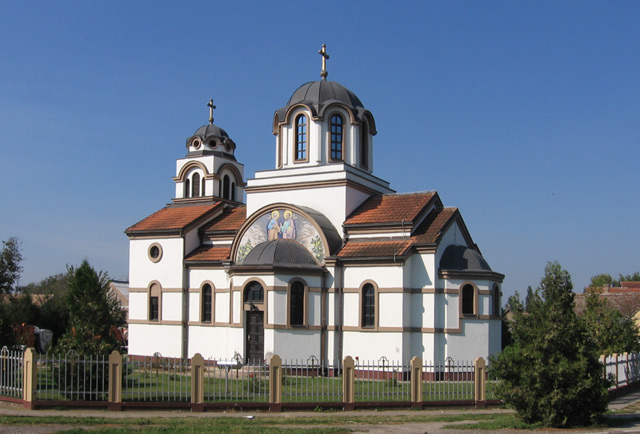
A Serbian Orthodox church in Nocaj, Vojvodina

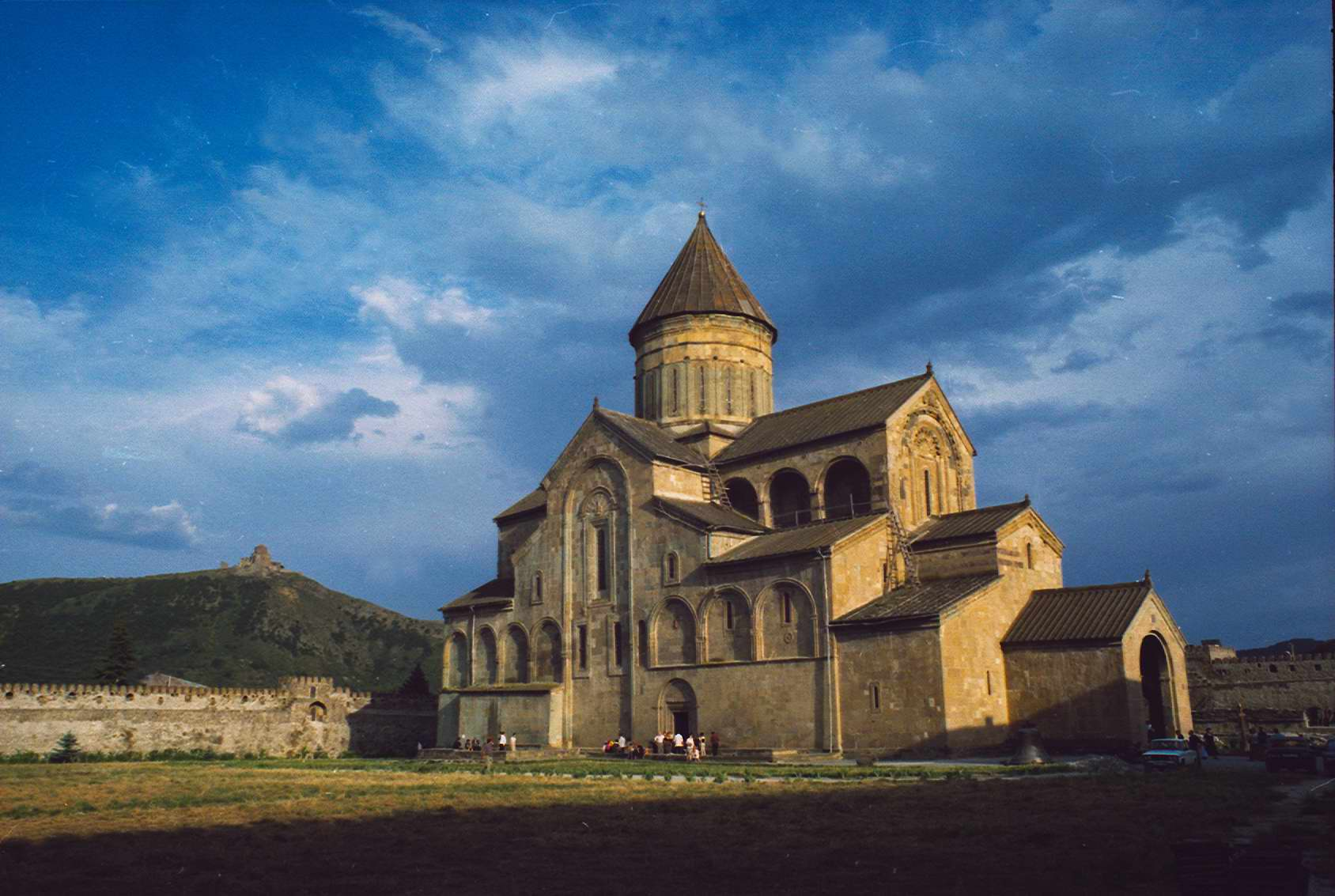
Svetitskhoveli Cathedral A Georgian Orthodox church in Mtskheta Georgia Between 1010 and 1029.It is one of the most popular tourist destinations in Georgia and an UNESCO World Heritage Site.

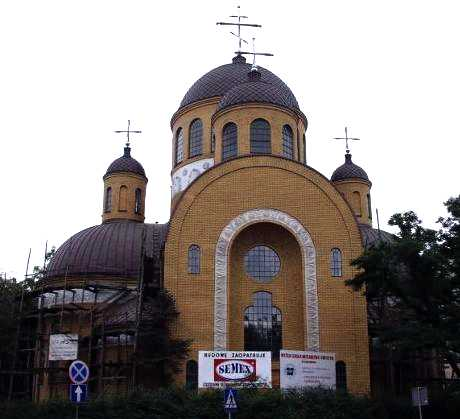
The Orthodox Church of the Icon of Our Lady of Częstochowa is a Polish Orthodox church in Częstochowa honoring the Icon of Our Lady of Częstochowa, considered to be one of the country's national symbols.

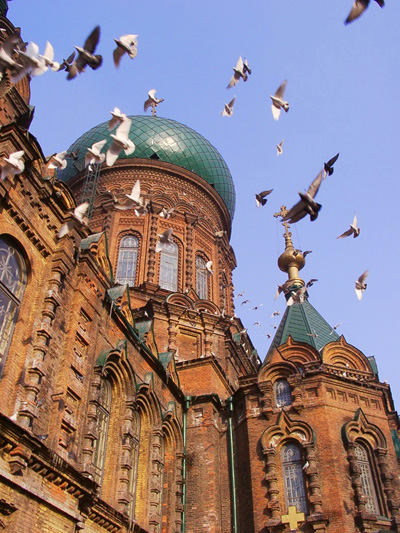
The Russian Orthodox Church of Saint Sofia in Harbin, China.

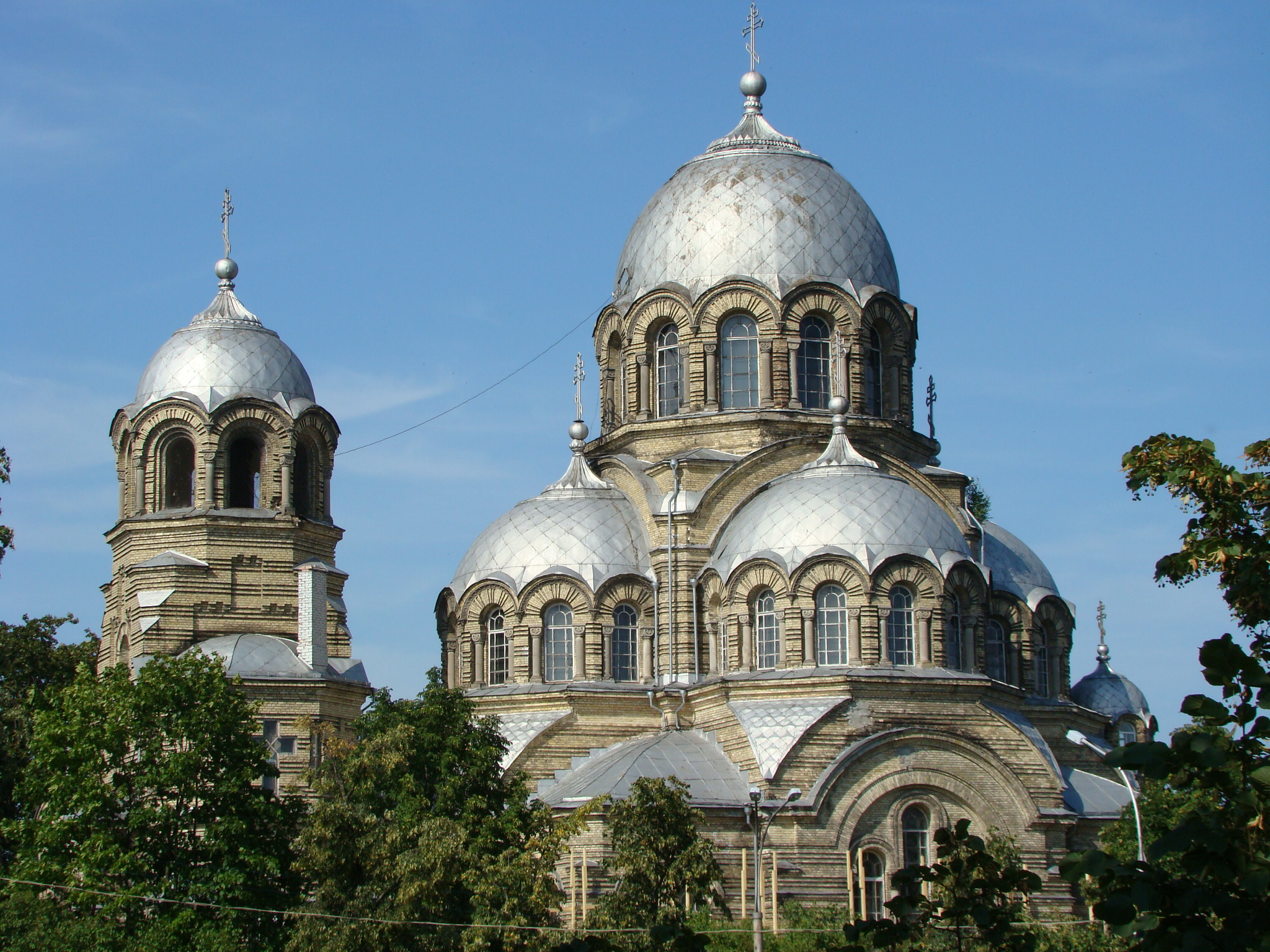
The church of the Theotokos Orans (Our Lady of the Sign) in Vilnius demonstrates typical features of developed Byzantine revival: exposed two-tone, striped, masonry; four symmetrical apses tightly fused into the main dome, creating a tall triangular outline; arcades blending into the domes; and a relatively small belltower, clearly subordinate to the main dome.

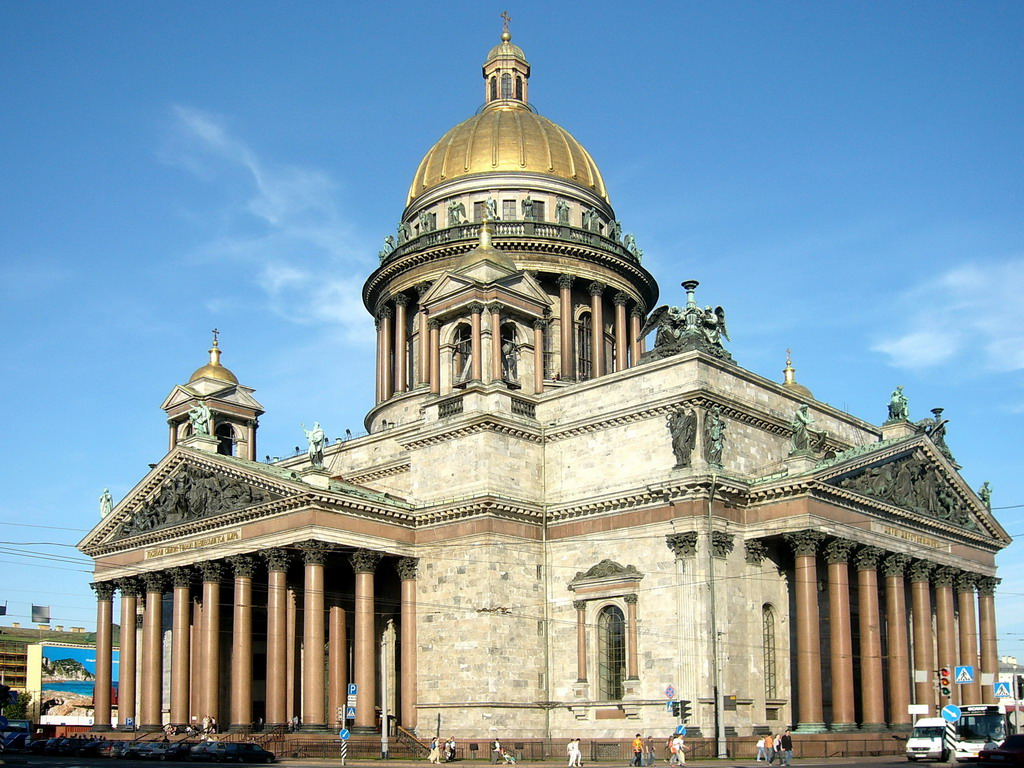
Saint Isaac's Cathedral in Saint Petersburg, the most famous example of an Orthodox church built in a Neoclassical style.

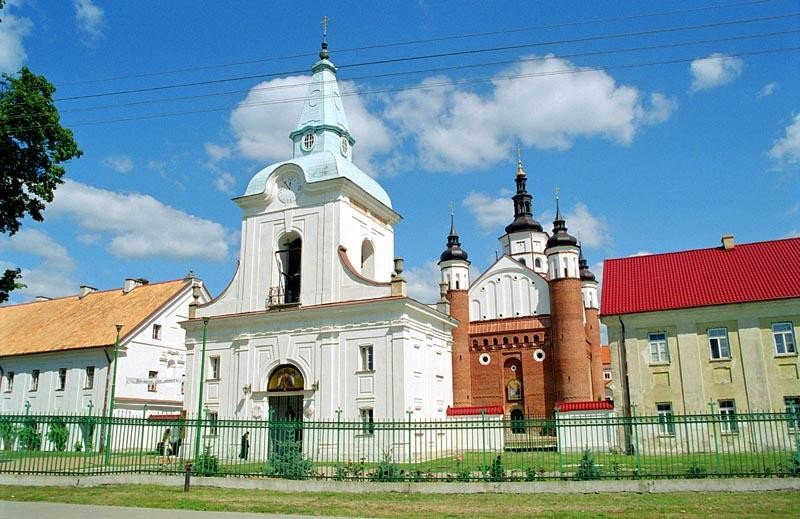
The Supraśl Lavra is undergoing conservation work since the revolutions of 1989, when the Polish government returned it to the Polish Autocephalous Orthodox Church.

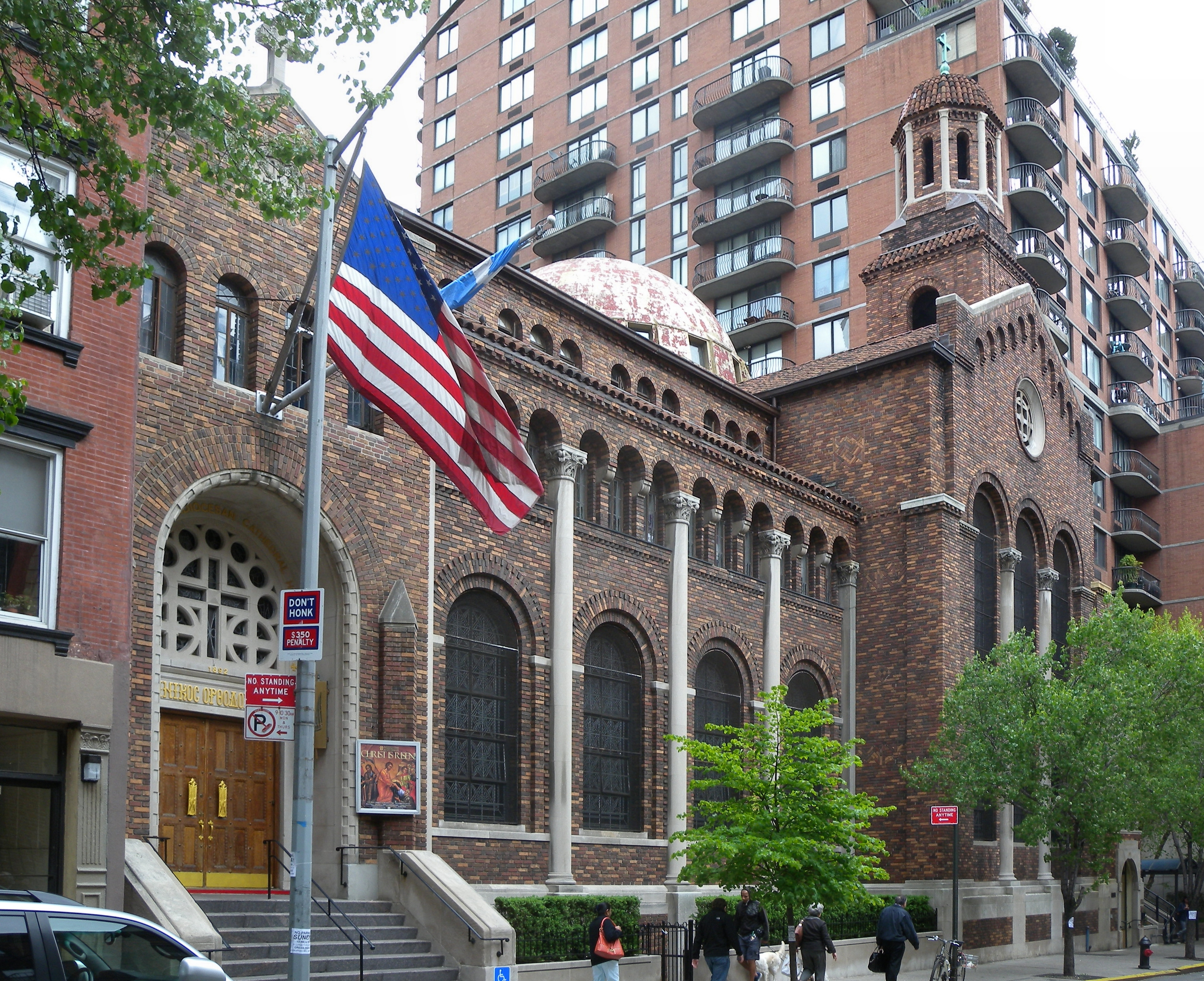
The Archdiocesan Cathedral of the Holy Trinity on New York City's Upper East Side, the largest Orthodox Christian church in the Western Hemisphere.

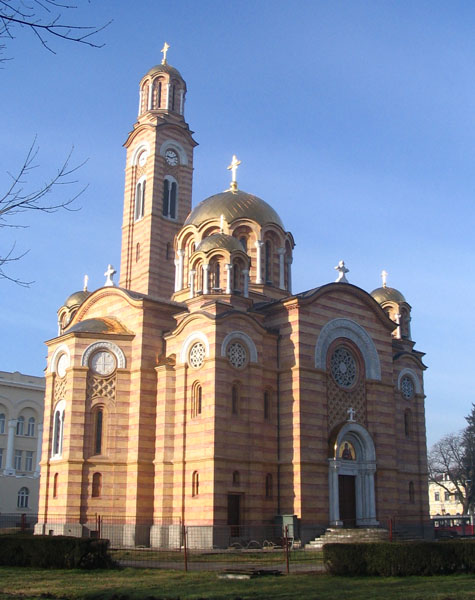
The Cathedral of Christ the Saviour in Banja Luka, Bosnia and Herzegovina, was built from natural-coloured stone imported from Mesopotamia, and with golden cupolas.

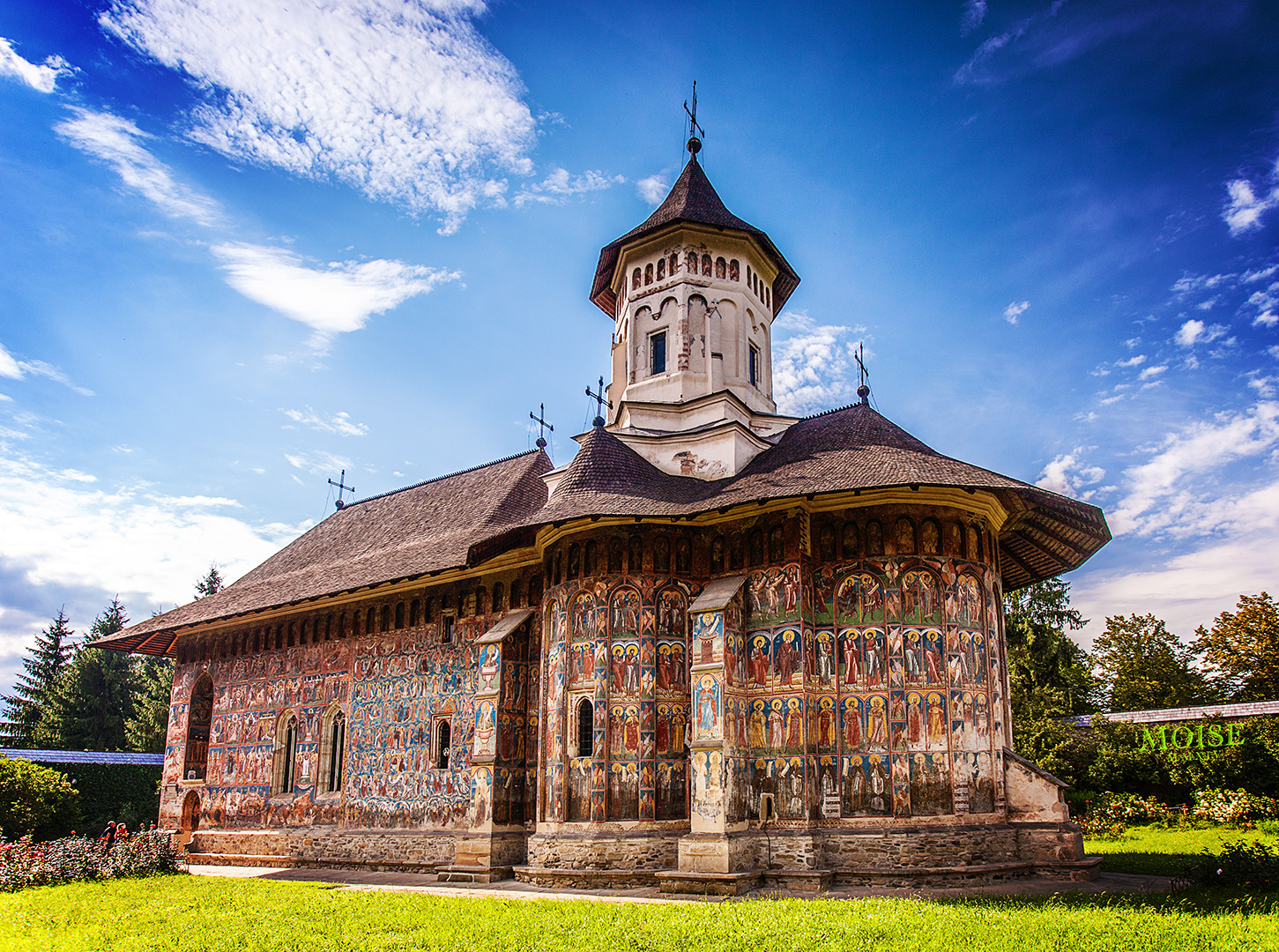
Annunciation Church of Moldovița Monastery, one of the eight painted churches of Moldavia, Romania, is listed by UNESCO as a World Heritage Site.

== See also ==
- Early Christian art and architecture
- Babinets (architecture)
- Cross-in-square
- Morava architectural school
- Raška architectural school
- Moldavian style
- Brâncovenesc style
- Wooden churches of Maramureş
- List of tallest Orthodox churches
- List of Eastern Orthodox monasteries
- Armenian church architecture
- Coptic architecture
- Wooden Tserkvas of the Carpathian Region in Poland and Ukraine
- Symbolism of domes
