= Orthodox Church of the Icon of Our Lady of Częstochowa =

Eastern Orthodox church in Poland

Coordinates: 50°48′30″N 19°06′51″E

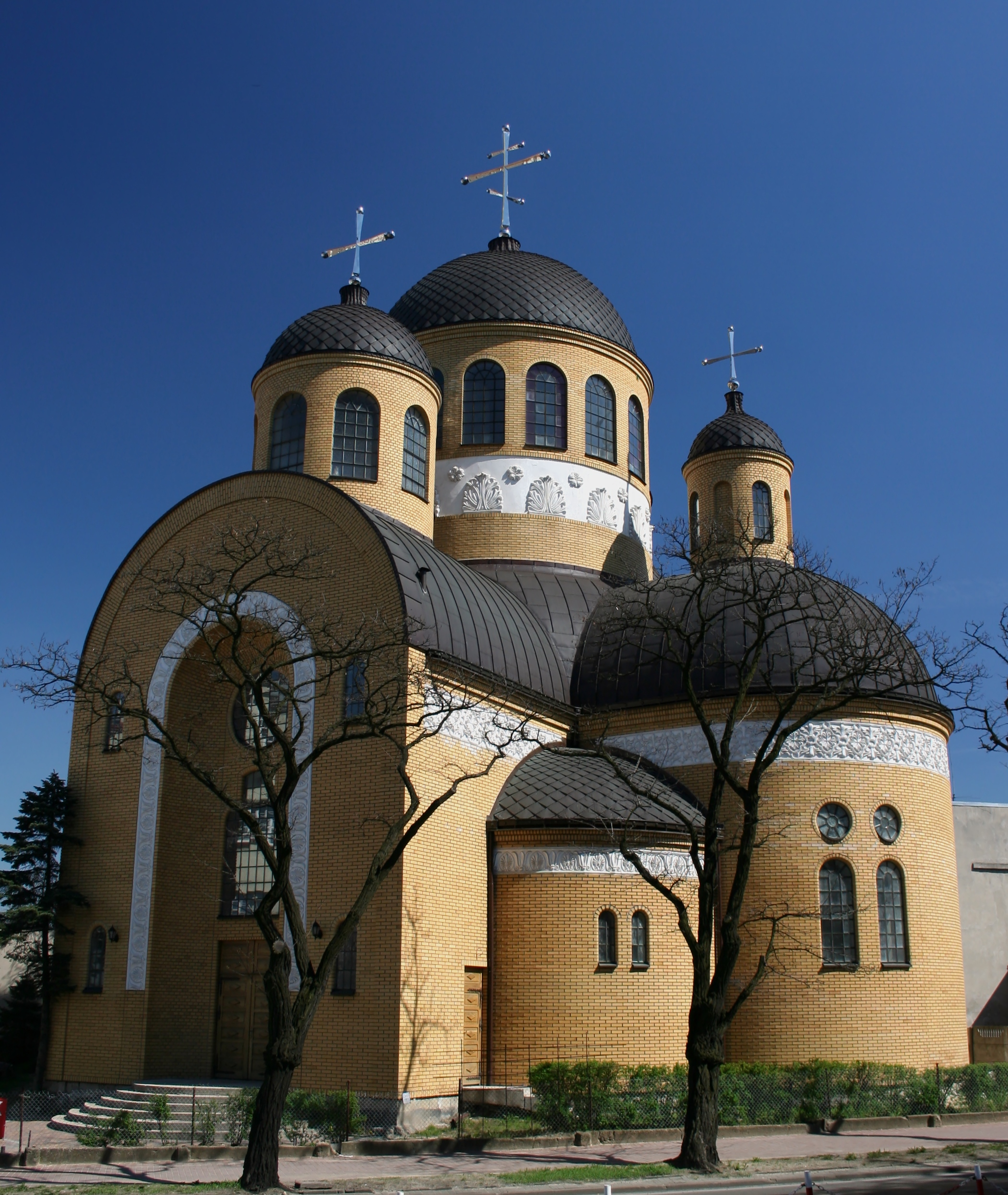
A view of the church.

The Orthodox Church of the Icon of Our Lady of Częstochowa (Polish: Cerkiew Częstochowskiej Ikony Matki Bożej w Częstochowie) is an Eastern Orthodox church in Częstochowa, Poland that honors the Icon of Our Lady of Częstochowa, one of the country's national symbols. Construction of the building commenced in 1994 according to a design by Michał Bałasz of Białystok. As of 2009, the church is mostly complete. The bells and windows had been installed, and the facade completed. Work on the internal decoration of the building still remains largely unfinished. The cornerstone was blessed by the Ecumenical Patriarch Bartholomew I.
