= Timeline of 1980s political violence and sabotage acts in Bulgaria =

The destroyed train carriage after the March 9, 1985 attack in Bunovo.

There was a wave of political violence and acts of sabotage in the communist-led People's Republic of Bulgaria (PRB) during the 1980s. Many of the attacks took place in the context of the heightened assimilation policies carried out by the Bulgarian government at the time.

== Background ==
The PRB was a communist satellite state of the Soviet Union, and for most of the 1980s, this state was led by Todor Zhivkov. The PRB enforced its rule through an internal security service headed by the Committee for State Security (DS). The Bulgarian government during the 1980s was subsequently described as "totalitarian" by the post-communist National Assembly of Bulgaria in 2012.

This government had implemented a number of assimilation policies and cultural restrictions directed at Muslim groups. While the most notable wave of forced assimilation, the Revival Process, did not begin until Gregorian Christmas, 1984, by that time, many already anticipated the government's desire to implement assimilation measures like the Revival Process. Though it had avoided implementing particularly strict assimilation policies targeting its substantial Turkish minority since the events of the early 1950s, measures such as restrictions on Turkish religious and cultural practices had been implemented. So, while there were attacks carrier out prior to start of the Revival Process, those carried out by groups targeted by the Revival Process increased from 1984.

== Attacks and acts of sabotage ==
=== 1981 ===
- May 24, 1981 – Burgas – A group hijacked a plane en-route to Ankara from Istanbul and landed in Bulgaria, with the hijackers demanding a ransom of $500,000. The plane was stormed by Bulgarian and Turkish commandos, resulting in the death of one militant and the capture of the others.

=== 1982 ===
- September 9, 1982 – Burgas – Turkish diplomat Bora Suelkan was killed with a handgun. A note in Armenian was left on his body taking responsibility for his assassination.

=== 1983 ===
- September 6, 1983 – Kamchiya Dam – 750 acres of forest were burned and propaganda leaflets were scattered.
  - Fall 1983 – Karnobat – a short circuit was intentionally created in the contact network at the train station, leading to a crash. On January 1, 1984, in a threatening letter to internal minister Dimitar Stoyanov, responsibility was taken for both the sabotage and the burning of agricultural land.

=== 1984 ===
- 1984 (Note: There is disagreement in sources as to the month in which this incident occurred, either May 22 or November 22) – Benkovski – a "pro-Turkish" group blew up the village church with 4.5 kilograms of TNT. The defendants were initially sentences to death, but were pardoned following the fall of Communism in Bulgaria.
- March 3, 1984 – Plovdiv – a suitcase with a device for derailing trains was abandoned at the "South" bus station by the railway station.
- April 1984 – a "pro-Turkish" group set fire to a number of forests and public buildings.
- April 6, 1984 – Gorna Oryahovitsa – an explosion at a post office resulted in the death of three individuals and left eleven injured. The bomber later confessed to a desire to blow up the local police chief.
- June 11, 1984 – Gabrovo–Varbanovo line – an explosion occurred on the railway, disrupting operation.
  - Subsequently, an individual demanded 120,000 leva from the Ministry of the Interior and threatened to blow up the Hristo Smirnenski dam if his demands were not met.
- August 30, 1984 – Varna Airport and Plovdiv Central railway station – on the eve of the anniversary of the 1944 Bulgarian coup d'état, two bomb attacks were carried out. An explosion in the parking lot of Varna Airport injured two women, and another in the waiting room of Plovdiv Central Station killed a woman and injured 42 other people.

=== 1985 ===
- 1985 – Burgas – an explosion occurred in a supermarket.
  - A member of the group that blew up the train for mothers with children near Bunovo was suspected as the perpetrator, but his guilt was not proven.
- 1985 – Razgrad – a group blew up power lines and destroyed agricultural machinery.
- March 9, 1985 – Bunovo, Sliven, and Varna – a carriage for mothers with children on the train between the cities of Burgas and Sofia was blown up. The attackers intended for the bomb to explode in the 3,200 meter-long Galabets tunnel, but the train was 2 minutes late, and the bomb exploded at the station. 7 people were killed, 9 people were seriously injured in the attack.
  - 30 minutes later, a bomb was detonated in the lobby of the "Sliven Hotel" – a centrally-located multi-story hotel in the city of Sliven. The explosive device was hidden in the pantry of the hotel's pastry shop, known as the "Test Tube". The walls of the pantry reduced the shock wave. 23 people were injured in the attack, and the ceiling of the hall was destroyed.
  - On the same day, an unsuccessful attempt at an attack on the beach of the "Druzhba" complex near Varna was uncovered.
- Summer 1985 – Karnobat – there was another attempt at sabotage by creating a short circuit in the contact network near the rain station.
- June 1985 – a bomb with a clockwork trigger mechanism was discovered and detonated near a sporting-ground.

=== 1986 ===
- July 31, 1986 – Varna – an explosive device was planted in the "Druzhba" resort (now called St. Konstantin). It contained about 3 kilograms of explosives placed in a 5-liter milk container, wrapped in paper, nylon and placed in a knitted net. It was accidentally discovered by beach lifeguards after a vacationer reported forgotten luggage. The explosive was taken to a safe place and defused by the Ministry of Interior.
- December 26, 1986 – Lyulyakovo – poisons were thrown into the shaft of a drinking water tank and leaflets with "pro-Turkish content" were scattered.

=== 1987 ===
- July 7, 1987 – Dobrich – two children were kidnapped in a blue Lada by three militants, who reportedly intended to use the children as human shields to facilitate their defection to Turkey. The militants were armed with twelve fragmentation grenades acquired from a military unit where one of them had served. They managed to detonate 3 of them in front of the International Hotel in the Golden Sands resort and wounded 3 people – 2 foreigners and a Bulgarian. The kidnappers later blew themselves up in the car in which the children were taken hostage. The children were injured, one seriously. Two militants were killed in the explosion, and the third was later sentenced to death and shot.
- August 1987 – Varna – explosives, a clockwork mechanism, and other necessities for a 3rd attack targeting the "Druzhba" resort were secured. The planned date of the attack was August 15, but the alleged would-be perpetrators were discovered and arrested 2 days earlier and the attack was prevented.

== Policy changes ==
As a result of the attacks, a "Terror" section within the sixth directorate of the Committee for State Security (DS) was created. Additionally, all watch shops in Bulgaria were made to record the identifying information of those who bought alarm blocks owing to the large number of explosive devices which had used timed clockwork mechanisms.

== Misrepresentation ==
Few of the 600 "terrorist" attacks which the Bulgarian government alleged had been committed in the country from 1984–1987 can be definitively explained, and no sufficiently large guerilla movement to which hundreds of attacks could be plausibly attributed emerged in Bulgaria during this period. Some authors attribute the Varna Airport (Note: The attacks occurred on the day that Zhivkov was to visit the areas.) and Plovdiv Central railway station, that the regime had blamed on Turks, to secret-police agents. Some Turks also worked for or collaborated with state security, willingly or under pressure, including prominent opposition figures such as Ahmed Dogan. Academic Tomasz Kamusella suggests that the government may have exaggerated the extent of armed opposition by Turkish groups for propagandist effect.

== Bibliography ==
- "30 години след първия атентат в БГ полицаи разказват историята от 1-во лице" [30 years after the first attack in Bulgaria, police officers tell the story in the first person]. Бележник.бг (in Bulgarian). March 22, 2018.
- "Declaration condemning the attempted forcible assimilation of Bulgarian Muslims" (in Bulgarian). Bulgarian National Assembly. January 11, 2012. Archived from the original on February 3, 2023.
- Büchsenschütz, Ulrich (2000). Малцинствената политика в България. Политиката на БКП към евреи, роми, помаци и турци (1944-1989) [Minority policy in Bulgaria. The policy of the BCP towards Jews, Roma, Pomaks and Turks (1944-1989).] (PDF) (in Bulgarian). International Center for Minority Studies and Intercultural Relations. ISBN 954-8872-24-2. Archived from the original (PDF) on September 26, 2007.
- "Passengers help disarm Turkish hijackers". The Christian Science Monitor. May 26, 1981.
- "За първи път: СНИМКИ от атентатите на протурски националисти във Варна" [For the first time: photos from the attacks of pro-Turkish nationalists in Varna]. Darik (in Bulgarian). November 27, 2022.
- Dimitrov, Vesselin (December 23, 2000). In Search of a Homogeneous Nation: The Assimilation of Bulgaria's Turkish Minority, 1984–1985 (PDF) (Report). European Centre for Minority Issues. Archived (PDF) from the original on February 23, 2026.
- Dimitrova, Alekseniya (July 21, 2012). "1982 г.: Бургас помни и убийството на турския консул Бора Сюелкан" [1982: Burgas remembers the killing of Turkish consul Bora Süelkan]. 24 Chasa (in Bulgarian).
- Georgieff, Anthony (August 19, 2012). "Terror Factor". Vagabond.
- Georgiev, Ivan (August 29, 2023). "Бивши агенти на ДС взривяват вагон с деца" [Former State Security agents blow up a carriage with children]. Telegraph (in Bulgarian).
- Georgiev, Ivan (March 12, 2024). "Зверски взривове бележат Възродителния процес!" [Savage explosions mark the Revival Process!]. Telegraph (in Bulgarian).
- Gruev, Mihail; Kalyonski, Aleksey (2008). Възродителният процес: Мюсюлманските общности и комунистическият режим: политики, реакции и последици [The Revival Process: The Muslim Communities and the Communist Regime: Policies, Reactions and Consequences] (in Bulgarian). Sofia: Ciela. ISBN 978-954-28-0291-4 – via Internet Archive.
- Hristov, Hristo (September 29, 2012). "За първи път: Досието на Ахмед Доган онлайн. Част 5.1: За преименуването в Кърджали и Хасково през 1984 г." [For the first time: Ahmed Dogan's file online. Part 5.1: On the renaming of Kardzhali and Haskovo in 1984.]. desebg.com (in Bulgarian). Archived from the original on May 20, 2013.
- Kalyonski, Aleksey (August 6, 2009). "„Възродителният процес" от 1984 – 1989 г. Част 1" [The "Revival Process" 1984–1989. Part 1]. Liberal Review (in Bulgarian). Archived from the original on February 28, 2026.
- Kamusella, Tomasz (2019). Ethnic Cleansing During the Cold War: The Forgotten 1989 Expulsion of Turks from Communist Bulgaria. London: Routledge. ISBN 978-1138480520.
- "Атентатите в България" [The attacks in Bulgaria]. Manager.bg (in Bulgarian). July 19, 2012.
- Minkova, Petya (March 18, 2021). "Любовна афера с дипломат разкрива терористите от гара Буново" [Love affair with a diplomat exposes the terrorists from Bunovo station]. 168 Chasa (in Bulgarian).
- Poulton, Hugh (1991). Balkans: Minorities and States in Conflict (PDF). London: Minority Rights Group. ISBN 1873194404. Archived from the original (PDF) on July 1, 2025.
- "Pro-Turkish Terrorist Acts in Bulgaria in the Mid-1980s" [Pro-Turkish Terrorist Acts in Bulgaria in the Mid-1980s]. socbg.com (in Bulgarian). January 28, 2014. Archived from the original on May 14, 2025.
- Tashev, Stefan (August 19, 2014). "Как „Мерзавците" взривиха България" [How "The Scoundrels" Blew Up Bulgaria]. Epicenter.bg (in Bulgarian).
- "Забравеният бомбен атентат на Централна гара в Пловдив, който уби жена и рани 42-ма" [The forgotten bomb attack at Plovdiv Central Station that killed a woman and injured 42]. TrafficNews (in Bulgarian). August 30, 2017.
- "The hijacking of a jetliner by four Turkish terrorists..." UPI. May 25, 1981.
- "Armenian terrorists ambushed and killed a Turkish consulate official". UPI. September 9, 1982.
- Vachkov, Daniel (2018). Аварии и катастрофи. Хроника на социалистическата индустриализация [Accidents and Catastrophes: A Chronicle of Socialist Industrialization] (PDF) (in Bulgarian). Sofia: Siela. ISBN 978-954-28-2486-2.
- Vasileva, Elka (July 19, 2012). "Атентатите в България от началото на 20 век до днес" [Attacks in Bulgaria from the beginning of the 20th century to the present day]. Dnes.bg (in Bulgarian).
