= 1989 expulsion of Turks from Bulgaria =

1989 ethnic cleansing of Turks from Bulgaria

- Part of the Revival Process
- Location: Bulgaria
- Date: May – August or December 1989 (Note: Expulsions formally came to an end on August 22, 1989, but the regime of Todor Zhivkov persisted until November 10 of that year. The subsequent government of Petar Mladenov reversed the heightened assimilation policies directed at Bulgarian Muslims on December 29 of that year.)
- Target: Bulgarian Muslims and Bulgarian Turks
- Attack type: Persecution, Ethnic cleansing, Forced displacement
- Victims: 310,000 (Note: 310,000 – 322,000 people were expelled from Bulgaria to Turkey between May 30 and August 22, 1989.) – 400,000 (Note: Including the family members of expellees who later joined them in exile, the total number of victims of the "Big Excursion" reaches 360,000 people, though some scholars estimate that this second number was really closer to 400,000 people. More Turks and Muslims continued to flee the country in the face of discrimination thereafter.)
- Perpetrators: People's Republic of Bulgaria, Bulgarian Communist Party

Over 300,000 Turks and Muslims were expelled by the government of the People's Republic of Bulgaria into Turkey in 1989.

== Terminology ==
Though modern use of the term ethnic cleansing dates back to the early 19th century, it is usually understood to have come into common usage with the breakup of Yugoslavia, which began in earnest in 1991, two years after the start of the "Big Excursion". The term ethnic cleansing is consequently not always associated with the 1989 forced migration in Bulgaria. In the years since Yugoslavia's dissolution, the term has gained scholarly acceptance despite its euphemistic origin. Instead, the event is usually referred to by the official (and likewise euphemistic) terms employed by the regime of Todor Zhivkov.

The Bulgarian government described the forced migrations as the "Big Excursion" (Note: Bulgarian: Голямата екскурзия, romanized: Golyamata Ekskurzia) because it officially claimed that the border with Turkey was allegedly opened "to allow tourists to visit the neighboring country", and the Zhivkov administration claimed that victims had only left temporarily to visit relatives abroad. Some have criticized the use of the official term. Polish academic Tomasz Kamusella describes continued use of the term Big Excursion as tantamount to acceptance of Zhivkov's propaganda, and some Turks and Bulgarian Muslims take offense to use of the term. Bulgarian economist Rumen Avramov refused to use the term entirely in The Economics of the Revival Process. Conversely, those who wish to belittle the memory of the forced migration of 1989 often do not capitalize the term Big Excursion.

== Background ==
=== Revival Process ===
In 1984, the People's Republic of Bulgaria, an authoritarian communist state, embarked on an assimilationist campaign known officially as the Revival Process. (Note: Bulgarian: Възродителен процес, romanized: Vazroditelen protses) The regime eventually resorted to ethnic cleansing. On June 7, 1989, General Secretary Todor Zhivkov said:

The riots in the country stopped after this exhibition. We are on the brink of a major exodus psychosis. How should we assess this psychosis? We need such psychosis, it is welcome. I'm going to tell you something that we keep secret. If we do not remove 200–300 thousand people from this population, after 15 years Bulgaria will not exist. It will be like Cyprus or something.

Ethnic issues in Cyprus were heightened at the time as part of the ongoing Cyprus Problem.

=== Bulgarian Muslims and Bulgarian Turks ===
Bulgarian Turks constitute a substantial portion of both Bulgaria's Muslim population and the victims of the Big Excursion. While Muslims of non-Turkish ethnicities (Pomaks, Muslim Roma, and Tatars, among others) were also affected by the Big Excursion, Pomaks were often referred to as "Turks" and vice versa. As a result, the precise identity of victims can be difficult to determine. Estimates of the ethnic composition of victims of the "Big Excursion" thus vary. For example, by one estimate, around 90% of victims were Bulgarian Turks, but by another, up to 111,000 (approximately one-third) of victims were Pomaks despite official exclusion of Pomaks from the Big Excursion. Since Pomaks and Turks traditionally lived in different parts of Bulgaria, authorities used individuals' place of origin to "impose a preferred ethnic category on a person."

=== Legal reforms ===
Passports were restricted in all Soviet bloc nations. Typically, passports were only issued to a select group and had to be relinquished to government authorities. To mitigate defection, passports were also usually not issued to entire families for travel to capitalist countries. On May 19, 1989, Bulgaria substantially loosened its passport regime and allowed Bulgarian citizens to keep their travel documents at home. During May 1989, Communist Bulgaria issued passports to all those it considered to be Turks. While changes to the passport regime were originally meant to come into force in September 1989, events developed quickly and the passport changes were utilized by Bulgarian Turks as early as June 1989.

== History ==
=== Start of the Excursion ===
Within days of the relevant legal reforms coming into effect, 170 of the most "problematic" dissidents were expelled, followed by another 4,000–10,000. 1,000 "ringleaders" of anti-regime protests were additionally removed to Austria, Yugoslavia, and Sweden. The state also threatened individuals. For instance, one Bulgarian Turk, Rasim Ozgur, stated that in early May 1989, communist state militiamen told him that they would kill him if he was seen conversing with "reported people", and they also told him that he "was about to emigrate". He thus prepared to leave Bulgaria and did so once the border with Turkey was opened later that month. Other targeted individuals who did not leave quickly enough were intimidated by agents of the state's secret service agency, the DS. Some DS officers directly commanded some Bulgarian Muslims to leave the country in fewer than two hours. The DS also ensured that expellees were allowed to take with them no more than 300 Bulgarian levs (around $40 in 1989 United States dollars) per person.

On May 29, 1989, General Secretary Todor Zhivkov announced the opening of the border with Turkey, ostensibly "to allow tourists to visit the neighboring country", for three months at most. Large numbers of Muslims, many of whom had already prepared to leave the country in the face of state intimidation, surged to the Turkish border. Turkey, in turn, issued 90-day visas on request to any holder of a Bulgarian passport. Turkey fully opened the Kapıkule border crossing near the Bulgarian town of Kapitan Andreevo on June 3, even to those without a visa. (Note: In some sources, the date that the border was opened is instead given as June 2.) All expellees had to cross into Turkey via this single border crossing. This checkpoint is sometimes referred to as "Checkpoint Ali".

In response to international backlash, particularly from Turkey with the support of the United States, the Bulgarian regime insisted that the victims of the Big Excursion had left voluntarily on tourist visas and thus could not be properly considered deportees. It further insisted that the flow of such people was the result of the relaxation of Bulgarian passport laws – the same laws that Turkey had desired for Bulgaria to relax – and that Bulgarian actions were simply in keeping with the Helsinki Accords.

=== Turkish Response ===
Turkey sought an agreement with Bulgaria regarding the migration of Bulgarian Turks from the start. Towards the beginning of the Big Excursion, Turkey vowed to accept the entire estimated population of Bulgarian Turks if necessary and suggested it would be able to integrate the expellees. However, Turkey soon struggled to handle the inflow of expellees from Bulgaria. The inflow caused rental price increases of up to 100% in European Turkey.

Turkey directly addressed Bulgarian rhetoric around the Cyprus problem, attempting to allay concerns that Turkey posed a threat to Bulgaria. Soon thereafter, however, a crowd of over 100,000, fueled by false rumors of Soviet military actions against Bulgarian Turks and Muslims, gathered in Istanbul's Taksim Square shouting anti-Bulgarian slogans. The Turkish ultranationalist organization known as the "Grey Wolves" openly called for an invasion of Bulgaria. These demonstrations and statements, which often warmongered, fueled the Bulgarian regime's anti-Turkish propaganda.

=== End of the Excursion ===
By late August, over 300,000 Muslims had crossed the Bulgarian-Turkish border, leading to a refugee crisis in Turkey. The Turkish and Bulgarian foreign ministers repeatedly planned to meet in Kuwait for talks regarding the crisis, but they failed to do so.

With no meeting set, on August 21, Turkey reinstated the visa requirement for Bulgarian passport holders, and a day later, Turkey officially closed its border with Bulgaria to stop the flow of "Bulgarian citizens without a Turkish visa". As a result, the number of Muslims crossing into Turkey dropped dramatically, though some Bulgarian expellees obtained Turkish visas thereafter and crossed the border. Some Bulgarian Muslims who had already packed to leave the country were unable to do so because of the closure. Around 25,000 were unable to cross into Turkey as a result of the closure.

Bulgaria did not attempt to more directly expel its Muslim population in large numbers following the closure, even after two weeks later (on September 3) Turkey reopened its border with Bulgaria for Turks and Muslims with a valid Turkish visa. On December 29, exactly seven months after Zhivkov announced the opening of the Turkish border and about one month after his resignation, the government of Petar Mladenov announced that the rights of Muslims would be restored. It took two years for that promise to be fully implemented.

Even after closing its shared border with Bulgaria, Turkey continued to reiterate its desire for a diplomatic agreement to address the refugee crisis caused by the Big Excursion. A diplomatic summit between Bulgaria and Turkey in Kuwait was held in October 1989, and a follow-up meeting was held months after the fall of Zhivkov in January 1990.

== Aftermath ==
Even before the end of the Excursion, large numbers of expellees returned to Bulgaria. For some, the decision to return to Bulgaria was motivated by hard living conditions in Turkish refugee camps and difficulties adjusting to life in Turkey. The number of returnees further increased after the end of the Big Excursion. By the end of 1990, around 150,000 had returned, and a year later, as many as 200,000 had returned.

In addition to the general economic malaise, the Big Excursion contributed to popular economic hardship. Bulgarian Turks were largely employed in the agricultural sector in Bulgaria, and the expulsions occurred at the same time as the annual harvest. As a consequence of the Excursion and the generally poor situation, Bulgaria experienced poor harvests leading to food rationing throughout the country, including in Sofia.

In Turkey, expellees found work in positions seen as "inferior".

== Legacy ==
As of 1989 the Big Excursion was the largest instance of ethnic cleansing in Europe by number of victims since the expulsion of Germans living east of the Oder–Neisse line between 1944 and 1950; though later there would be more victims during the Bosnian genocide and the expulsion (and subsequent return) of Kosovar Albanians in neighboring Yugoslavia.

Academic Tomasz Kamusella argues that in discourse, the Big Excursion is sometimes merged with the longstanding assimilationist policies of the Bulgarian state towards its Muslim minority or the Revival Process in particular. It is treated as an end point in this framing. However, in contrast to the preceding assimilation campaigns, the Big Excursion was unprecedented before 1989. Similarly, the Holocaust was of a distinct and unprecedented character from the series of pogroms and anti-semitic campaigns which preceded it, and is treated as such by historians.

The Big Excursion is less well-known than many of the other late-20th-century ethnic cleansings in the Balkans. Even after the fall of communism in Eastern Europe, media organizations largely did not report on the Big Excursion.

=== Bulgaria ===
Within Bulgaria, the events of 1989 are not particularly well known. Polish academic Tomasz Kamusella writes that "the generations of Bulgarians born after 1989 know next to nothing about the 1989 ethnic cleansing." Supporting the viewpoint of Bulgarian nationalists, post-Communist economic migration by Bulgarians of all ethnicities to Turkey became conflated with the Big Excursion in the eyes of many, bolstering the argument that the exodus had been voluntary.

=== Turkey ===
In Turkey, remembrance has been sustained within migrant communities and civil-society networks, especially through organizations founded by people who left Bulgaria. For the 30th anniversary of the 1989 migration, public ceremonies were held by migrant associations.

== See also ==
=== Groups ===
- Muhacir
- Bulgarian Turks in Turkey

=== Events ===
- Exodus of Turks from Bulgaria (1950–1951)

== Bibliography ==
- "Bulgaristan'dan Zorunlu Göçün 30'uncu Yılı Anma Programı" [Commemoration Program for the 30th Anniversary of the Forced Migration from Bulgaria] (in Turkish). Anadolu Ajansı. October 18, 2019.
- Angelov, Zhivko (August 6, 2008). "„Голямата екскурзия" и крахът на асимилацията" [The "Big Excursion" and the Collapse of Assimilation]. Dnevnik (in Bulgarian). Economedia. Archived from the original on September 1, 2008.
- Avramov, Rumen (2016). Икономика на Възродителния процес [The Economics of the Revival Process] (PDF) (in Bulgarian). Sofia: Centre for Advanced Study. ISBN 978-954-320-582-0. Archived from the original on April 11, 2026.
- "Bulgaristan'dan Zorunlu Göçün 30. Yılı" [30th Anniversary of the Forced Migration from Bulgaria]. Bursa İl Göç İdaresi Müdürlüğü (in Turkish). T.C. İçişleri Bakanlığı Göç İdaresi Genel Müdürlüğü. October 8, 2019.
- Coşgun, Bülent (January 2005). Social Networks and Urban Integration of Bulgarian Turkish Immigrants of 1989 and After: The Case of Yenibosna, Istanbul (PDF) (MS thesis). Middle East Technical University.
- Faktor.bg (May 29, 2016). "27 години от „Голямата екскурзия" – комунистическият план за етническо прочистване" [27 years since the "Great Excursion" - the communist plan for ethnic cleansing]. Faktor.bg (in Bulgarian).
- Ivanov, Dimitar (May 29, 2019). "Преди 30 г. Живков внушава: Ако не изведем 200-300 хиляди турци, след 15 години България ще бъде като Кипър" [30 years ago, Zhivkov suggested: If we do not subtract 200–300 thousand Turks, in 15 years Bulgaria will be like Cyprus]. Faktor.bg (in Bulgarian).
- Kalyonski, Aleksey (December 31, 2009). "1989 – Майските събития и „Голямата екскурзия"" [1989 – The May Events and the "Big Excursion"] (in Bulgarian). Liberal Review.
- Kamusella, Tomasz (2019). Ethnic Cleansing During the Cold War: The Forgotten 1989 Expulsion of Turks from Communist Bulgaria. Routledge Studies in Modern European History (1st ed.). Routledge. ISBN 978-0-367-58856-4.
- Kamusella, Tomasz (February 25, 2019). "Words Matter. Bulgaria and the 30th Anniversary of the Largest Ethnic Cleansing in Cold War Europe". New Eastern Europe.
- Kamusella, Tomasz (2020). "Between Politics and Objectivity: The Non-Remembrance of the 1989 Ethnic Cleansing of Turks in Communist Bulgaria". Journal of Genocide Research. 22 (4): 515–532. doi:10.1080/14623528.2020.1726649. hdl:10023/23778.
- Kutlay, Muzaffer (2017). "The Turks of Bulgaria: An Outlier Case of Forced Migration and Voluntary Return" (PDF). International Migration. 55 (5): 162–179. doi:10.1111/imig.12381.
- Martino, Francesco (November 4, 2009). "The Big Excursion of Bulgarian Turks". OBC Transeuropa (in Italian).
- Thum, Gregor (2010). "Review: Ethnic Cleansing in Eastern Europe after 1945". Contemporary European History. 19 (1): 75–81. doi:10.1017/S0960777309990257. S2CID 145605508.
- Vaksberg, Tatiana; Andreev, Alexander (December 24, 2014). "Assimilation by force". Deutsche Welle.
- Valkov, Ilya (January 18, 2019). "Изумителната забрава за етническото прочистване на българските турци" [The astonishing oblivion of the ethnic cleansing of the Bulgarian Turks]. Club "Z" (in Bulgarian).
