= Revival Process =

Assimilation policy in Bulgaria, 1984–1989

- People protesting for the return of their birth names
- Date: December 1984–December 1989
- Location: Bulgaria
- Type: Assimilation campaign
- Target: Bulgarian Turks (Note: Turkish identity in Bulgaria was complicated at the time. See § Bulgarian Turks for further clarification.)
- Perpetrators: People's Republic of Bulgaria; Bulgarian Communist Party (BCP)
- Outcome: Authorities forced about 850,000 people to change their names. (Note: See § Renaming for various estimates.); Some later reverted to their previous names.; Restrictions were rescinded in late 1989.
- Deaths: Various estimates (Note: See § Casualties for estimates.)
- Injuries: Several thousand (Note: See § Casualties.)
- Arrests: Several thousand (Note: See § Casualties.)

The Revival Process (Bulgarian: Възродителен процес, romanized: Vazroditelen protses) was a government-enforced assimilation campaign in the People's Republic of Bulgaria. It began on Gregorian Christmas 1984 and continued until December 1989. The state imposed new Bulgarian names on about 850,000 people, banned public use of the Turkish language, and restricted religious and cultural practices. The government declared the forced renaming complete on March 31, 1985, but restrictions on language, religion, and cultural practice remained until December 1989. In 1989, state pressure led more than 300,000 Bulgarian Turks to leave in a migration that began on May 29, 1989. (Note: See § 1989 expulsion.) After party leaders removed Todor Zhivkov on November 10, 1989, the new government under Petar Mladenov restored the right to hold Turkish names and eased religious and cultural restrictions on December 29.

Officials argued that Bulgarian Turks were descendants of Bulgarians who had been forcibly converted to Islam and Turkish culture, and presented the campaign as a restoration of Bulgarian origins. Authorities implemented the renaming campaign by surrounding Turkish villages with security forces and military vehicles, while employers carried out some name changes at official direction. Language, religious, and cultural restrictions were enforced through fines, surveillance, detention, and internal exile. Deaths occurred during state suppression of protests and opposition to the campaign and in prison camps such as the Belene labor camp, though death toll estimates vary among sources. (Note: See § Casualties for estimates.)

The campaign drew criticism from Turkish and Western officials and media outlets, human-rights organizations, and international bodies. After 1989, the Revival Process was condemned by Bulgarian political, religious, and civic institutions. Following the fall of communism in Bulgaria, legal mechanisms for name restoration were established and Bulgaria undertook minority-rights reforms. On January 11, 2012, the National Assembly of Bulgaria formally condemned the Revival Process.

== Terminology ==
=== The Revival Process ===
Scholars describe the term "Revival Process" as a euphemism, but economist Rumen Avramov writes that its use has become difficult to avoid. The term was first used at a Bulgarian Communist Party (BCP) Politburo meeting on January 18, 1985, by Georgi Atanasov. The term was not widely used at first, but became more common. The policy has been described as an assimilation campaign.

=== Bulgarian Turks ===
In communist Bulgaria, Muslim communities overlapped, and some Slavophone Muslims and Muslim Roma identified as Turks, with the latter sometimes doing so to avoid stigma. In Bulgaria, group identity often combined religion and ethnicity; Slavophone Muslims living mainly among Turks tended to emphasize their Bulgarianness, while those living mainly among Bulgarians more often emphasized their Turkishness. Officials used disputed ethnic categories, affecting people who did not fit official labels. Turks and Pomaks were sometimes confused with each other by the state – deliberately or otherwise.

== Forced assimilation ==
=== Background ===
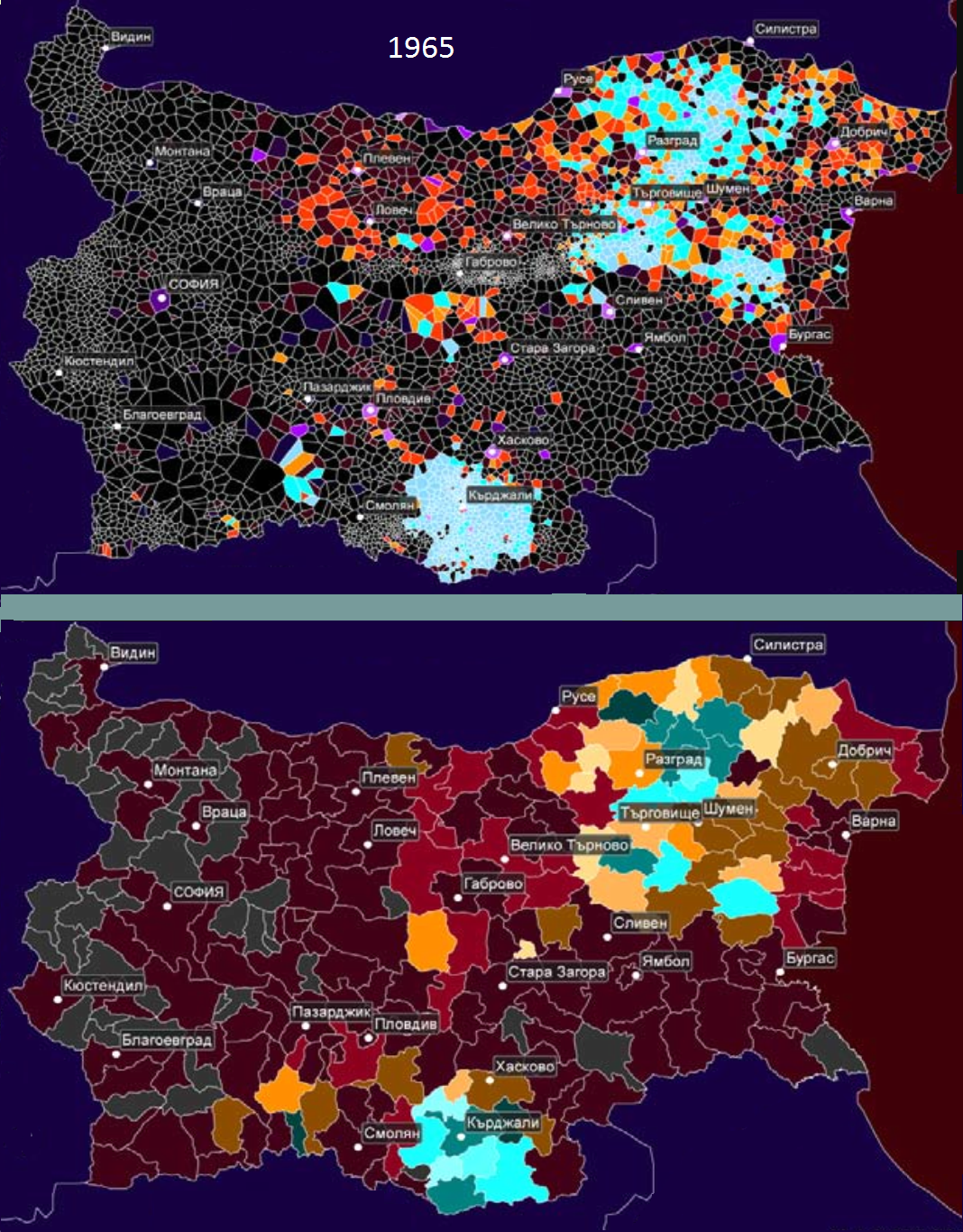
Distribution of ethnic Turks in Bulgaria according to the 1965 census Lighter shades indicate higher population density, while darker shades indicate lower population density.

Turkey's 1980 military coup led the nation to move away from some elements of Kemalism and undermined Turkey's "democratic credentials" internationally. Turkey launched a military intervention in Cyprus in 1974, and the Turkish Republic of Northern Cyprus was proclaimed in 1983. The BCP leadership treated these developments as security concerns, though sources do not find evidence that the Bulgarian government expected a near-term invasion of Bulgaria. Before the Revival Process, Turkey also faced Kurdish unrest and foreign-policy disputes with Greece, Iran, and the European Economic Community. Turkey also restricted some minority groups and naming practices. In 1981, Yugoslavia experienced unrest among its Muslim-majority Albanian minority. Avramov writes that the final pre-campaign discussion of the "Turkish Problem" focused on security. The Turkish minority also had a higher birth-rate than Slavic Bulgarians. Laber reported contemporary projections suggesting that, if then-current trends continued, Turks could outnumber Slavs in the 21st century.

By late 1984, communist Bulgaria belonged to organizations and treaties that protected minority rights, while continuing to implement assimilation policies in breach of those obligations. The government was concerned about potential backlash from Turkey and Western nations, and it sometimes avoided extending previous measures to Turks. According to the 1975 census, Turks made up about 8.4 percent of Bulgaria's population. Turks lived mainly in northeastern and southern Bulgaria, notably Kardzhali Province.

Scholars date Islam's introduction to Bulgaria to the 14th century, after the Ottoman conquest. Two theories explain the emergence of Turks in Bulgaria. One theory traces the Turkish community to migration from Asia Minor, while the second rejects such migration. The Bulgarian communist government said any members of the Turkish minority who felt connected with Turkey emigrated to Turkey under a limited migration treaty between Bulgaria and Turkey in effect from 1969 to 1979. It also said those who remained were Bulgarians Turkified in language and religion. Bulgarian officials also cited physical-anthropological claims, including phrenological arguments, to assert that the studied Bulgarian Turks were morphologically Bulgarian. The BCP framed the policy as part of building "real" communism and a classless society, both internally and in discussions with Soviet Union (USSR) officials.

Soviet stances on Bulgarian minority policy also influenced Bulgaria. Academic Vesselin Dimitrov linked the timing of the Revival Process to changes in the Soviet Union in the early 1980s that reduced external constraints on Bulgarian domestic policy. The renaming campaign coincided with a renewed phase of the Cold War, weakened Soviet leadership, and Konstantin Chernenko's extended illness. Avramov further refers to the USSR's invasion of Afghanistan in 1979 and changes in power in the USSR from 1982 to 1985. Bulgaria's consistently pro-Soviet foreign policy gave the Zhivkov government more room to pursue assimilation measures than other Soviet satellite countries had. Academic Bojkov writes that Mikhail Gorbachev also gave tacit approval to Bulgarian minority policies. Despite this, Bulgarian leaders denied Moscow's direct involvement in the Revival Process.

Academic İbrahim Karahasan-Çınar identifies several theorists of the campaign besides Zhivkov:

- Milko Balev - Central Committee secretary
- Georgi Atanasov - Central Committee secretary
- Pencho Kubadinski - Central Committee secretary
- Stoyan Mihaylov - Central Committee secretary
- Aleksandar Lilov (Note: Lilov was removed from power in September 1983. He later returned and delivered the Mladenov government's official denunciation of the Revival Process in December 1989.) - Central Committee secretary
- Dimitar Stoyanov (internal affairs minister) - Internal Affairs minister
- Petar Mladenov - Foreign minister
- Georgi Tanev - Kardzhali District Committee (Bulgarian: Окръжен комитет, romanized: Okrazhen Komitet) first secretary

Georgi Tanev said Bulgarian Turks had a strong group identity expressed through "language, tradition and customs", and that their social environment separated Turks from the body of the Bulgarian nation. He submitted proposals to the BCP Politburo on how to address this situation, provided justification of grassroots support for renaming, and later rose through the communist state hierarchy. Tanev later became internal affairs minister and received the Hero of the People's Republic of Bulgaria award, though his receipt of the award was not publicized.

Karahasan-Çınar does not list Lyudmila Zhivkova, the daughter of Todor Zhivkov. She had been a member of the BCP's Central Committee from the mid-1970s until her death. (Note: Sources differ on the exact date that Zhivkova held certain positions from.) Zhivkova championed Bulgarian culture and policies aimed at cultural revival. Although she promoted a cultural revival that emphasized foreign ties, some figures around her favored a narrower understanding of Bulgarian culture. After Zhivkova's death, many of her ideas and projects faded and her close associates were disfavored by the BCP. Dimitrov writes that this helped non-inclusive ideas of cultural revival become dominant.

Shortly before the Revival Process, the Bulgarian government introduced a new, unified identity system under the Unified System for Civil Registration and Administrative Services for the Population within the Ministry of Regional Development and Public Works of Bulgaria. The government tied the unified system to the planned mass issue of new documents by 1985. State identification cards were required for access to banks, healthcare, and wages. Those without identification cards bearing Bulgarian names were eventually prohibited from registering births or marriages as well.

Shortly before the renaming began, Internal Affairs Minister Dimitar Stoyanov stated the Bulgarian government's intentions:

The winter months must be used and the work must be basically completed within the specified time frame... I will mention a number that should remain between us. We are talking about several tens of thousands of people who we need to separate from the Bulgarian Turks, i.e. to reduce the so-called population of Bulgarian Turks in Bulgaria by 10-12 percent.

=== Initial campaigns ===
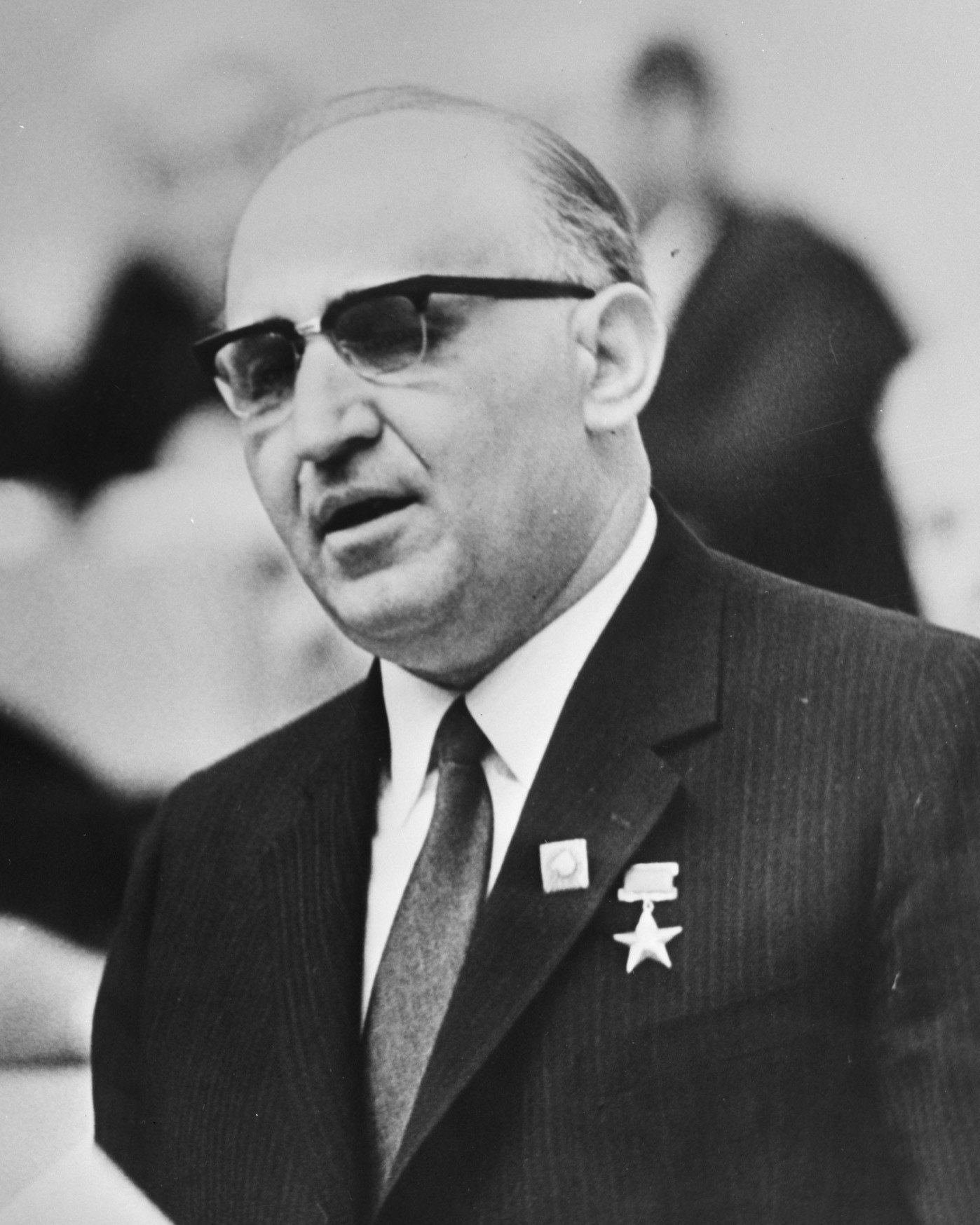
Todor Zhivkov, leader of the People's Republic of Bulgaria during the period when the campaign was implemented.

From 1950 to 1951, the communist government expelled around 150,000 ethnic Turks from the country. From 1962, the government barred Slavophone Muslims from attending Turkish-language schools, and in 1972, it banned Turkish-language schools. The government forced many Muslims to change their names; by 1974, around 150,000 Slavophone Muslims and 200,000 Turks had been forced to adopt new names.

In 1971, the government adopted a new constitution that supported assimilation policies and weakened minority protections, though it still guaranteed rights relevant to the Revival Process. Officials replaced the term "national minorities" with "citizens of non-Bulgarian origin", and their discourse framed minority identities as compatible with eventual assimilation.

In 1978, the government tried to replace traditional and religious observances with approved socialist ones. It sent officials to Islamic funerals to ensure participants carried out approved socialist rites and prayed in the Bulgarian language. The prescribed rituals combined Bulgarian Christian elements with Marxist-Leninist atheism.

In the period leading up to the Revival Process, the state intensified its assimilationist education policies by promoting mixed marriages and subjected Turkish-minority teachers to ideological training. Between 1981 and 1983, authorities forced around 100,000 people, mainly Muslim Roma, to change their names. It then extended the measure to Crimean Tatars and Alians, a Bulgaria-based Shia group, shortly before the Revival Process began in 1984. The government also resolved to issue around 250,000 identity papers bearing new Bulgarian names to Muslim Roma. Before it was implemented, many people already felt the government was moving toward a campaign like the Revival Process.

=== Start of the Revival Process ===
The BCP resolved on June 19, 1984, to carry out a "unification" campaign, and informed leaders of regions with substantial Muslim populations that autumn. Orders to begin preparations for the implementation of the Revival Process were issued on December 10, 1984. The Revival Process began on Gregorian Christmas 1984. (Note: Sources differ as to whether the campaign began on the 24th or the 25th.) A Central Committee plenum in mid-February 1985 (Note: Some sources give the date of the plenum as February 13–14, while others give February 18.) endorsed the campaign after Zhivkov had already extended it nationwide.

==== Approved name lists ====
After disputes over which names should count as Bulgarian, officials compiled a list of approved names. The list included many Christian names, including names linked to Eastern Orthodox saints and the church calendar, though it also included "neutral" names. This list was originally meant for people in mixed marriages, but it later expanded in scope. Officials did not complete the "Classifier of Bulgarian Names" before the start of the Revival Process, but the state provided indices from which people were required to choose their new names. Officials accepted some names of foreign origin, including Turkish, Armenian, and Arabic names, if they could be written in Bulgarian. In addition, some Bulgarian family names were of Turkish origin, which presented a dilemma to the state. The same body also sought to create an acceptable foreign-name classifier.

==== Renaming ====
By late 1984, Bulgarian authorities had already renamed many non-Turkish Muslims, and then extended the policy to Turks. Officials summoned individuals in their villages and required them to replace their Turkish names with Bulgarian ones chosen from approved lists. Officials enforced the name changes through intimidation, which was often backed by security forces and military vehicles. Employers also renamed Turks at the direction of officials. The government required municipalities to enforce the use of the new names in public and private life. Some Turks who accepted name changes were later labeled as "collaborators" by other Turks. The government described the renaming as voluntary, although human rights groups and later scholarship described it as coerced.

At first, authorities required only Turks living in or from the Rhodopes to change their names. Around 310,000 people in Haskovo and Kardzhali provinces had been renamed by January 18, 1985. After receiving reports on the initial renaming actions, the BCP's Politburo ordered the expansion of the campaign. Authorities implemented the order in February 1985, and on March 31 that year, the Bulgarian government declared the process completed and issued new identity documents to those affected. The government seized the old identity documents and planned a census that year using the new documents. Authorities conducted the census from December 4 to 12 and gradually released the results until the end of 1987. They did not publish the final census results until 1988. "Turks" and "Muslims" disappeared as categories in this census. Despite the census data, sources differ on the number of people renamed:

Number renamed	Time frame / scope	Notes
800,000	Christmas 1984–January or February 1985	—
822,588	Revival Process up to June 1985	—
850,000	Late 1984–Early 1985	—
850,000–1,100,000	Revival Process	—
Nearly 1 million	December 1984–January 1985	—
1,306,000	1984–1985	According to the source, this estimate might combine totals for Turks, Gypsies, and Pomaks, including name changes from mixed marriages.

==== Other policies ====
The Bulgarian government banned the use of the Turkish and Romani languages in public, although up to 70 percent of the Turkish minority could not speak Bulgarian. The government extended the prohibition to Turkic Christian communities and banned public use of their language. Signs warning it was "forbidden to speak" either "French" (Note: The authorities sought not to refer to the Turkish language directly.) or "in a foreign language" were posted in public spaces in the majority Turkish areas. Authorities fined people who spoke Turkish in public five leva or more, and sometimes imprisoned or exiled them. One Turk was imprisoned for five years for persistently using Turkish, and another was exiled from Bulgaria for two years.

The government had already banned visible markers of Muslim identity, such as religious clothing, so people used substitutes. For example, dark raincoats became substitutes for veils. During the Revival Process, officials barred Islamic burials and traditional headstone shapes. Washing the dead before burial was also outlawed. The state further pressured Muslims to deface Islamic symbols and Arabic inscriptions on graves. At times, Turkish families buried their deceased under headstones with only a photograph because religious symbols were prohibited and they did not wish to use the assigned "Bulgarian" name. Local authorities ordered the defacement of the Turkish names of 2,000 individuals on gravestones near Pavel. The graves of prominent Turkish-language writers in Bulgaria were destroyed in 1985. Similarly, authorities occasionally had crescents that adorned minarets removed because the symbol is associated with Turkish symbols.

Authorities also barred stores and restaurants from serving women in traditional Islamic dress. In some areas, the wearing of fez hats and traditional Turkish pants were banned. Authorities also destroyed Turkish-language books and other Turkish cultural items. Officials inspected the mail of Bulgarian Turks, and sometimes demanded the translation of mail written in Turkish for inspection. Turkish-language music was also banned. Authorities additionally sought to promote traditional Slavic gatherings of young people (Bulgarian: седянки, romanized: sedyanki) among the policy's targets. With respect to Roma specifically, semi-nomadic Mahala settlements were hidden behind concrete walls.

Authorities strictly enforced the ban on circumcision and required Muslim parents to sign documents promising not to circumcise their child. Officials inspected boys for compliance; parents and those who performed the circumcision faced punishment for violations. In 1987, Amnesty International reported the state imprisoned four women for between six and eight months because they circumcised their sons or grandsons. The maximum allowed punishment for violators was a fine of up to 1,000 leva or three years' imprisonment.

Communist Bulgaria appointed a chief mufti and regional muftis during the Revival Process. The government chose these religious officials for their loyalty rather than for their religious training. The state-appointed chief mufti said authorities did not prevent Muslims from performing rites and declared support for the renaming policy. The national religious body for Muslims in Bulgaria at the time was known as the Supreme Spiritual Council of the Muslim Faith.

==== State media and propaganda ====
The Bulgarian government controlled most of the country's media outlets, and many journalists came from politically acceptable backgrounds or were members of the ruling party. In January 1985, Todor Zhivkov told the Communist Party's Central Committee the party should remain silent in the press and not issue information to particular groups to avoid speculation. In subsequent years, the media echoed official narratives of the essential Bulgarian origin of the Turkish minority. The press published the involuntary declarations of thousands of Turks affirming a Bulgarian identity, and it insisted that Bulgarian Turks, who were referred to as "New Bulgarians", approved of the renaming program. Opinion polling indicated indifference among the general public toward the nation's Turkish minority. According to Dimitrov, opposition to the campaign among ethnic Bulgarians was limited since the Turkish minority was heavily concentrated in two regions of the country. The government largely refrained from mobilizing ethnic Bulgarians in support of the Revival Process.

=== Reaction and resistance ===
Many targets of the policy continued to perform circumcision and speak Turkish at home. However, public resistance was often limited and uncoordinated. Some individuals tried to avoid the renaming campaign by hiding in remote areas, but submitted after a few days. Those who attempted to escape the renaming were punished by being assigned names most closely associated with the Christian religion.

==== Turkish National Liberation Movement ====
One group was the "Turkish National Liberation Movement in Bulgaria", founded in Varna on December 8, 1985. Among the organization's early members were Ahmed Dogan (Note: Also referred to at this time as Medi Doganov.) and future co-founder and later chairman of the Movement for Rights and Freedoms (MRF) Kasim Dal. (Note: Also referred to at this time as Diman Sabinov Kisimov.) Ahmed Dogan played a leading role as the organization's political theorist; he said the organization never sought secession or to undermine state sovereignty. The movement also sought official recognition of Bulgaria's Turkish minority.

Dogan's role in the organization later became controversial; sources agree he was connected to the Committee for State Security (DS), the Bulgarian equivalent of the Soviet Committee for State Security, but they differ on whether he was among its founders or later assumed leadership. Some scholars also say the DS played an active role in the Turkish National Liberation Movement in Bulgaria's creation and development. In 1992, former senior intelligence officer Radoslav Raykov stated Dogan was infiltrated into the organization and convicted along with other leaders to build a legend for him. According to Alexei Kalyonski, the term "Liberation Movement" suggests a connection to the DS.

Most of the organization's membership was arrested by mid-1986. Around 200 of its members were arrested and 18 stood trial. Ahmed Dogan received a ten-year sentence.

==== Armed resistance ====
While acts of political violence and sabotage were committed in Bulgaria during the Revival Process, observers have described resistance by Bulgarian Turks as mostly peaceful rather than as organized armed resistance. Rumen Avramov, who was an economic advisor to Bulgaria's first non-communist president Zhelyu Zhelev, said the scale of state repression prevented the development of organized armed opposition. The Bulgarian government undertook rearmament aimed at strengthening its internal security forces.

Unorganized armed resistance occurred throughout the Revival Process. Authorities reported more than 600 incidents they described as "terrorism", and attributed these to Turks and opposition groups, though the attribution and details of many cases are disputed. For example, on March 9, 1985, an attack killed seven people in Bunovo when a train carriage reserved for mothers on a route between Burgas and Sofia was blown up. (Note: Some sources instead give the number of victims as six.) A court sentenced the attack's perpetrators to death and the executions were carried out in late 1988. The government used such attacks to justify tightened security measures.

==== Belene labor camp ====
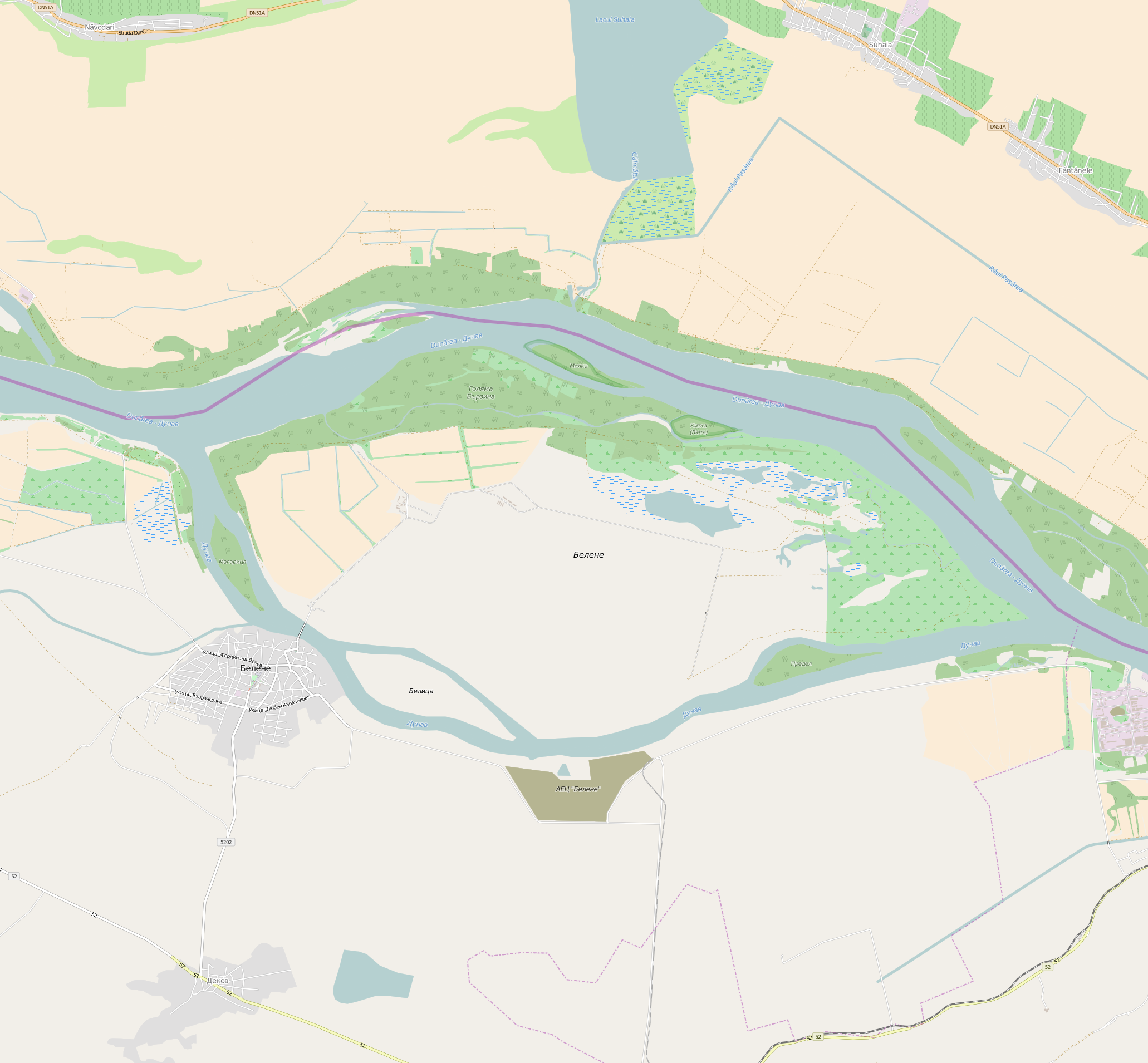
Belene Island in the Danube River, where the authorities reactivated the Belene labor camp during the Revival Process

During the Revival Process, the Bulgarian authorities reactivated the Belene labor camp, situated on an island in the Danube River, to detain people whom they arrested for resisting the campaign. The BCP used Belene as a labor camp until 1959, when it was converted into a prison. Authorities typically held Turks who resisted in Belene for two-to-three months, though they held some for much longer. In 1985, authorities incarcerated more than 500 Turks there for resistance to the renaming measures. Authorities often held detainees without judicial sentences at Belene. In April 1986, prisoners in Belene began a hunger strike that lasted around 30 days. In May 1986, authorities released most of the prisoners and then exiled them to different regions of Bulgaria. Authorities released the remaining detainees in early 1987 in districts populated by ethnic Bulgarians.

==== Casualties ====
On December 26, 1984, in Mogilyane, security forces opened fire on demonstrators during protests against the forced replacement of Turkish names with Bulgarian ones, killing three people, including the young child Türkan Feyzullah. Security forces shot Türkan while her mother carried the child on her back. Mogilyane residents later erected a monument in her memory.

Some Bulgarian Turks were killed, injured, or detained at protests, like the one in Mogilyane in 1984, in opposition to official policies. Others died in prison camps associated with the Revival Process, such as Belene. Estimates of the number of people killed, injured, and arrested during the Revival Process varied:

Number killed	Number injured	Number arrested	Time frame / scope (Note: These estimates exclude events such as the 1989 unrest and expulsion.)	Notes
800–2,500	—	—	November 1984–February 1985	This estimate covers those killed, injured, or arrested in opposition to the initial wave of name changes owing to the use of the military to facilitate the campaign.
1,000+	—	—	November 1984–February 1985	This estimate covers those killed, injured, or arrested in opposition to the initial wave of name changes. The source notes that the 1,000+ estimate may be higher if deaths from neglect or suicide in Belene are included as death certificates in Belene were regularly falsified.
300–1,500	Several thousand	Several thousand	Late 1984–early 1985	This estimate covers those killed, injured, or arrested in opposition to the initial wave of name changes.
300–1,000	Several thousand	Several thousand	Late 1984–early 1985	This estimate covers those killed, injured, or arrested in opposition to the initial wave of name changes.

==== International reaction ====
Turkish president Kenan Evren discussed minority and emigration issues with Todor Zhivkov in 1982; Bulgarian officials interpreted the talks as closing the emigration question and treating ethnic policy as an internal matter. Zhivkov denied the claims, as Bulgarian authorities did at first. Following the start of the Revival Process, Turkish diplomatic responses were restrained. Evren first formally protested the Revival Process in January 1985, sending Zhivkov a message asking that the forced assignment of Bulgarian names be stopped. Despite official restraint, some Turkish and Western media described the Revival Process with terms such as "genocide" and "state crime" or used specific sensational headlines.

Bulgarian Turkish children left behind after their parents fled to Turkey drew particular concern from the Turkish public. The street outside the Bulgarian embassy in Ankara was temporarily renamed after one of these children. In 1987, Turkish state television aired a dramatization titled To Be Reborn (Turkish: Yeniden Doğmak) about families separated by events in Bulgaria, prompting a sharp response from the Bulgarian government. Often, Bulgaria responded to these denunciations with comparisons to the Kurdish issue in Turkey. In line with the Helsinki Accords, the Bulgarian government reduced efforts to obstruct the reception of critical Western and Turkish broadcasts to Bulgaria, though jamming of Turkish-language broadcasts in particular did not cease completely. During the media dispute, Bulgaria promoted the film Time of Violence, a nearly five-hour historical epic about forced conversions to Islam under Ottoman rule. Subsequent diplomatic negotiations between Bulgaria and Turkey concerned the broadcast of Time of Violence and the Turkish film Belene, which documented the Belene labor camp.

Turkey also raised the Revival Process before several international bodies. The Conference on Security and Co-operation in Europe (CSCE), predecessor to the Organization for Security and Co-operation in Europe, tabled the issue in both its May 7–June 17, 1985 and October 15–November 25 meetings. The United Nations Educational, Scientific and Cultural Organization did the same at its October 8–November 12, 1985, meeting. The Council of Europe (CoE) adopted Resolution 846, calling on Bulgaria to end violations of the social, cultural, and religious rights of the affected minorities.

In 1987, the Islamic Conference, a predecessor to the Organization of Islamic Cooperation, sent a delegation to Bulgaria. Following this visit, the organization published a report that was critical of Bulgaria. Other international organizations echoed this condemnation, including the United Nations, whose Commission on Human Rights Special Rapporteur on Religious Intolerance listed Bulgaria among countries preventing the peaceful practice of religion.

Bulgarian authorities publicized supportive visits by Muslim clerics, including the chief muftis of eastern-aligned Syria and communist South Yemen in 1986 and the chief mufti of Ghana the next year. The Soviet Union considered the treatment of Bulgaria's Turkish minority an internal Bulgarian issue, and the Soviet press remained silent on the subject. Only Greece supported Bulgaria among the nations of the European Community, despite Greek membership in the North Atlantic Treaty Organization (NATO) alongside Turkey.

==== Second wave of resistance ====
In the late 1980s, ranking members of the Bulgarian government expressed internal concern about the shortcomings of the Revival Process and the ineffectiveness of the assimilation policies. The government undertook limited resettlement of Turks to western and northwestern Bulgaria, and the placement of Turkish children in assimilatory boarding schools. Minister Pencho Kubadinski suggested people from the Soviet Union should be settled in place of resettled Turks.

A second wave of organized popular resistance emerged and shaped open civil opposition to the communist government. Most of the groups openly declaring opposition to the Revival Process, such as the Independent Society for the Protection of Human Rights, the independent trade union Podkrepa, the Club for Support of Glasnost and Perestroika, and Ecoglasnost formed in the context of Perestroika. On November 13, 1988, the Democratic League for the Protection of Human Rights in Bulgaria was established with Mustafa Yumer as chairman and grew to include several thousand members. In April 1989, the Support Society–Vienna 89 was founded in the town of Djebel.

These associations were at the heart of the "May Events" (Bulgarian: Майските събития, romanized: Maiiskite subitiya) from May 19–27, 1989. Demonstrators, estimated at 30,000–53,000, carried out hunger strikes and mass protests, and at times clashed with police. They aimed to attract the attention of the world community, especially the CSCE symposium "Freedom of the Spirit and the Human Dimension in Europe", which was held from May 30–June 23, 1989 (Note: This conference was held after the forced expulsion began, an eventuality unknown to protesters at the time.) in Paris, France. From May 19–27, 1989, between 25,000 and 30,000 demonstrators took to the streets in northeastern Bulgaria. Some demonstrations involved violence.

Bulgaria became isolated from its Eastern bloc allies during the Revolutions of 1989. Diplomatic pressure on Bulgaria from Turkey also increased; Turkey raised the issue in a number of international forums. The president of France, François Mitterrand, visited Bulgaria in January 1989 and held meetings with dissidents at the French embassy in Sofia.

The Bulgarian government responded to the protests by sending soldiers, fire brigades, and the national police (then styled as the people's militias) against the demonstrators. Soldiers were loaded into trucks covered with opaque tarps, without prior information about their assigned task. Riot-control methods, including tear gas and occasionally firearms, were used. Sources differ on the number of protesters killed; Alexei Kalyonski estimated between seven and ten protesters were killed, and that hundreds were injured. Tomasz Kamusella estimated that 30–102 protesters were killed and hundreds were injured. Bulgarian authorities reported seven deaths. Opposition leaders were subsequently removed from Bulgaria; Mustafa Yumer, for example, was expelled to Turkey.

== 1989 expulsion ==
The Bulgarian government concluded that part of the Muslim population could not be assimilated and shifted toward promoting emigration. At the end of May 1989, after prominent dissidents were removed, authorities enabled mass departures by loosening travel restrictions, intimidating individuals, and later opening the border with Turkey. Authorities framed the departures as temporary tourist travel, and propaganda referred to the episode as the "Big Excursion".

From May 29 to August 1989, over 300,000 people left Bulgaria for Turkey under state pressure. In August 1989, Turkey temporarily closed the border with Bulgaria, ending the forced migration.

=== Economic effects ===
In the 1980s, Bulgaria entered economic decline, and its government undertook reforms in response. As early as 1987, Bulgarian state media discussed a possible near-term financial insolvency of the country. The events of 1989 intensified the crisis. Avramov writes that these events revealed economic costs associated with the Revival Process.

== Aftermath ==
On November 10, 1989, party leaders forced Todor Zhivkov to resign. The new Bulgarian government restored the right of Bulgarian citizens to have Turkish names on December 29 that year. The new government condemned the Revival Process as a "deviation from 'Leninist' norms". By 1991, Bulgaria had allowed religious instruction and Turkish-language instruction to resume, and adopted a new national constitution guaranteeing freedom of religion.

=== Restoration of original names ===
Although the legal right to use Turkish names was restored, those affected still faced obstacles when restoring their previous names. In March 1990, Bulgaria adopted legislation enabling that restoration, but its early implementation was burdensome, requiring a court procedure and two supporting witnesses. The law required people who restored their names to keep Bulgarian suffixes, such as "-ov" and "-ova". A 1990 Helsinki Watch report said fewer than one-third of Turks had restored their names nationwide. For example, academic Yelis Erolova restored her Turkish name only after 1990. In some areas, older Bulgarian Turks more commonly restored their names than younger people. On November 16, 1990, the government adopted a reform that replaced the court procedure with an administrative process.

=== Strengthening of Turkish identity ===
The Revival Process strengthened Turkish self-identification among the targeted minority, with many placing greater emphasis on Turkish identity than on Bulgarian identity. This was tied to Islamic religious traditions that marked differences between Turks and ethnic Bulgarians, and was associated with increased contact with people and groups from Muslim-majority countries. People described themselves as "Turks of Bulgaria" rather than "Bulgarian Turks". Gruev and Kalyonski said these changes also strengthened distinctions between Turkish and Bulgarian identities. According to Yelis Erolova, her family made her think of Turkey as her "mother nation".

=== Nationalist backlash ===
Post-communist reforms also produced nationalist opposition, especially over the restoration of Turkish names and the teaching of Turkish in schools. In Razgrad, nationalist protesters proclaimed a "Bulgarian Republic of Razgrad", and it later came to encompass a number of municipalities and became known as the "Association of Free Bulgarian Cities". The Razgrad municipal authorities also decided not to teach Turkish in local schools after nationalist pressure. On October 25, 1990, the MRF club in Shumen was bombed. All of this engendered a response among the Turkish population, including a boycott of schools in southeastern Bulgaria by ethnic-Turks.

Nationalist protest also accompanied parliamentary debate over the restoration of Turkish names; around 200 people demonstrated outside the National Assembly during discussion of related measures. Post-communist prime minister Andrey Lukanov expressed concern that Turkish-language education might be extended "unconstitutionally" to Pomaks. His successor, Dimitar Iliev Popov, similarly warned against what he called "Muslim aggression".

=== Impact on the Cold War ===
The alliances of the Cold War in 1989 The Eastern Bloc, including Bulgaria, is depicted in red, while the Western Bloc, including Turkey, is in blue.

Prior to the start of the Revival Process, relations between the People's Republic of Bulgaria and Turkey were good. Todor Zhivkov had visited Turkey in 1983. Although the Revival Process was addressed in Cold War diplomatic exchanges, bilateral contacts initially continued through diplomatic channels. The campaign strained relations and drew condemnation from NATO and other international actors. The Turkish ambassador to Bulgaria, Ömer Engin Lütem, described the most difficult phase of relations during this period as a "war of notes". Because relevant Russian and U.S. records remain inaccessible and scholarship is limited, the campaign's late-Cold-War effects remain unclear, but academic Tomasz Kamusuella suggests these facts point to some sort of secret negotiation between NATO and the Warsaw Pact to prevent the justification of war.

Relations deteriorated further in 1989. In August of that year, the United States recalled its ambassador to Bulgaria. The issue was also raised in the United States Congress. International actors organized fact-finding activity concerning human rights conditions in Bulgaria. The Soviet Union refused to mediate between Bulgaria and Turkey when official tensions grew, although it engaged in shuttle diplomacy through its diplomatic mission in Ankara. According to Dimitrov, the failure of these efforts convinced the Soviet leadership that Zhivkov had "outlived his usefulness" and led it to support an anti-Zhivkov faction within the Bulgarian government led by foreign minister Petar Mladenov.

=== Legal aftermath ===
In 1990, Bulgaria implemented an amnesty for those convicted of political crimes. Authorities released 31 of 81 Turks imprisoned for resistance, but kept 50 convicted under the criminal code in prison. Similar legal distinctions between "political" and "criminal" offenses existed in other states where dissidents faced criminal charges.

On January 18, 1990, authorities issued a warrant for Zhivkov's arrest, and he was held under house arrest. (Note: Sources disagree on whether Zhivkov was immediately placed under house arrest or subsequently moved to it.) While formally under house arrest, he was reportedly allowed to travel around Bulgaria. Prosecutors charged a number of defendants for abuses associated with the Belene camp, and Zhivkov faced additional charges unrelated to the Revival Process. Some perpetrators of the Revival Process were never charged. Although legal proceedings began in 1991, they were still ongoing when Zhivkov died in 1998. In 2022, prosecutors dropped the remaining charges after the final defendant, Georgi Atanasov, died. The case was initially terminated after Atanasov's death, but after protests from families of Belene camp victims, the Sofia Court of Appeal ordered the Military Prosecutor's Office to continue the investigation. The court ruled that the procedural rights of people affected by the Revival Process were not respected and that the case could not be terminated without a declaration from the Prosecutor's Office as to what crime it alleged that the defendants had committed.

== Legacy ==
=== Domestic ===
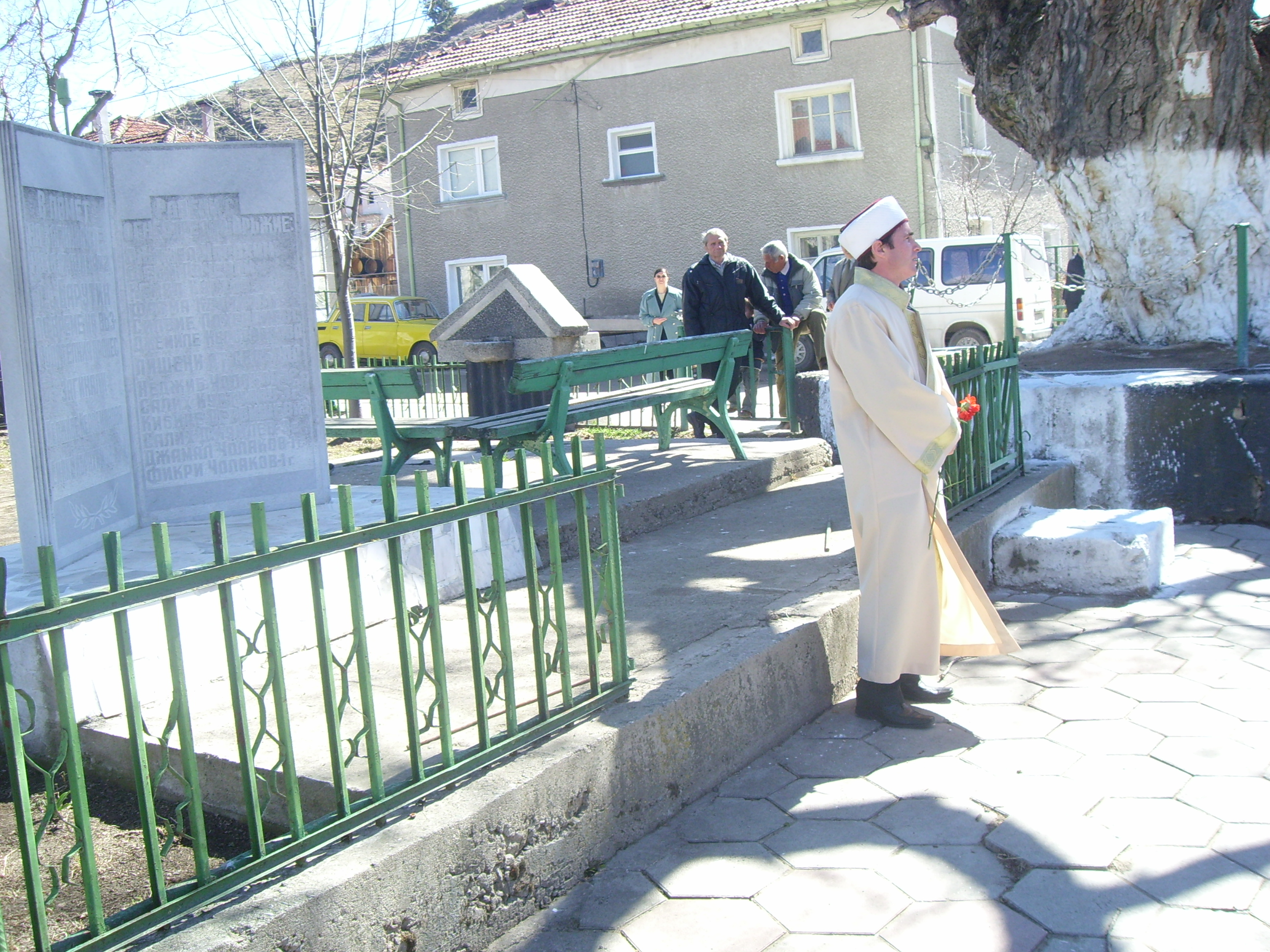
Memorial to victims of the Revival Process, Barutin, Bulgaria

Kutlay writes that the reversal of the Revival Process, together with moderation by both the new government and the Bulgarian Turkish community, contributed to Bulgaria's democratic transition. Bulgaria's first democratically elected president, Zhelyu Zhelev, treated the Turkish political movement as a political ally and defended the nascent Movement for Rights and Freedoms (MRF) against a legal challenge from nationalists and the post-communist Bulgarian Socialist Party that could have led to its dissolution. According to Kutlay, MRF leader Ahmed Dogan worked to marginalize "ultra-nationalist" elements within the Turkish community and refrained from calling for autonomy or independence. The MRF later joined many of early post-communist Bulgaria's governing coalitions, though Korkmaz writes that many of the Turkish minority's problems remained unresolved. Kutlay further writes that the prospect of European Union (EU) membership had a moderating influence and contributed to the reintegration of Turks into Bulgarian society. In 2000, the EU adopted the Race Equality Directive and later formally requested Bulgaria's compliance with it. Similarly, Korkmaz writes that Bulgaria's efforts to join NATO and the EU encouraged rapid reforms aimed at reintegrating Turks and addressing the communist past.

In November 2002, the Bulgarian Orthodox Church described victims of the Revival Process, including non-Christians, as "martyrs". On January 11, 2012, the Bulgarian National Assembly officially condemned the Revival Process, although according to Tomasz Kamusella, scholars largely ignored the parliamentary recognition. Kamusella also described continued public commemorations of Todor Zhivkov in Bulgaria, including statements by national political figures praising him. After the National Assembly's declaration, the political party Ataka, described by sources as "far-right", introduced a bill contesting it. According to the bill's authors, the declaration represented a boost for separatists; Kamusella interprets that reference as referring to Bulgarian Turks and Muslims. Ataka's leader, Volen Siderov, said the declaration could expose Bulgaria to substantial compensation claims and raised the possibility that the country would be described as having carried out policies of "genocide" and "ethnic cleansing". Parliament rejected the bill. In a similar vein, Academic Natalya Lunkova notes that an anthology of memoirs by people targeted in the renaming campaign received mixed reactions in Bulgaria. Nationalists associated with the party Revival criticized the choice of topic and said attention should instead have been paid to transgressions carried out by Turks during the Ottoman occupation of Bulgaria.

The Revival Process also had lasting social and cultural effects. It affected Turkish language use in Bulgaria, and Bulgarian Turkish communities exhibit a large degree of codeswitching. During the Revival Process, knowledge of Bulgarian among younger generations became nearly universal. Academic Trupia writes that, as part of the collective trauma of the Revival Process, some Bulgarians of Muslim origin were left to wonder what their names would have been but for it. Trupia treats the renaming campaign not as a closed historical episode, but as a trauma whose effects have been passed down within families and carried into everyday life. Every year, Bulgarian Turkish groups commemorate the official end of the Revival Process – December 29 – as "Liberation Day" (Turkish: Kurtuluş Bayramı). In 2013, the Movement for Rights and Freedoms called for information about the Revival Process to be included in schoolbooks.

=== International ===
In Turkey, a number of dissident and migrant organizations were formed by people targeted by the Revival Process and the 1989 migration. Book-length works published in Turkey have often focused on individual accounts of the 1989 events and have usually appeared in limited numbers. Turkish media praised the 2012 Bulgarian National Assembly's parliamentary declaration condemning the events.

Throughout the Revival Process, many targeted people sought refuge in countries other than Turkey, especially Austria, Germany, and Sweden. Many found refuge in Australia, Canada, the United Kingdom, and the United States.

=== Responsibility ===
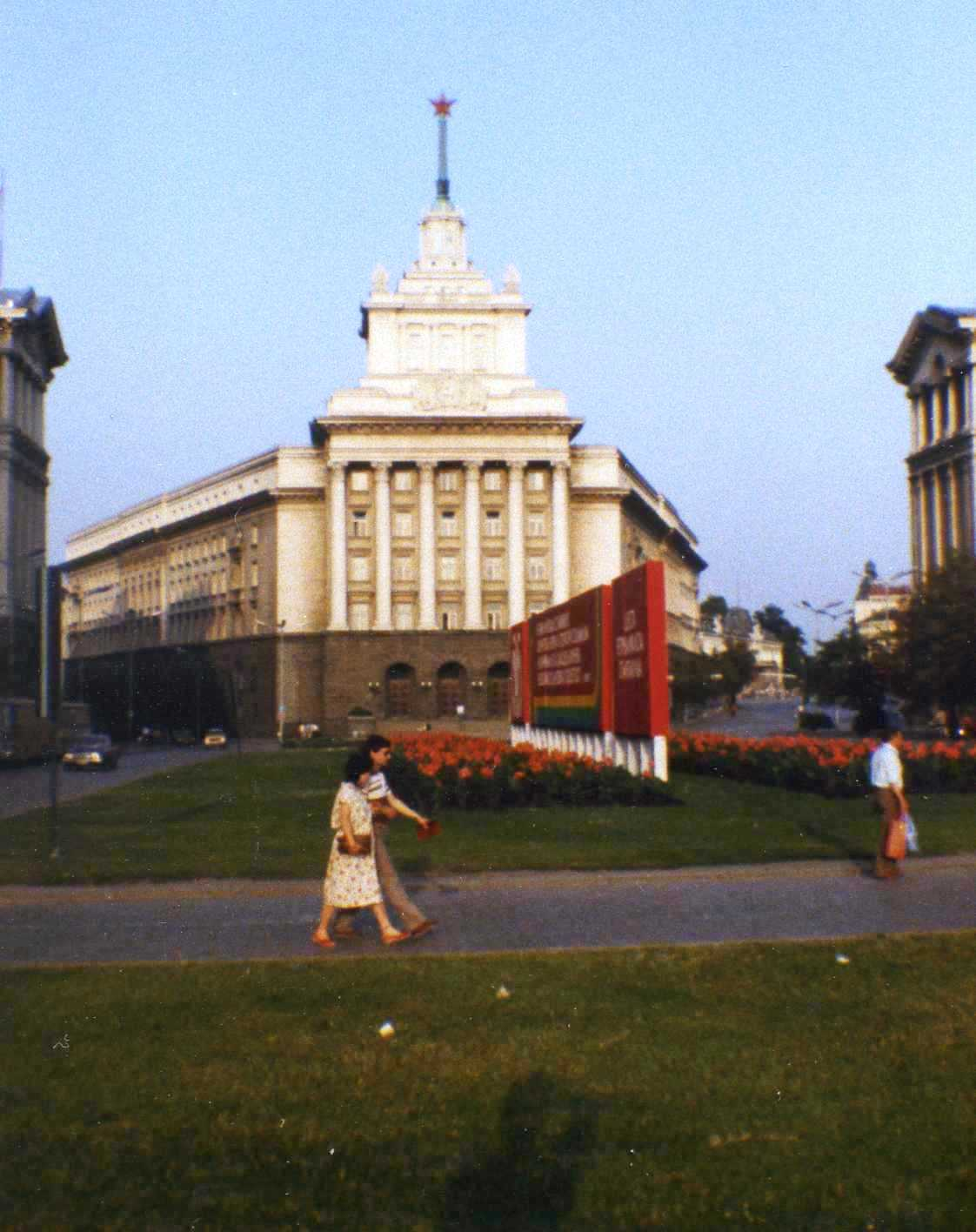
The "Party House" in 1984 The red star on its spire remained at the time of the 1990 fire.

The ruling communist party later placed personal blame on Todor Zhivkov. The 2012 parliamentary declaration attributed the Revival Process to the "totalitarian" communist government as a whole. A 1994 study found that 29 percent of ethnic Bulgarians described the Revival Process as not criminal. The same study found that Bulgarian Turks generally blamed Todor Zhivkov and his "circle", while only 2 percent blamed ethnic Bulgarians generally.

On August 26, 1990, a fire broke out at the Party House in central Sofia, then the headquarters of the Bulgarian Socialist Party (BSP), successor to the BCP. Different sources estimated the fire burned for between four-and-seven hours, destroying forty rooms and several documents. Academic Kamusella wrote that records related to the Revival Process may have been destroyed in the fire, though the extent of any such loss was unclear. Accounts of responsibility for the fire varied. Former National Assembly member and Sofia municipal councillor Vili Lilkov later stated in the first months after 1989, DS officers had been tasked with destroying or appropriating archives, and that many Ministry of Internal Affairs records had been stored in the Party House.

== In popular culture ==
Naim Süleymanoğlu (Bulgarian: Наим Сюлейманоглу) was an ethnically Turkish Olympic weightlifter born in Bulgaria in 1967 as Naim Suleimanov (Bulgarian: Наим Сюлейманов). During the Revival Process, authorities forced Süleymanoğlu to change his name to Naum Shalamanov (Bulgarian: Наум Шаламанов), under which he first became a world champion representing Bulgaria. He later defected to Turkey and gave speeches about the Revival Process, bringing attention to the campaign. Bulgaria asserted that "Turkish secret services" had kidnapped Süleymanoğlu. Laber notes that he subsequently lived freely in Turkey. Süleymanoğlu competed for Turkey in international weightlifting competitions thereafter. Following his defection, Süleymanoğlu won the gold medal in his weight class at the Summer Olympic Games in 1988, 1992, and 1996, representing Turkey. The story of Naim's life up to his defection and subsequent 1988 Olympic performance is depicted in the film Pocket Hercules: Naim Suleymanoglu.

The Turkish television presenter Gülhan Şen (Bulgarian: Гюлхан Шен), who was born in Bulgaria in 1978, was also affected by the policy. In 1985, authorities forced her to change her name to Galina Hristova Mihailova (Bulgarian: Галина Христова Михайлова), and in 1989 she moved to Turkey. The 2005 film Stolen Eyes depicts a romance between a Bulgarian Turkish woman and a non-Muslim man during the Revival Process. In 2004, author Hristo Kyuchukov published the children's book My Name Was Hussein in the United States, covering the events of the Revival Process from the point of view of a young Muslim Roma boy who is forcibly renamed.

== See also ==
- Bulgarian Turks in Turkey
- Expulsion of the Thracian Bulgarians
- Muhacir
- Romani people in Bulgaria
- Recep Küpçü

== Bibliography ==
- "По 1500 лв. взема "Герой на НРБ", Живков е 2 пъти" [“Hero of the People's Republic of Bulgaria” receives 1,500 leva; Zhivkov is twice one]. 168 Chasa (in Bulgarian). October 26, 2021.
- Angelov, Vesselin (2009). Борба без оръжие! Турско националноосвободително движение в България (1985–1986). Документи [Struggle without weapons! Turkish National Liberation Movement in Bulgaria (1985–1986). Documents] (in Bulgarian). Sofia: Liberal Integration Foundation. ISBN 978-954-617-085-9. Archived from the original on February 28, 2026.
- Arhsien, Patrick F. R.; Howells, R. A. (1981). "Yugoslavia, Albania and the Kosovo Riots". The World Today. 37 (11): 419–427. JSTOR 40395240.
- Aslan, Senem (2009). "Incoherent State: The Controversy over Kurdish Naming in Turkey". European Journal of Turkish Studies. 10 (10). doi:10.4000/ejts.4142.
- Atanasova, Ivanka Nedeva (2004). "Lyudmila Zhivkova and the Paradox of Ideology and Identity in Communist Bulgaria". East European Politics and Societies. 18 (2): 278–315. doi:10.1177/0888325404263413.
- Avramov, Rumen (2016). Икономика на Възродителния процес [The Economics of the Revival Process] (PDF) (in Bulgarian). Sofia: Centre for Advanced Study. ISBN 978-954-320-582-0. Archived (PDF) from the original on June 16, 2024.
- Baeva, Iskra (2012). "The Day Before the Crash: Bulgarian-Soviet Relations in the Nineteen Eighties" (PDF). Studia z Dziejów Rosji i Europy Środkowo-Wschodniej. 47 (Special Issue): 7–22. doi:10.12775/SDR.2012.15.
- Banik, Sajib Kumar (2023). "Turkey's Paradigm Shifting since 1980s: A Historic Transformation from Kemalist Secularism to Islamist Politics" (PDF). The Dhaka University Studies. 80 (1–2): 31–48. doi:10.62296/DUS8020222024003.
- "History". Belene Island Foundation. September 25, 2023. Archived from the original on November 9, 2025.
- Bojkov, Victor D. (2004). "Bulgaria's Turks in the 1980s: A Minority Endangered". Journal of Genocide Research. 6 (3): 343–369. doi:10.1080/1462352042000265846.
- Borden, Milena Savova-Mahon (2001). The Politics of Nationalism under Communism in Bulgaria: Myths, Memories, and Minorities (PDF) (PhD thesis). London: University of London, School of Slavonic and East European Studies. Archived (PDF) from the original on September 27, 2025.
- The Human Rights of Muslims in Bulgaria in Law and Politics since 1878 (Report). Bulgarian Helsinki Committee. 2003. Archived from the original on April 16, 2024. Alt URL
- "Declaration condemning the attempted forcible assimilation of Bulgarian Muslims" (in Bulgarian). Bulgarian National Assembly. January 11, 2012. Archived from the original on February 3, 2023.
- "Откраднати очи" [Stolen eyes]. Odeon (in Bulgarian). Bulgarian National Film Archive.
- "31 years after the attack at Bunovo station". Bulgarian National Radio. September 3, 2016. Archived from the original on December 25, 2024.
- "30 Years since the Historical Visit to Bulgaria by Francois Mitterrand". Bulgarian National Radio. January 18, 2019. Archived from the original on February 25, 2026.
- "Appellate Court-Sofia Reopens the "Revival Process" Case". Bulgarian National Radio. December 27, 2022.
- "Victims of so-called "Revival Process" honored near Mogilyane". Bulgarian National Radio. December 26, 2023. Archived from the original on February 25, 2026.
- Bulgarian National Television (January 18, 2015). "На днешния ден преди 30 години - появява се формулировката "възродителен процес"" [On this day 30 years ago – the formulation "Revival Process" appears]. BNT News (in Bulgarian). Bulgarian National Television.
- Büchsenschütz, Ulrich (2000). Малцинствената политика в България. Политиката на БКП към евреи, роми, помаци и турци (1944-1989) [Minority policy in Bulgaria. The policy of the BCP towards Jews, Roma, Pomaks and Turks (1944-1989).] (PDF) (in Bulgarian). International Center for Minority Studies and Intercultural Relations. ISBN 954-8872-24-2. Archived from the original (PDF) on September 26, 2007.
- "Доган – пет години по-рано" [Dogan – five years earlier]. Capital (in Bulgarian). October 25, 1997. Archived from the original on December 19, 2024.
- Central Intelligence Agency (1985). European Review (Report). Central Intelligence Agency.
- Population and Housing Census in the People's Republic of Bulgaria Held on the 4-th of December 1985: Methodology and main results. Central Statistical Office. 1988. OCLC 1341991513 – via Google Books.
- "Съдът: Делото за "Възродителния процес" е прекратено неправилно" [Court: The case for the Revival process has been terminated incorrectly]. Sega (in Bulgarian). December 27, 2022. Archived from the original on February 28, 2026.
- "Постановление № 15 на Министерския съвет от 1977 г.: Внедряване на единна система за гражданска регистрация и административно обслужване на населението (ЕСГРАОН)" [Decree No. 15 of the Council of Ministers (1977): Introduction of a unified system for civil registration and administrative services for the population (ESGRAON)]. Public consultation portal (in Bulgarian). March 11, 1977. Archived from the original on December 11, 2025.
- Curtis, Glenn E., ed. (1993). Bulgaria: A Country Study (PDF). Area handbook series (2nd ed.). Federal Research Division, Library of Congress. ISBN 0-8444-0751-8. Archived (PDF) from the original on September 6, 2025.
- Dayıoğlu, Ali (2007). "Minority Policy in Bulgaria After 1989: The Case of the Muslim-Turkish Minority" (PDF). Minority Issues in the Balkans and the EU. Foundation for Middle East and Balkan Studies: 91–112.
- Dayıoğlu, Ali (April 2012). "Muslim-Turkish Minority's Freedom of Religion and Conscience and the Problem of Head Muftiate in Bulgaria Between 1989 and 2011" (PDF). Journal of Social Sciences. 5 (1). Near East University: 2–33.
- Dechev, Stefan (December 27, 2024). ""Да знаем всяко село как замръква". Защо смяната на имената не е "случайно хрумване"" ["To know how every village ends and begins the day". Why the name changes were not a "random whim"]. Svobodna Europa (in Bulgarian).
- Demirhan, Hasan (2019). "Bulgaristan Türklerine uygulanan zorla isim değiştirme kampanyası ve Türk basını (Aralık 1984-Mart 1985)" [The forced name-change campaign applied to Turks in Bulgaria and the Turkish press (December 1984-March 1985)]. RumeliDE Dil ve Edebiyat Araştırmaları Dergisi (in Turkish) (17): 252–272. doi:10.29000/rumelide.656753.
- Dimitrov, Vesselin (December 23, 2000). In Search of a Homogeneous Nation: The Assimilation of Bulgaria's Turkish Minority, 1984–1985 (PDF) (Report). European Centre for Minority Issues. Archived (PDF) from the original on February 23, 2026.
- Elchinova, Magdalena (2001). "Ethnic Discourse and Group Presentation in Modern Bulgarian Society". Development and Society. 30 (1). Institute for Social Development and Policy Research: 51–78. JSTOR deveandsoci.30.1.51 – via JSTOR.
- Eminov, Ali (1986). "Are Turkish-speakers in Bulgaria of Ethnic Bulgarian Origin?". Journal of the Institute of Muslim Minority Affairs. 7 (2): 503–518. doi:10.1080/13602008608715999.
- Eminov, Ali (November 1989). The Elimination of Turkish Language Instruction in Bulgaria (PDF) (Report). Educational Resources Information Center.
- Eminov, Ali (1997). "Islam and Muslims in Bulgaria: A Brief History". Islamic Studies. 36 (2/3): 209–241. JSTOR 23076195 – via JSTOR.
- Eminov, Ali (1997). Turkish and Other Muslim Minorities in Bulgaria. Psychology Press. ISBN 978-0-415-91976-0 – via Google Books.
- Eminov, Ali (July 1, 2007). "Social Construction of Identities: Pomaks in Bulgaria" (PDF). Journal on Ethnopolitics and Minority Issues in Europe. 6 (2). European Centre for Minority Issues: 1–25. Archived (PDF) from the original on May 17, 2025.
- Erolova, Yelis (July 26, 2025). "Bulgarian Forced Assimilation Policy and the So-Called "Revival Process" Towards Turks and Muslims in Bulgaria 40 Years Later: Documents, Studies and Memories". Histories. 5 (3) 33. doi:10.3390/histories5030033.
- East Europe Report: Basic Results from the 1985 Bulgarian Census (PDF) (Report). Foreign Broadcast Information Service. October 28, 1986. Archived from the original (PDF) on January 4, 2026 – via Defense Technical Information Center.
- Forestier-Peyrat, Etienne (2021). "Communist Europe and the Kurdish Question During the Cold War (1940s–1980s)". Kurdish Studies. 9 (2): 175–187. doi:10.33182/ks.v9i2.568 (inactive July 28, 2026).
- Gorcheva, Daniela (March 4, 2009). "Съпротивата на турците бе катализатор и за нашите меки интелигентски акции" [The resistance of the Turks was also a catalyst for our gentle intellectual actions]. Mediapool.bg (in Bulgarian).
- "History". Grand Mufti's Office of the Republic of Bulgaria Muslim Denomination. Archived from the original on March 5, 2024.
- Gruev, Mihail; Kalyonski, Aleksey (2008). Възродителният процес: Мюсюлманските общности и комунистическият режим: политики, реакции и последици [The Revival Process: The Muslim Communities and the Communist Regime: Policies, Reactions and Consequences] (in Bulgarian). Sofia: Ciela. ISBN 978-954-28-0291-4 – via Internet Archive.
- "Gülhan Şen kimdir?" [Who is Gülhan Şen?]. Haber61 (in Turkish). August 29, 2019. Archived from the original on February 27, 2026.
- Hillgren, Johanna (2009). "20 år sedan bulgarienturkarna kom" [20 years since the Bulgarian Turks came]. Hallands Nyheter (in Swedish). Archived from the original on June 4, 2023.
- Hoyer, Steny (March 2, 1989). "Bulgaria Stamps Out a Minority". The Christian Science Monitor. Archived from the original on February 13, 2025.
- Hristov, Hristo (September 29, 2012). "За първи път: Досието на Ахмед Доган онлайн. Част 5.1: За преименуването в Кърджали и Хасково през 1984 г." [For the first time: Ahmed Dogan's file online. Part 5.1: On the renaming of Kardzhali and Haskovo in 1984.]. desebg.com (in Bulgarian). Archived from the original on May 20, 2013.
- Hristov, Hristo (May 20, 2014). "Президентът Росен Плевнелиев: Комунистическият режим потъпка българския национален идеал" [President Rosen Plevneliev: The communist regime trampled on the Bulgarian national ideal]. desebg.com (in Bulgarian). Archived from the original on January 15, 2026.
- Human Rights Watch (1989). "Human Rights Watch World Report 1989 - Bulgaria". Human Rights Watch. Archived from the original on December 26, 2024.
- Human Rights Watch (January 1, 1991). "Human Rights Watch World Report 1990 - Bulgaria". Refworld. United Nations High Commissioner for Refugees.
- Human Rights Watch (1994). China: Use of Criminal Charges Against Political Dissidents (PDF) (Report). Human Rights Watch. Archived (PDF) from the original on December 15, 2021.
- Ivanov, Ivo Kirilov; Önsoy, Murat (2022). "From Integration to Assimilation and Forced Migration: An Evaluation of the Bulgarian Communist Party's Turkish Minority Policy" (PDF). Bilig (103): 31–58. doi:10.12995/bilig.10302.
- Ivanova, Veneta T. (2022). "Socialism with an Occult Face: Aesthetics, Spirituality, and Utopia in Late Socialist Bulgaria". East European Politics and Societies. 36 (2): 558–581. doi:10.1177/0888325420961159. hdl:1814/70020.
- Ivanova, Diana (May 29, 2024). "Без име и език, а накрая без дом и държава. Как преди 35 години бяха изгонени българските турци" [Without a name and language, and finally without a home and state: How Bulgarian Turks were expelled 35 years ago]. Свободна Европа (in Bulgarian).
- Kalaitzaki, Theodora (2001). "Turkey and Bulgaria in the post-Cold War Era: a success story". Balkan Studies. 42 (2): 267–290.
- Kalinova, Evgenia; Baeva, Iskra (2009). Baeva, Iskra; Kalinova, Evgenia (eds.). "Възродителният процес". Том I – Българската държава и българските турци (средата на 30-те – началото на 90-те години на ХХ век) ["The Revival Process". Volume I – The Bulgarian State and the Bulgarian Turks (mid-1930s – early 1990s)]. Sofia: Държавна агенция "Архиви". pp. 5–42. ISBN 978-954-9800-80-7.
- Kalinova, Evgenia (2016). "Изселнически практики и политиката на България (края на XIX – края на XX век)" [Emigration practices and Bulgaria's policy (late 19th–late 20th century)]. In Mihneva, Rumyana; Baeva, Iskra; Grozev, Kostadin (eds.). Миграциите: Европа между историческия опит и страховете на съвременността [Migrations: Europe Between Historical Experience and the Fears of the Present] (in Bulgarian). Sofia: Kameya Grup OOD. pp. 111–136.
- Kalyonski, Aleksey (August 6, 2009). ""Възродителният процес" от 1984 – 1989 г. Част 1" [The "Revival Process" 1984–1989. Part 1]. Liberal Review (in Bulgarian). Archived from the original on February 28, 2026.
- Kalyonski, Aleksey (December 31, 2009). "1989 – Майските събития и "Голямата екскурзия"" [1989 – The May Events and the "Big Excursion"]. Liberal Review (in Bulgarian). Archived from the original on February 28, 2026.
- Kamberi, Drenusha; Rexhepi, Hava; Kamberi, Gojart (2024). "Discrimination Policies That Lead to Forced Migration: The Question of the Bulgarian Turks Within United Nations (1988–1989)" (PDF). Philosophica. 11 (22–23): 59–70. doi:10.62792/ut.philosophica.v11.i22-23.p272260 (inactive July 28, 2026).
- Kamusella, Tomasz (September 7, 2018). "Bulgaria: an unlikely personality cult". New Eastern Europe. Archived from the original on February 25, 2026.
- Kamusella, Tomasz (2019). Ethnic Cleansing During the Cold War: The Forgotten 1989 Expulsion of Turks from Communist Bulgaria. London: Routledge. doi:10.4324/9781351062701. ISBN 978-1138480520.
- Kamusella, Tomasz (2020). "Between Politics and Objectivity: The Non-Remembrance of the 1989 Ethnic Cleansing of Turks in Communist Bulgaria". Journal of Genocide Research. 22 (4): 515–532. doi:10.1080/14623528.2020.1726649. hdl:10023/23778.
- Karahasan-Çınar, İbrahim (2005). Етнически малцинства в България [Ethnic Minorities in Bulgaria] (in Bulgarian). Sofia: LIK. ISBN 954-607-678-3. Archived from the original on February 28, 2026 – via Regional library catalog.
- Katsikas, Stefanos (2011). Negotiating Diplomacy in the New Europe: Foreign Policy in Post-Communist Bulgaria. I.B. Tauris. ISBN 978-1845118853.
- "Türkân Bebek kaç aylıktı?" [How old was baby Türkan?]. Kırcaali Haber (in Turkish). January 16, 2018. Archived from the original on September 17, 2019.
- Kolev, Yoan (August 29, 2015). "1998: Todor Zhivkov – death of a dictator". Bulgarian National Radio. Archived from the original on February 28, 2026.
- Kolev, Yoan (August 26, 2020). "30 години след палежа, бившият Партиен дом отново е свидетел на протести" [30 years after the arson, the former Party House is once again witnessing protests]. Bulgarian National Radio (in Bulgarian).
- Korkmaz, Nuri (2022). "Being Identified as a Double Threat to Communism and Nationalism: Dissidents from the Turkish Minority in Bulgaria During 1984–1990's and the Archival Resources". Matériaux pour l'histoire de notre temps (145–146): 87–94. doi:10.3917/mate.145.0087.
- Kutlay, Muzaffer (2017). "The Turks of Bulgaria: An Outlier Case of Forced Migration and Voluntary Return" (PDF). International Migration. 55 (5). University of Kent: 162–179. doi:10.1111/imig.12381. Archived (PDF) from the original on February 25, 2026 – via Kent Academic Repository.
- Kuzay, Tuncer M. (March 1986). Oppression and Persecution of the Turkish Minority in Bulgaria (Report). Wheaton, Illinois: United Turkish Americans.
- Kyuchukov, Hristo (April 1, 2004). My Name Was Hussein. Illustrated by Allan Eitzen. Boyds Mills Press. ISBN 978-0-613-78874-8.
- Laber, Jeri (1987). Destroying Ethnic Identity: The Turks of Bulgaria. Human Rights Watch. ISBN 978-0-938579-66-3 – via Google Books.
- Lévesque, Jacques (1997). The Enigma of 1989: The USSR and the Liberation of Eastern Europe. University of California Press.
- Lunkova, Natalya A. (2019). "«Когда у меня отняли имя»: об одном болгарско-турецком научном проекте" ["When my name was taken from me": on a Bulgarian–Turkish scholarly project]. The Slavic World in the Third Millennium (in Russian). 14 (3–4). Moscow: Institute of Slavic Studies: 214–222. doi:10.31168/2412-6446.2019.14.3-4.15. Archived from the original on February 25, 2026.
- Maeva, Mila (2008). "Modern Migration Waves of Bulgarian Turks". In Marushiakova, Elena (ed.). Dynamics of National Identity and Transnational Identities in the Process of European Integration. Newcastle upon Tyne: Cambridge Scholars Publishing. ISBN 9781847184719.
- Maeva, Mila (2017). "Turkish Religious Identity in Bulgaria in the Last Twenty-Four Years (1989–2013)". In Anastasova, Ekaterina; Kõiva, Mare (eds.). Balkan and Balticum: Current Studies in the Postsocialist Space (PDF). Sator. Vol. 18. Tartu: Eesti Kirjandusmuuseumi Teaduskirjastus. pp. 94–117. doi:10.7592/Sator.2017.18.05. ISBN 978-9949-586-61-5.
- Maeva, Mila (October 1, 2022). ""Възродителният процес" (1984–1989 г.)" [The Revival Process (1984–1989)]. Либерален преглед (in Bulgarian).
- Mahon, Milena (1999). "The Turkish Minority under Communist Bulgaria—Politics of Ethnicity and Power". Journal of Southern Europe and the Balkans. 1 (2): 149–162. doi:10.1080/14613199908413996.
- Malakchiev, Atanas (December 29, 2025). "December 29, 1989: "Revival Process" Officially Ends". BTA. Bulgarian News Agency.
- Bg, Marica (January 18, 2020). "Арестуват Тодор Живков на този ден преди 30 години" [Todor Zhivkov was arrested on this day 30 years ago]. marica.bg (in Bulgarian).
- Martino, Francesco (November 4, 2009). "The Big Excursion of Bulgarian Turks". OBC Transeuropa. Archived from the original on February 25, 2026.
- Martinova, Elitsa (June 6, 2012). "Волен не успя да защити "Възродителния процес"" [Volen failed to defend the "Revival Process"]. OFFNews (in Bulgarian).
- Marušiakova, Elena; Popov, Veselin (2000). "The Bulgarian Gypsies – Searching Their Place in the Society" (PDF). Balkanologie. 4 (2). doi:10.4000/balkanologie.323.
- Mayuhtar-May, Fatme (2014). Identity, Nationalism, and Cultural Heritage under Siege: Five Narratives of Pomak Heritage: From Forced Renaming to Weddings (PDF). Balkan Studies Library. Leiden: Brill. doi:10.1163/9789004272088. ISBN 978-90-04-27207-1.
- "Справка на Главна прокуратура за делото по "Възродителния" процес" [Report of the Chief Prosecutor's Office on the case concerning the "Revival Process"]. Mediapool.bg (in Bulgarian). July 3, 2003.
- "За тези събития трябва да пише в учебниците" [These Events Need to be Discussed in the History Textbooks]. Mediapool.bg (in Bulgarian). 2009.
- Meznik, Michael; Thieme, Tom (2012). "Against all Expectations: Right-Wing Extremism in Romania and Bulgaria". In Backes, Uwe; Moreau, Patrick (eds.). The Extreme Right in Europe: Current Trends and Perspectives. Göttingen: Vandenhoeck & Ruprecht. pp. 195–214. ISBN 978-3-525-36922-7.
- "СОЦИАЛИЗЪМ. Хронологична таблица" [Socialism. Chronological table] (in Bulgarian). Bulgarian Ministry of Foreign Affairs. June 20, 2007. Archived from the original on June 30, 2007.
- "Население по местоживеене, пол и етническа група" [Population by place of residence, sex and ethnic group] (in Bulgarian). Bulgarian National Statistical Institute. Archived from the original on May 30, 2017.
- "Cep Herkülü: Naim Süleymanoğlu'nun yönetmeni Özer Feyzioğlu: Kendini feda etme öyküsünü anlatıyoruz". NTV (in Turkish).
- Oliver, Brian (December 3, 2017). "Naim Süleymanoğlu obituary". The Guardian. London. Archived from the original on February 25, 2025.
- "Naim Süleymanoğlu". Olympics.com. International Olympic Committee. Archived from the original on February 25, 2026.
- Oprea, Iulia Alexandra (2014). "State-Led Islamization: The Turkish-Islamic Synthesis". Studia Universitatis Petru Maior. Historia. 14 (1): 131–139.
- Öz, Yunus (2024). Muslims of Central Eurasia in the 21st Century: Challenges, Opportunities, and Prospects (PDF). IKI Academy.
- "Belene Concentration Camp". Pametbg.com.
- Parliamentary Assembly of the Council of Europe (September 26, 1985). Situation of ethnic and Muslim minorities in Bulgaria (Resolution 846). Council of Europe.
- Petkova, Lilia (June 2002). "The Ethnic Turks in Bulgaria: Social Integration and Impact on Bulgarian–Turkish Relations, 1947–2000" (PDF). The Global Review of Ethnopolitics. 1 (4): 42–59. doi:10.1080/14718800208405112.
- Pashova, Anastasya (2009). "The Muslim Roma - an "Inconvenient" for the Communist Regime Minority". In Popova, Kristina; Piskova, Marijana; Lanzinger, Margareth; Langreiter, Nikola; Vodenicharov, Petar (eds.). Women and Minorities: Ways of Archiving. Women and Minorities Archives. Vol. 1. Sofia; Vienna: Semarsh. ISBN 978-9549590036.
- Poulton, Hugh (1991). Balkans: Minorities and States in Conflict (PDF). London: Minority Rights Group. ISBN 1873194404. Archived from the original (PDF) on July 1, 2025.
- Popova, Ekaterina; Hajdinjak, Marko, eds. (2006). Forced Ethnic Migrations on the Balkans: Consequences and Rebuilding of Societies (PDF). Conference Proceedings, 22–23 February 2005. Sofia; Tokyo: International Centre for Minority Studies and Intercultural Relations; Meiji University. ISBN 978-954-8872-61-4.
- Ragaru, Nadège (2023). "Symbolic Time(s) of Violence in Late Socialist Bulgaria" (PDF). Slavic Review. 82 (1): 48–68. doi:10.1017/slr.2023.103.
- Rensmann, Lars (2011). ""Against Globalism": Counter-Cosmopolitan Discontent and Antisemitism in Mobilizations of European Extreme Right Parties". Politics and Resentment. Brill. pp. 117–146. doi:10.1163/9789004190474_004. ISBN 978-90-04-19047-4.
- Rudin, Catherine; Eminov, Ali (Spring–Summer 1990). "Bulgarian Turkish: The Linguistic Effects of Recent Nationality Policy". Anthropological Linguistics. 32 (1/2): 149–162. JSTOR 30028144.
- Salifova, Fikrie (February 14, 2002). "Скандал около погребение разбуни духовете в Завоя" [A funeral scandal has stirred up spirits in Zavoya]. Bgnews.bg (in Bulgarian). Archived from the original on July 6, 2011.
- Sevim, Seçkin; Aydın Sevim, Bilgen (October 15, 2022). ""Sizler de Unutmayın Beni Türkiye'deki Kardeşlerim": Yeniden Doğmak Dizisi ve Duygu Politikası" ["Do Not Forget Me, My Brothers and Sisters in Turkey": The Series Yeniden Doğmak and the Politics of Emotion]. Akademik İncelemeler Dergisi [Journal of Academic Inquiries] (in Turkish). 17 (2): 327–345. doi:10.17550/akademikincelemeler.1152589.
- Şimşir, Bilâl (1988). The Turks of Bulgaria (1878-1985). Nicosia: K. Rustem and Brother. ISBN 978-9963-565-10-8.
- "The Revival Process and Naim Süleymanoğlu". Socrates Dergi (in Turkish). 2015. Archived from the original on November 25, 2020.
- "Bulgaria's MRF, Other Ethnic Turkish Parties Commemorate Victims of Communist-era 'Revival Process'". The Sofia Globe. December 26, 2018.
- "ДПС иска Възродителния процес в учебниците" [DPS wants the Revival Process in textbooks]. Стандарт (in Bulgarian). Агенция Стандарт. March 17, 2013.
- Stoyanov, Valeri (1998). Турското население в България между полюсите на етническата политика [The Turkish Population in Bulgaria Between the Poles of Ethnic Policy] (in Bulgarian). Sofia: LIK. ISBN 954-607-121-8.
- Tahir, Nevzat Ali (2013). Minority Rights in Bulgaria and Greece, and the Impact of European Integration (PDF) (PhD thesis). University of Trieste.
- Trifonova Price, Lada (2022). "Between a rock and a hard place: continued struggle of media and journalism in Bulgaria's media system" (PDF). In Iordanidou, Sofia; Dagoula, Chrysi (eds.). 6+1 Proposals for Journalism: Safeguarding the Field in the Digital Era. Bristol: Intellect. pp. 90–104.
- Trupia, Francesco (2022). "What would have been my name? The Post-Memory of the "Generation After" the Revival Process in Bulgaria" (PDF). Contemporary Southeastern Europe. 9 (1): 47–64. doi:10.25364/02.9:2022.1.4. Archived (PDF) from the original on February 25, 2026 – via Central European University.
- United Nations Commission on Human Rights (January 6, 1988). Report submitted by Mr. Angelo Vidal d'Almeida Ribeiro, Special Rapporteur appointed in accordance with resolution 1986/20 of the Commission on Human Rights (Report). United Nations. E/CN.4/1988/45.
- "Minorities at Risk Project, Chronology for Turks in Bulgaria". Refworld. United Nations High Commissioner for Refugees. 2004. Archived from the original on September 15, 2023.
- "Bulgaria's Zhivkov Under House Arrest, Will Face Charges". Los Angeles Times. United Press International. January 19, 1990.
- United States Commission on Security and Cooperation in Europe (1985). Implementation of the Helsinki Accords: The Ottawa Human Rights Experts Meeting and the Future of the Helsinki Process: Hearing Before the Commission on Security and Cooperation in Europe, Ninety-ninth Congress, First Session (PDF). Washington, D.C.: U.S. Government Printing Office.
- United States Commission on Security and Cooperation in Europe (December 1988). Reform and Human Rights in Eastern Europe (PDF) (Report). Washington, D.C.: U.S. Government Printing Office.
- United States Department of State (November 28, 1984). Seventeenth Semiannual Report by the President to the Commission on Security and Cooperation in Europe on the Implementation of the Helsinki Final Act: April 1, 1984 – October 1, 1984 (PDF) (Report). Ronald Reagan Presidential Library.
- Vachkov, Daniel (2018). Аварии и катастрофи. Хроника на социалистическата индустриализация [Accidents and Catastrophes: A Chronicle of Socialist Industrialization] (PDF) (in Bulgarian). Sofia: Siela. ISBN 978-954-28-2486-2.
- Vaksberg, Tatiana (November 19, 2010). "Сякаш не е имало Възродителен процес..." [As if there was no Revival process...]. Deutsche Welle (in Bulgarian). Archived from the original on March 28, 2023.
- Vaksberg, Tatiana (2014). "Recalling the fate of Bulgaria's Turkish minority". Deutsche Welle. Archived from the original on February 25, 2026.
- Vassilev, Rossen (2010). "Restoring the Ethnolinguistic Rights of Bulgaria's Turkish Minority". Ethnopolitics. 9 (3): 295–309. doi:10.1080/17449050903551859.
- Vladimirova, Svetlana (August 26, 2023). "Имало ли е сглобка за подпалването на Партийния дом?" [Was there a set-up behind the arson of the Party House?]. Standart (in Bulgarian).
- Yolcu, Cengiz (December 2021). ""Kölelerin İsyanı"nı Bastırmak: Bulgaristan'da Yasaklanan Bir Film ve Türkiye" [Suppressing "The Slave Revolt": A Film Banned in Bulgaria and Turkey]. Journal of Balkan and Black Sea Studies (in Turkish) (7): 55–82.
- Zang Jr., Theodore (1990). News from Bulgaria: Deep Tensions Continue in Turkish Provinces, Despite Some Human Rights Improvements (PDF) (Report). Helsinki Watch (Human Rights Watch). Archived (PDF) from the original on February 25, 2026.
- Zafer, Zeynep (2010). "Bulgaristan Türklerinin 1984-1989 Eritme Politikasına Karşı Direnişi" [Bulgarian Turks' Resistance Against 1984–1989 Melting Pot Policy] (PDF). Gazi Academic Perspective (in Turkish). 3 (6): 27–44.
