= To Be Reborn =

- Also known as: Revival Process
- Yeniden Doğmak
- Genre: Drama
- Written by: Sevinç Çokum
- Directed by: Osman F. Seden
- Starring: Aydan Şener; Serdar Gökhan; Mine Çayıroğlu; Belgin Güven; İsmet Özhan; Kenan Pars; Burçin Terzioğlu
- Music by: Esin Engin
- Country of origin: Turkey
- Original language: Turkish
- No. of seasons: 1
- No. of episodes: 4

Production
- Producer: Osman F. Seden
- Production company: TRT

Original release
- Network: TRT 1
- Release: 1987

To Be Reborn (Turkish: Yeniden Doğmak) is a Turkish television drama series that aired on TRT 1 in 1987. The series follows the young Bulgarian Turkish girl Aysel Özgür in the face of assimilation policies targeting Turks in Bulgaria. Osman F. Seden served as the director of the series and Sevinç Çokum as its screenwriter.

== Development ==
The series was based on a true story, and it was written by Sevinç Çokum on the basis of assimilation policies faced by the Turkish minority in Bulgaria at the time.

== Plot ==
The series depicts the migration of members of the Bulgarian Turkish minority in 1987, with a focus on the girl Aysel Özgür and her family. The Özgür family is forced to leave Aysel behind in Bulgaria due to government pressure while the rest of the family leaves for Turkey. The Bulgarian government changes Aysel's name to Aleksandra and seeks to make her forget about her family.

== Release ==
The series released on TRT 1 on December 13, 1987 and concluded on December 27, of the same year after just two episodes. Though the third episode of the series was finished, it did not air at that time. TRT initially claimed that the film for the episode had been torn. Episode three was eventually given a straight-to-video release along with a final fourth episode of the series. All four episodes were later broadcast on TRT in 1989.

By the time of the release of the series, the Turkish public was acutely aware of the persecution of ethnic-Turks in Bulgaria due to sustained media attention. As a result, following the release, the series was widely discussed in Turkey.

== Reception ==
The first two episodes had a large emotional impact in Turkey, leading to the emptying of city streets during airings. A large number of Turkish babies were given the name "Aysel".

== International relations ==
The series was the subject of an international dispute between Turkey and Bulgaria. While the issues with the release of the third episode in the series were initially explained to the Turkish public as the result of technical difficulties, the real reason for the episode's delayed release was an international agreement between Bulgaria and Turkey.

Owing to the agreement, the real-life Aysel was allowed to leave Bulgaria for Turkey and rejoin her family. Aysel was flown to Turkey on the night of December 30–31, 1987 and landed at Atatürk Airport in Istanbul alongside the Turkish ambassador to Bulgaria. this event was broadcast live on TRT. Aysel's parents, living in the Turkish city of Mudanya, were not informed about this event until it was formally confirmed by Turkish authorities. On January 1, 1988, Turkish prime minister Turgut Özal acknowledged the agreement with Bulgaria and promised not to air episodes after the second at a subsequent press conference.

== Aysel Özgür ==
The real Aysel Özgür's family came to Turkey in 1983 and were forced to leave then 12-year-old Aysel behind. The family chose to take their son, Mehmet, with them to Turkey in lieu of Aysel as they were only able to take one of their two children with them. In Turkey, the Özgürs agitated for their daughter's release, eventually leading to the inclusion of Aysel's situation in negotiations between the Turkish and Bulgarian governments.

Following Aysel's return to Turkey, she stayed at the prime minister's residence in Istanbul for three days before she was reunited with her family. Aysel went to finish her education in Turkey and later worked for the city of Osmangazi. She had three children in Turkey.

== Episodes ==
No.	Title	Directed by	Written by	Original release date
1	"Part 1"	Osman F. Seden	Sevinç Çokum	December 13, 1987
Bulgarian soldiers drag men out of their homes in a Turkish village and brutalize those who resist, including killing the town's muezzin. The worsening state of religious life for Bulgarian Muslims is depicted, including, implicitly, the alleged-killing of ethnic-Turkish patients by regime doctors.
2	"Part 2"	Osman F. Seden	Sevinç Çokum	December 20, 1987
Many among the Turkish minority choose to leave the country while others resolve to resist the Bulgarian policies. Aysel's parents, Salih and Fatma Özgür, are able to leave Bulgaria, but must leave Aysel with her aunt and grandmother.
3	"Part 3"	Osman F. Seden	Sevinç Çokum	1989 (Note: The third episode was scheduled to air on December 27, 1987, but was not shown as planned due to an international agreement between Bulgaria and Turkey. It was given a straight-to-video release by Varlık Film prior to its 1989 airing.)
Aysel thinks on her future life in Turkey.
4	"Part 4"	Osman F. Seden	Sevinç Çokum	1989 (Note: It was given a straight-to-video release by Varlık Film prior to its 1989 airing.)
Yusuf, Sait, and Hüseyin flee Bulgaria. At the end of the episode, Aysel gives a Turkish-nationalistic farewell speech.

== Cast ==
- Aydan Şener (Fatma)
- Serdar Gökhan (Yusuf)
- Mine Çayıroğlu (Aysel)
- Belgin Güven
- İsmet Özhan (Baba)
- Kenan Pars (Bulgarian Commander)
- Burçin Terzioğlu
- Atilla Yiğit
- Tomris Oğuzalp
- Orhan Hızlı
- Necdet Türkantoz (Civil Bulgarian Committee Member)
- Kamran Usluer
- Haluk Kurtoğlu
- Sadettin Erbil
- Kamran Usluer
- Memduh Ün (Hakim)

== See also ==
- Time of Violence
- Belene

== Bibliography ==
- Akpınar, Köksal (21 February 2024). "Aysel 36 yıl sonra tekrar TRT'de" [Aysel Returns to TRT After 36 Years]. TRT Haber (in Turkish). Archived from the original on 31 May 2026.
- Aşık, Süleyman (2024). "Bulgaristan'dan Türkiye'ye Göçün Bir Simgesi: Aysel Özgür Olayı (1986–1987)" [A Symbol of Migration from Bulgaria to Turkey: The Aysel Özgür Incident (1986–1987)]. Eren Dergisi (in Turkish). 3 (5): 11–25. Archived from the original on 31 May 2026.
- Öztaş, Sezai; Demir, Sevilay (2023). "1989 Yılı Bulgaristan'dan Zorunlu Türk Göçünün Türk TV Dizilerinde Temsili: "Yeniden Doğmak" Örneği" [The Representation of the Forced Turkish Migration from Bulgaria in 1989 in Turkish TV Series: The Case of "Yeniden Doğmak"]. HUMANITAS - Uluslararası Sosyal Bilimler Dergisi (in Turkish). 11 (INCSOS VIII Özel Sayısı): 249–272. Archived from the original on 31 May 2026.
- Sevim, Seçkin; Aydın Sevim, Bilgen (2022). ""Sizler de Unutmayın Beni Türkiye'deki Kardeşlerim": Yeniden Doğmak Dizisi ve Duygu Politikası" ["Don't You Forget Me Either, My Siblings in Turkey": The Series To Be Reborn and the Politics of Emotion]. Journal of Academic Inquiries (in Turkish). 17 (2): 327–345. Archived from the original on 31 May 2026.
- "Yeniden Doğmak 1. Bölüm" [To Be Reborn, Part 1]. YouTube (in Turkish). TRT Nostalji.
- "Yeniden Doğmak 2. Bölüm" [To Be Reborn, Part 2]. YouTube (in Turkish). TRT Nostalji.
- "Yeniden Doğmak 3. Bölüm" [To Be Reborn, Part 3]. YouTube (in Turkish). TRT Nostalji.
- "Yeniden Doğmak 4. Bölüm (Final)" [To Be Reborn, Part 4 (Final)]. YouTube (in Turkish). TRT Nostalji.
