= Exodus of Turks from Bulgaria (1950–1951) =

Expulsion by Bulgarian government

Exodus of Turks from the People's Republic of Bulgaria
- Location: Bulgaria, the Eastern Bloc
- Date: 1950–1951; 10 August – 7 October 1950 (First Wave) 2 December 1950 – 17 October (Second Wave)
- Victims: 154,393 Turks
- Perpetrator: Bulgarian Communist Government
- Motive: Anti-Turkish sentiment, Islamophobia, Bulgarian nationalism

During the Cold War in 1950–1951, hundreds of thousands of Turks left the territory of the People's Republic of Bulgaria. The expulsion was planned by the Bulgarian government before it began, and the reason was to secure its national borders and expel the Turkish population. Immigration of Pomaks was not allowed, as Bulgaria saw them as Muslim Bulgarians. The expulsion affected the economy of both countries, and according to some sources, it was caused because Turkey supported the US during the Korean War. An unknown number of Muslim Roma also wanted to leave Bulgaria, but Turkey did not allow them to cross the border. Although the Bulgarian government's first plan was to expel at least 250,000 Turks, they failed, and only 154,393 Turks left the country, which equaled 3% of the country's entire population. The reason for the end of the exodus was that Turkey closed its borders, as Bulgaria was giving visas not only to Turks, but also to people of Roma origin, and – according to Turkey – secret agents as well. American historian Mary C. Neuburger described the exodus as "hurried, unorganized, and destructive both for the Turkish community and the Bulgarian economy."

== Background ==
Bulgaria gained independence from the Ottoman Empire in 1878 with the Treaty of San Stefano. The Turks were between fifth and quarter of the population, which made them a minority. The rights of the Turkish minority, as well as the Muslim minority was protected with the Treaty of Berlin, which gave basic rights like freedom of worship. Later the Turnovo Constitution of 1879 and the Bulgarian-Ottoman Convention of 1909 also protected and guaranteed the rights of the Muslim minority. However, the Bulgarian government never paid attention to the education and economic situation of minorities in the country. For example, education in Turkish was tolerated, but these schools did not receive any support from the government, unlike their Bulgarian counterparts. This caused a very low level of education among the Turkish minority, and there was no way for them to participate in politics. Religious education was not only allowed, but also encouraged to prevent the minority from integrating into the new society.

The situation of the Turkish minority worsened especially after 1934. Examples of this were the incident in Razgrad, the pogrom in Kesarevo and the renaming of villages in 1934. A report from 1934 states: "we cannot have the illusion that we will ever melt the Turks living in the country and make them Bulgarians [...] we should do everything possible to keep the Turks in ignorance, to keep their cultural level as low as possible, and not to allow them to get firmly on their feet materially and economically." Since the assimilation campaign was rejected in the 1930s, the idea of emigration was launched, which the Bulgarian state did not give up until 1989.

== Communist Bulgaria ==
After WWII, Bulgaria became a communist country, and its opinion of Turkey changed since Turkey was not part of the Eastern Bloc. Georgi Dimitrov wanted to give rights to all the minorities in the country, but he was of the opinion that one must be careful with the Turks, in order not to create a Turkish influence on communist Bulgaria. Since the two neighboring countries belonged to rival blocs, migration was banned.

=== 1947 ===
As Turkey and Bulgaria were under rival political systems, the borders were closed and emigration was practically impossible. A commission created in 1947 toured various Turkish settlements and concluded that the Turks would never be loyal and that there was no point in stopping them if they wanted to emigrate. According to Georgi Dimitrov:

"I have to tell you, let it remain between us, that there is one big issue that has not existed since yesterday, it is that on our southern border we have, in fact, a non-Bulgarian population, which represents a permanent ulcer for our country. Before us, as a party and government, is the question of finding a way to remove it from there and settle it in another place, and to settle our own Bulgarian population there... We cannot leave the People's Republic of Bulgaria in such a situation as it existed on September 9".

=== 1949 ===
Actions for emigration began in 1949, when the expulsion of the Turks was associated with national security. Although the state wanted the Turks to leave, this did not apply to the Pomaks – according to the Bulgarian authorities, they were of Bulgarian origin and they had to stay in their homeland.

After the death of Georgi Dimitrov in 1949, an inquiry was made to the Soviet Union and Stalin, and a decision was made to expel 30–40% of the Turkish population of the country. The reason given was that the Turks would never be integrated as they had no faith in the government, also they were a hostile group, and had direct ties to capitalist Turkey. Particular attention was paid to the Turks living in the Rhodopes, near the Turkish border. Apart from the fact that the Bulgarian government was looking for people to replace the Turks in the tobacco industry flourishing in the region, it was also believed that their expulsion would eventually protect the southern Bulgarian border. Depending on the Turkish reaction, two options were indicated: if Turkey agrees to accept a mass exodus, it should be carried out and Bulgarians would settle in the places of the Turks who left, and if Turkey refuses – there should be internal deportation.

Bulgarian politicians were of the opinion that although Turkey would want the emigration of Turks from Bulgaria, she would not be able to accommodate a large scale mass emigration, and this would create a negative effect on Turkey's image as a capitalist country and the capitalist West in general. Also, Turkey experienced severe unemployment and financial crisis at that time, and was not as economically strong as most other countries of the West.

=== 1950 ===
After the Bulgarian retake of Southern Dobruja, the percentage of the Turkish population increased significantly, as many Turks lived in the area itself, in addition to Bulgarians. The opinion about emigration of the Turks did not change, but one more reason for exodus was added: the large number of Turks in Bulgaria. At the beginning of 1950, the Bulgarian government began to forcibly seize the lands of the Turks, especially in the North-Eastern part of the country - Dobruja and Deliorman. However, attention was paid to the financial implications of a possible merger. The argument that Bulgaria "will give 100,000 manpower and soldiers to Turkey" began to emerge, but on the other hand it was argued that the Turkish government would not be able to take many people. However, Celal Bayar maintained that no matter how many emigrants came, Turkey would accept all of them. Adnan Menderes was also of the opinion that in the short term this may have a negative impact on the Turkish economy, but in the long term it would have a positive impact and he gave Greek-Turkish population exchange as an example.

== Exodus ==
=== First wave ===
On 10 August 1950, Bulgaria sent a note to Turkey to accept 250,000 Turks within three months. Turkey quickly rejected this note, claiming that it was impossible to accept so many people in such a short period of time. However, Bulgaria began to issue passports to those wishing to leave, and Turkey was very slow in approving refugees; in fact Sofia willingly gave passports to everyone who wished to emigrate, but Ankara refused to accept those with a passport and wanted visas. Such a large displacement of population was considered to be a violation of the Ankara Agreement 1925, according to which all migrants had the right to take with them all their moveable property and savings.

The Kapıkule-Edirne road was being run on foot by the immigrants brought to the border by the Bulgarians with military trucks. The number of immigrants coming to Turkey was increasing day by day. Turkey was not well prepared to accommodate such a large number of refugees, yet the reaction was fast: Kızılay established 50-bed hospitals in Çorlu and Edirne, Edirne Migrant House admitted 1000 people under poor conditions despite its 360-person capacity. Some of the refugees were accommodated at the Karaağaç Guest House since it had sufficient shelter. Houses in Tekirdağ, Sirkeci and Tuzla were repaired, in Mudanya refugees were settled in the station buildings, farms belonging to the state in Dalaman and Koçarteke were given to the immigrant Turks from Bulgaria. The Ministry of Agriculture also offered financial support. The Council of Ministers sent an instruction to governors, and an aid committee was requested to act in a planned manner in the care and accommodation of Turks migrating from Bulgaria.

At the time, while Turkey was accommodating refugees, the two countries exchanged notes and blamed each other: Bulgaria claimed that Turkey was not treating immigrants well, and Turkey claimed that Bulgaria was asking for the impossible by wanting to send 250,000 Turks within three months.

At that time, Bulgaria began giving visas or fake visas to Muslim Roma people as well. However, according to the Turkish constitution, only persons of Turkish origin could immigrate to the country, and Roma people in Bulgaria were not of Turkish origin. They were considered "useless" by Bulgaria, who tried to get rid of them. Turkey also had suspicions that together with the Turkish refugees there were also Bulgarian spies among them. All these made Turkey close its borders on 7 October 1950. Ankara protested to the United Nations and the Council of Europe, but these bodies did not take any further actions. Refugees waiting for the border to reopen again began to lead demonstrations. As thousands of refugees were waiting at the border, the Bulgarian Red Cross was forced to send aid and provide shelter.

==== Roma people ====
The Roma people and suspicions of Bulgarian agents became the reason for Turkey to close its borders. A decision was made to send them back to Bulgaria, and those who had not yet crossed the border were not allowed to enter Turkey. But not long after, Bulgaria granted Roma people the right to return within 48 hours. On 1 October, Celal Bayar made a statement that if Bulgaria continued with the same policy, the case would be brought to the UN, and if Bulgaria stopped sending Roma people, Turkey would open its borders again. This statement by Bayar caused the Bulgarian authorities to soften their positions, and on 2 December 1950, the border was opened again. The fact that Turkey then supported the US during the Korean War relatively helped to enforce its opinion.

=== Second wave ===
Turkey was comparatively better prepared for the second wave, although it also had to deal with the emigration of Turks from other countries: Yemen, Pakistan, Jordan, India, Turkestan, Yugoslavia, etc. However, due to suspicions that Sofia was again giving visas to Roma people, Turkey closed its borders again. Both countries blamed each other: Turkey accused Sofia of issuing fake visas and Sofia accused Ankara of forging them. On the other hand, Bulgaria's economy began to focus even more on agriculture, which made the Turks an important economic factor, in that 83% of the refugees were farmers, foresters, fishermen, and hunters. Bulgaria also supported the communist movement in Korea, and Ankara captured 126 Bulgarian spies. In this way, the Bulgarian-Turkish border was once again closed on 17 October 1951.

== Forced resettlement of Pomaks ==
The forced resettlement of the Pomaks during the communist era in Bulgaria has its roots before 1950. For example, in 1948, 2,319 Pomaks from the Rhodopes were resettled in Northeastern Bulgaria. During the resettlement, one person was injured by the soldiers and another killed. In 1951, many Pomak families from Nevrokop were deported to places where the Turks traditionally lived. They were housed in the houses Turks left behind during the exodus.

== Treatment of refugees ==
=== Bulgaria ===
The refugees were given 15 days to sell all their belongings. Many of them failed to do so. Refugees boarded different trains and their belongings were placed on others – leaving many Turks without their most important belongings while waiting to cross the border. Also, they paid fees to have their belongings brought to them at the border. Although they had the right to take their animals and property with them, that right was taken away. All groups in the different settlements were given a total of 20 minutes to board the train to travel to the border. Due to the failure of Bulgaria to send 800 migrants per day, various diseases have appeared among many Bulgarian Turks.

=== Turkey ===
The refugees were accommodated in Thrace and then in the settlements where they were supposed to live. Turkey chose their residence and gave preference to the East and South-East regions as they did not have much population and ethnic Turks were a minority there. Thrace was also an important place because the population density was low and it was a frontier region. Then came the Aegean and Mediterranean regions, and finally Central and Western Anatolia.

Many of them were allocated to places where there was a strong need for the given refugee's occupation. For example, gardeners were mostly directed to Antalya, and those involved in arts to Istanbul. The Turks who were engaged in tobacco production in Bulgaria were directed to Konya and Eskişehir, and those who knew how to cultivate the land were placed in regions where cotton was produced.

The personal belongings, goods and animals of the immigrants were exempted from all customs duties for a one time only. Farmers' farm animals up to 6,000 liras, cars and all kinds of agricultural vehicles were excluded from the tax, and tradesmen and self-employed people also benefited from the same practice. The tax exemption rate for traders was determined as 12,000 liras, and official taxes on passports, visas, population, transportation, title deeds and stamps were not collected from these immigrants. While the settlers did not pay building and land tax for five years, male immigrants over the age of 22 were also exempted from military service.

Various organizations and intellectuals took part in collecting funds for the refugees. In various places, new districts and settlements were created, intended only for the Turks from Bulgaria.

== Terminology ==
Bulgarian reports used the term izselvane [изселване], meaning exodus, and a report from August 1949 called it izgonvane [изгонване], meaning to expel.

== Cultural autonomy ==
The process of de-Stalinisation gave more freedom to Bulgarian politicians who for the next 25 years tried to integrate and finally assimilate the Turkish minority. Their goal was to make the Turks part of the Bulgarian communist nation. According to Veselin Dimitrov: "since the process [of integration] was based on unequal terms, the implicit assumption being that the Turks would be expected to merge into an already existing Bulgarian national identity, it can best be described as assimilation rather than integration, regardless of the official terminology used." Efforts to raise the standard of the Turks were made. Since Turks were active in the agricultural labour force, soon they became an important part of the Bulgarian economy. The younger generation spoke Bulgarian better but this did not make them abandon using Turkish at home.

The communist propaganda described the Turks as "equal participants in building a glorious socialist state". Their accomplishments were highlighted. The idea of another expulsion was not completely rejected, but it was now viewed in a different way: Turks played a role in the country's economy. However beneath these changes lay the motive to assimilate the Turkish minority into the Bulgarian majority.

However, similar ideas led to another emigration between 1968–78, and finally the official assimilation campaign of the Turkish minority in 1984.

== See also ==
- Big Excursion
- Revival Process
- Komotini pogrom
- Recep Küpçü
