= Bunovo =

Village in Bulgaria

Bunovo, Bulgaria
- Village
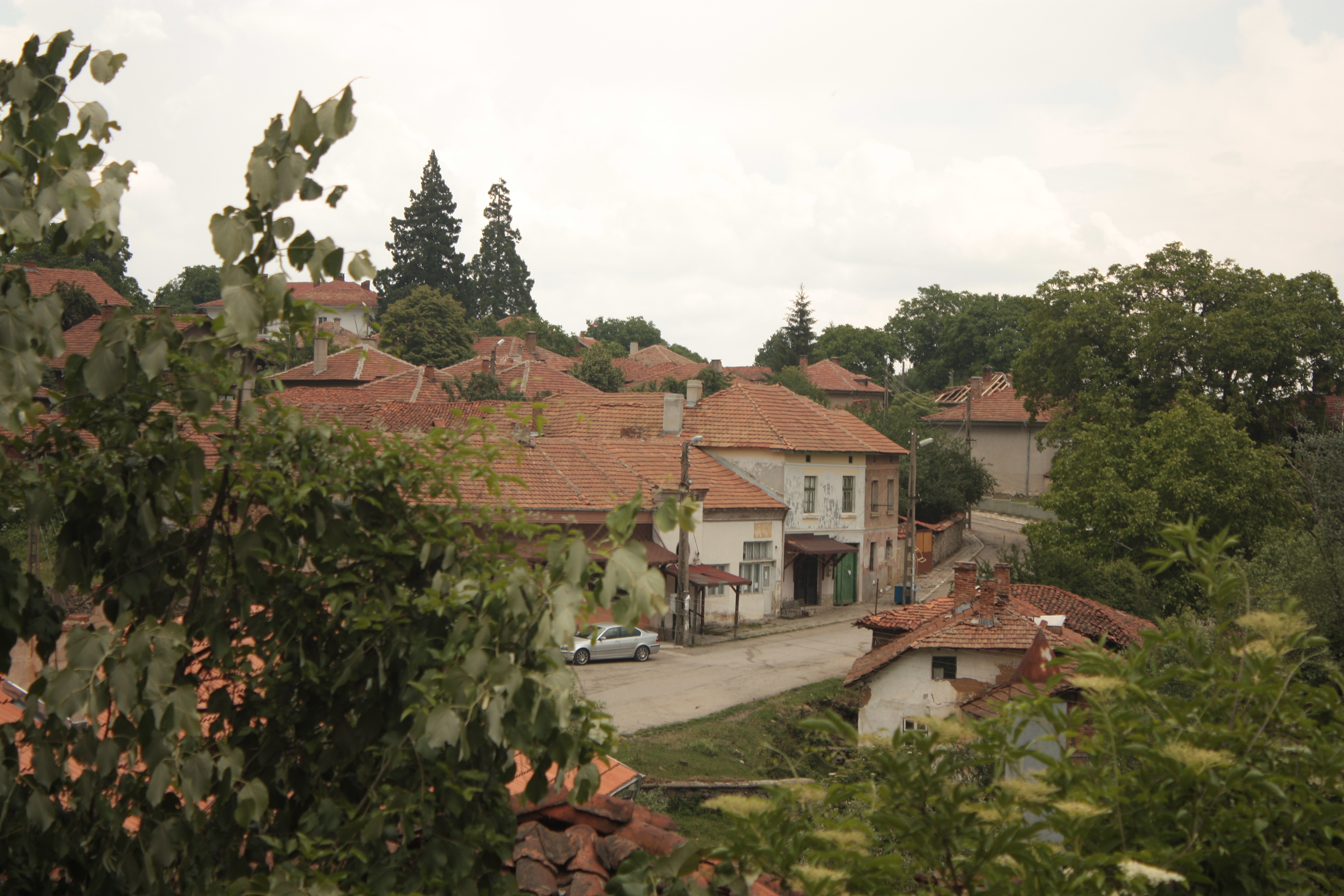
- Bunovo, Bulgaria

- Location within Bulgaria
- Coordinates: 42.717°N 23.933°E
- Country: Bulgaria
- Village: Sofia Region

Area
  - Total: 49.711 km^{2} (19.194 sq mi)
- Elevation: 750 m (2,460 ft)
- Time zone: UTC+3 (UTC+03:00)
- Postal code: 2074
- Area code: 07187

Bunovo (Note: Bulgarian: Буново) is a village in western Bulgaria. It is located in the Mirkovo Municipality of the province of Sofia.

== History ==
The people of the village of Bunovo were among the first Bulgarians to engage in the national liberation movement associated with the revolutionary Vasil Levski. The Bunovo revolutionary committee's representative, Alipiy Petkov was one of the participants in the Grand National Assembly in Oborishte in 1876.

On March 9, 1985, Bulgarian citizens with Turkish identity blew up a carriage for mothers with children near the train station in Bunovo. Three children and four women died.

== Landmarks ==
The Vasil Levski Memorial Complex was opened in 2007 near the Galabets Pass near Bunovo. The complex features a bust of Vasil Levski along with carvings of Georgi Benkovski and Panayot Volov.

== Bibliography ==
- "Буново" [Bunovo]. Община Мирково (in Bulgarian). Община Мирково.
- "Мемориален комплекс Васил Левски, село Буново, България" [Vasil Levski Memorial Complex, Bunovo village, Bulgaria]. RILA.WS (in Bulgarian). August 20, 2021.
