= Tomasz Kamusella =

Polish academic (born 1967)

Tomasz Kamusella FRHistS
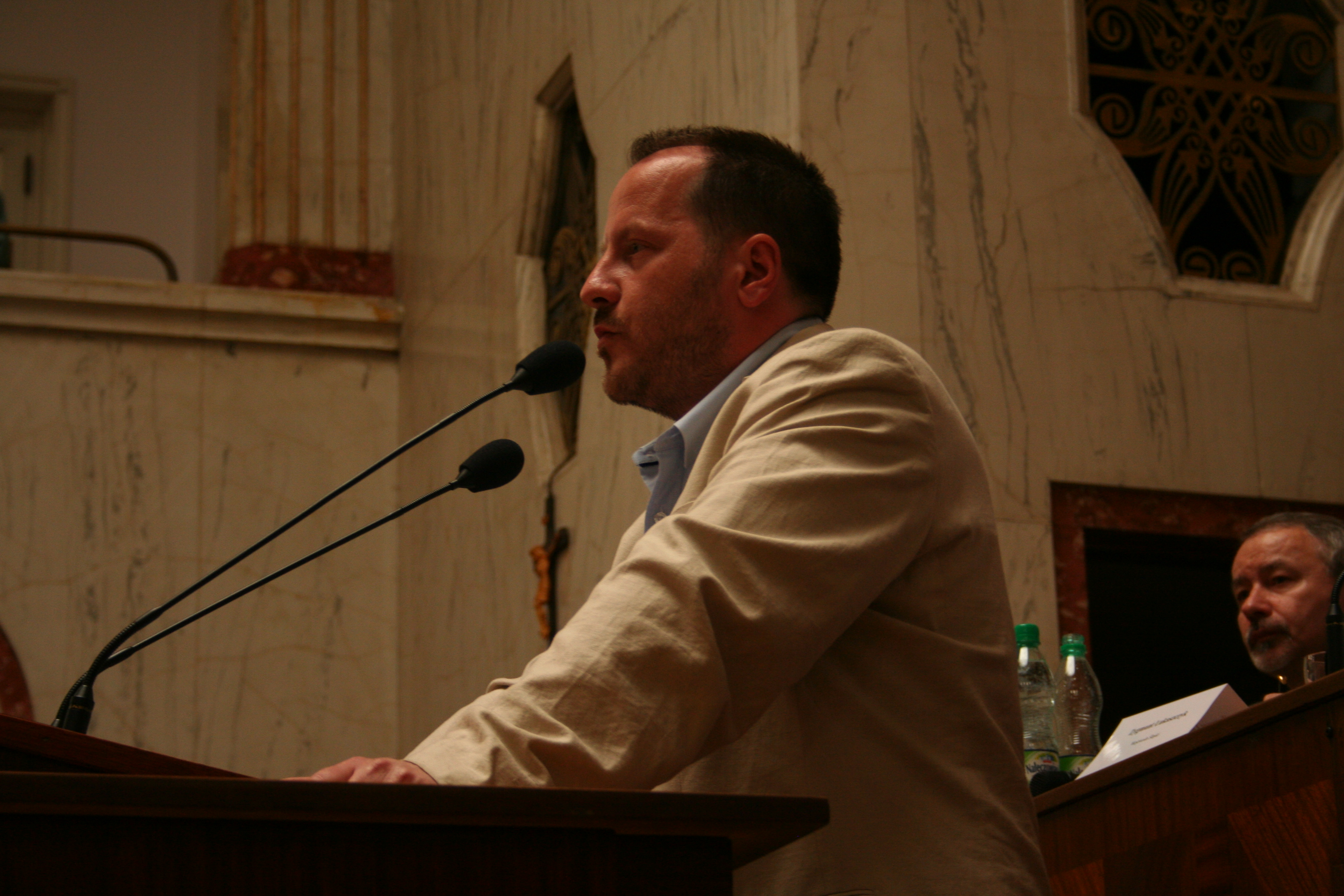
- Kamusella speaking at the First Codification Conference of the Silesian Language in June 2008
- Born: Tomasz Dominik Kamuzela; 24 December 1967 (age 58); Kędzierzyn, Opole Voivodeship, Poland

Academic background
- Education: University of Silesia in Katowice

Academic work
- Sub-discipline: Language Politics, Nationalism Studies, History of Central and Eastern Europe
- Institutions: University of St Andrews
- Website: Tom Kamusella publications on Academia.edu

Tomasz Kamusella FRHistS (born 24 December 1967) is a Polish scholar pursuing interdisciplinary research in language politics, nationalism, and ethnicity.

== Education ==
Kamusella was educated in the Faculty of Philology in Sosnowiec Campus (English language) at the University of Silesia in Katowice, Poland; Potchefstroom University (now part of the North-West University) in Potchefstroom, South Africa; and the Central European University (co-accredited then by the Open University, Milton Keynes, United Kingdom), Prague Campus, Czech Republic. He obtained his doctoral degree in political science from the Western Institute, Poznań, Poland and habilitation in Cultural Studies from the Warsaw School of Social Sciences and Humanities, Warsaw, Poland.

== Academic career ==
From 1994 to 1995, he taught in the Language Teachers' Training College (Nauczycielskie Kolegium Języków Obcych), Opole, Poland, and between 1995 and 2007 at the University of Opole, Opole, Poland. From 2002 to 2006, he did postdoctoral research in the European University Institute, Florence, Italy; the John W. Kluge Center, Library of Congress, Washington, DC, United States; the Institute for Human Sciences (Institut für die Wissenschaften vom Menschen, IWM), Vienna, Austria; and the Herder-Institut (de), Marburg, Germany. As visiting professor, in 2007 to 2010, he taught Central and Eastern European History and Polish History and Politics in Trinity College, Dublin, Ireland, in 2010–11 at the Kraków University of Economics, Kraków, Poland; and in 2011 did research in the Slavic Research Center, Hokkaido University, Sapporo, Japan. Since then, he has been teaching in the School of History (Centre for Transnational and Spatial History) at the University of St Andrews, St Andrews, Fife, Scotland.

== Civil servant ==
In 1996, he was employed as the Plenipotentiary on European Integration to the Regional Governor (Pełnomocnik Wojewody ds. Integracji Europejskiej) in the Regional Authority (Urząd Wojewódzki) of Opole. Later, from 1999 to 2002, he acted as Advisor on International Affairs to the Regional President (Doradca Marszałka ds. Współpracy z Zagranicą), Self-Governmental Regional Authority (Urząd Marszałkowski), Opole. In co-operation with the University of Opole, between 1997 and 2001, he managed the application in the European Commission, and financing that led to the establishment of the European Documentation Center in Opole. Thanks to his 1998 official European Union Visitors Program visit to the Spanish Autonomous Community of Galicia, in 1999 a co-operation agreement was signed between this Spanish region and Opole Region.

== Books ==
=== Authored books in English ===
- A Dictionary of English Homophones with Explanations in Polish. 1992. Potchefstroom: Potchefstroom University and Katowice: Uniwersytet Slaski, 180pp.
- The Dynamics of the Policies of Ethnic Cleansing in Silesia During the Nineteenth and Twentieth Centuries. 2000. Prague: Research Support Scheme, 710pp.
- Silesia and Central European Nationalisms: The Emergence of National and Ethnic Groups in Prussian Silesia and Austrian Silesia, 1848–1918. 2007. West Lafayette, IN: Purdue University Press, 386 pp. ISBN 978-1-55753-371-5.
- The Politics of Language and Nationalism in Modern Central Europe. 2009. Basingstoke, UK: Palgrave Macmillan, 1168 pp. ISBN 9780230583474.
- Creating Languages in Central Europe During the Last Millennium. 2015. Basingstoke: Palgrave Pivot, 168 pp.; ISBN 9781137507839.
- The Un-Polish Poland, 1989 and the Illusion of Regained Historical Continuity. 2017. Basingstoke: Palgrave Pivot, 162 pp.; ISBN 9783319600352.
- Ethnic Cleansing During the Cold War: The Forgotten 1989 Expulsion of Turks from Communist Bulgaria (Ser: Routledge Studies in Modern European History). 2018. London: Routledge, 328pp. ISBN 9781138480520.
- Limits / Styknie (bilingual, English-Silesian edition of short stories, translated from the English by Marcin Melon). 2019. (Ser: Ślōnski druk. Modernŏ literatura pō naszymu). Kotōrz Mały: Silesia Progress. ISBN 9788365558282, 324pp.
- (with Asnake Kefale and Christopher Van der Beken) Eurasian Empires as Blueprints for Ethiopia: From Ethnolinguistic Nation-State to Multiethnic Federation. 2021. London: Routledge, 162pp. ISBN 9781003158097 doi:10.4324/9781003158097
- Politics and the Slavic Languages. 2021. London: Routledge, 350 pp. ISBN 9780367569846 doi:10.4324/9781003100188
- Words in Space and Time: A Historical Atlas of Language Politics in Modern Central Europe. 2021. Budapest and New York: CEU Press, 310pp & 42 full color maps. ISBN 9789633864173

=== Edited volumes in English ===
- (edited with Wojciech Burszta and Sebastian Wojciechowski) Nationalisms Across the Globe: An Overview of Nationalisms in State-Endowed and Stateless Nations (Vol 1: Europe). 2005. Poznań: Wyższa Szkoła Nauk Humanistycznych i Dziennikarstwa, 502pp. ISBN 83-87653-51-9, ISBN 83-87653-41-1
- (edited with Wojciech Burszta and Sebastian Wojciechowski) Nationalisms Across the Globe: An Overview of Nationalisms in State-Endowed and Stateless Nations (Vol. 2: The World). 2006. Poznań: Wyższa Szkoła Nauk Humanistycznych i Dziennikarstwa, 558pp. ISBN 83-87653-51-9, ISBN 83-87653-41-1
- (edited with Krzysztof Jaskułowski) Nationalisms Today. 2009. Oxford: Peter Lang. 334pp. ISBN 9783039118830
- (edited with Motoki Nomachi) The Multilingual Society of Vojvodina: Intersecting Borders, Cultures and Identities. 2014. Sapporo: Slavic Research Center, Hokkaido University. ISBN 9784938637781.
- (edited with James Bjork, Tim Wilson and Anna Novikov) Creating Nationality in Central Europe, 1880–1950: Modernity, Violence and (Be)longing in Upper Silesia (Ser: Routledge Studies in the History of Russia and Eastern Europe, Vol 25). 2016. London: Routledge, 252pp. ISBN 9780415835961.
- (edited with Motoki Nomachi and Catherine Gibson) The Palgrave Handbook of Slavic Languages, Identities and Borders. 2016. Basingstoke: Palgrave, 582pp. ISBN 9781137348388
- (edited with Motoki Nomachi and Catherine Gibson). Central Europe Through the Lens of Language and Politics: On the Sample Maps from the Atlas of Language Politics in Modern Central Europe (Ser: Slavic Eurasia Papers, Vol 10). 2017. Sapporo: Slavic-Eurasian Research Center, Hokkaido University, 111pp +10 maps. ISBN 9784938637910
- (edited with Finex Ndhlovu) The Social and Political History of Southern Africa's Languages. 2018. London: Palgrave Macmillan, 412pp. ISBN 9781137015921 doi:10.1057/978-1-137-01593-8

=== Books in Polish ===
- W bżuhu vieloryba [In a Whale's Belly, a collection of essays on nationalism and language politics in Asia, the Balkans and Central Europe. Introduction by Prof Wojciech J Burszta]. 2006. Toruń, Poland: Wydawnictwo A Marszałek, 305 pp. ISBN 978-83-7441-383-1.
