= Anatolian Bulgarians =

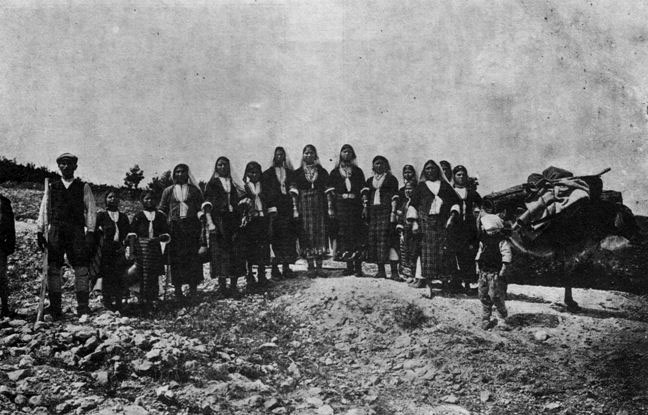
Anatolian Bulgarian refugees from Çataltepe in Bulgaria in 1914

The Anatolian Bulgarians or Bulgarians of Asia Minor (Bulgarian: малоазийски българи, maloazijski bǎlgari, or shortly, малоазианци, maloazianci) were members of the Bulgarian Orthodox Church who settled in Ottoman-ruled northwestern Anatolia (today in Turkey), possibly in the 18th century, and remained there until 1914.

The main area of settlement lay to the south of the Sea of Marmara between Çanakkale, Balıkesir and Bursa. There was a village named Bulgarlar, now called Hamidiye, near Mihaliç (today Karacabey), settled in the 18th century by Bulgarians.

The existence of Bulgarian villages in Anatolia was noted by western travellers such as the Italian Dr Salvatori (1807), the Frenchman J.M. Tancoigne and the Briton George Keppel (1829). Tancoigne describes his experience in Kız-Dervent (located farther east, between İzmit and İznik) as follows:

We were pleasantly surprised by finding in that village women who would walk with their faces uncovered, and men whose manners contradicted the Asian ones entirely. We also discovered dresses of the residents of the Danube's banks and heard a Slavic language in an area where we would regard it as absolutely foreign ... The locals told us they were of Bulgarian origin and their village had been founded almost a century ago by their fathers ... The residents of that village are Christians Orthodox.

The Bulgarian presence in northwestern Anatolia was studied in more detail by the ethnographer Vasil Kanchov who visited the area in the late 19th century. According to his data, there were 20 Bulgarian villages in Anatolia, for each of which he provided the number of Bulgarian houses. In Kız-Dervent, there were 400 Bulgarian houses, in Kocabunar — 350, in Söğüt — 60, in Kubaş — 100, in Toybelen — 50, in Yeniköy (Ново село, Novo selo) — 150, in Mandır — 150, in Alacabayır — 50, in Killik (also Ikinlik) — 50, in Simavla — 40, in Hacıpaunköy — 80, in Manata — 100, in Bayramiç — 30 (minority), in Stengelköy — 60, in Çataltaş (also Çataltepe) — 70, in Urumçe — 40, as well as an unknown number in Çaltık, Trama and Mata.

The 1897 research of L. Iv. Dorosiev, partially based on data by his brother Yakim, a tailor in Balıkesir, lists 16 Bulgarian-inhabited villages, as follows: Kocabunar — 245 houses with 1,485 people, Söğüt — 65 houses with 440 people, Novo selo (also Yeniköy, Kızılcılar) — 65 houses with 425 people, Killik — 35 houses with 212 people, Toybelen — 125 houses with 712 people, Alacabair — 55 houses with 308 people, Taşkesi — 35 houses with 252 people, Mandır — 145 houses with 940 people, Hacıpaunköy — 60 houses with 344 people, Üren — 15 houses with 95 people, Kubaş — 20 houses with 115 people, Stengelköy — 55 houses with 312 people, Çataltepe — 80 houses, Urumçe — 45 houses, Yeniköy — 35 houses, as well as 50 houses in the town of Gönen. This makes a total of around 6,720 people.

After the Liberation of Bulgaria, many Anatolian Bulgarians returned to their native land, with some settling in Yagnilo and Dobroplodno, Varna Province, Svirachi, Oreshino, Byalopolyane, Ivaylovgrad in Haskovo Province exchanging their property with that of Turks from Bulgaria. In 1914, following the Balkan Wars, the vast majority of the Anatolian Bulgarians were deported to Bulgaria, leaving their property behind.

== See also ==
- Asia Minor Slavs
- Bulgarians in Turkey
- Serbs in Turkey
- Gallipoli Serbs
- Thracian Bulgarians
