= Ottoman genocide =

Ottoman genocide may refer to several topics:

- Any of the campaigns perpetrated mainly by the Committee of Union and Progress, who ruled the Ottoman Empire during the Second Balkan War and World War I:
  - Armenian genocide
  - 1915 genocide in Diyarbekir
  - Greek genocide
    - Pontic Greek genocide
  - Sayfo, or Assyrian genocide
  - Destruction of the Thracian Bulgarians in 1913
- Persecution of Muslims during the Ottoman contraction
- Late Ottoman genocides, a historiographical theory
