= Bulgarian Turks in Turkey =

български турци в Турция (Bulgarian); Türkiye'deki Bulgaristan Türkleri (Turkish)
- Born in Bulgaria: 372,000

Languages
- Turkish · Bulgarian

Religion
- Islam

Related ethnic groups
- Bulgarian Turks · Turks

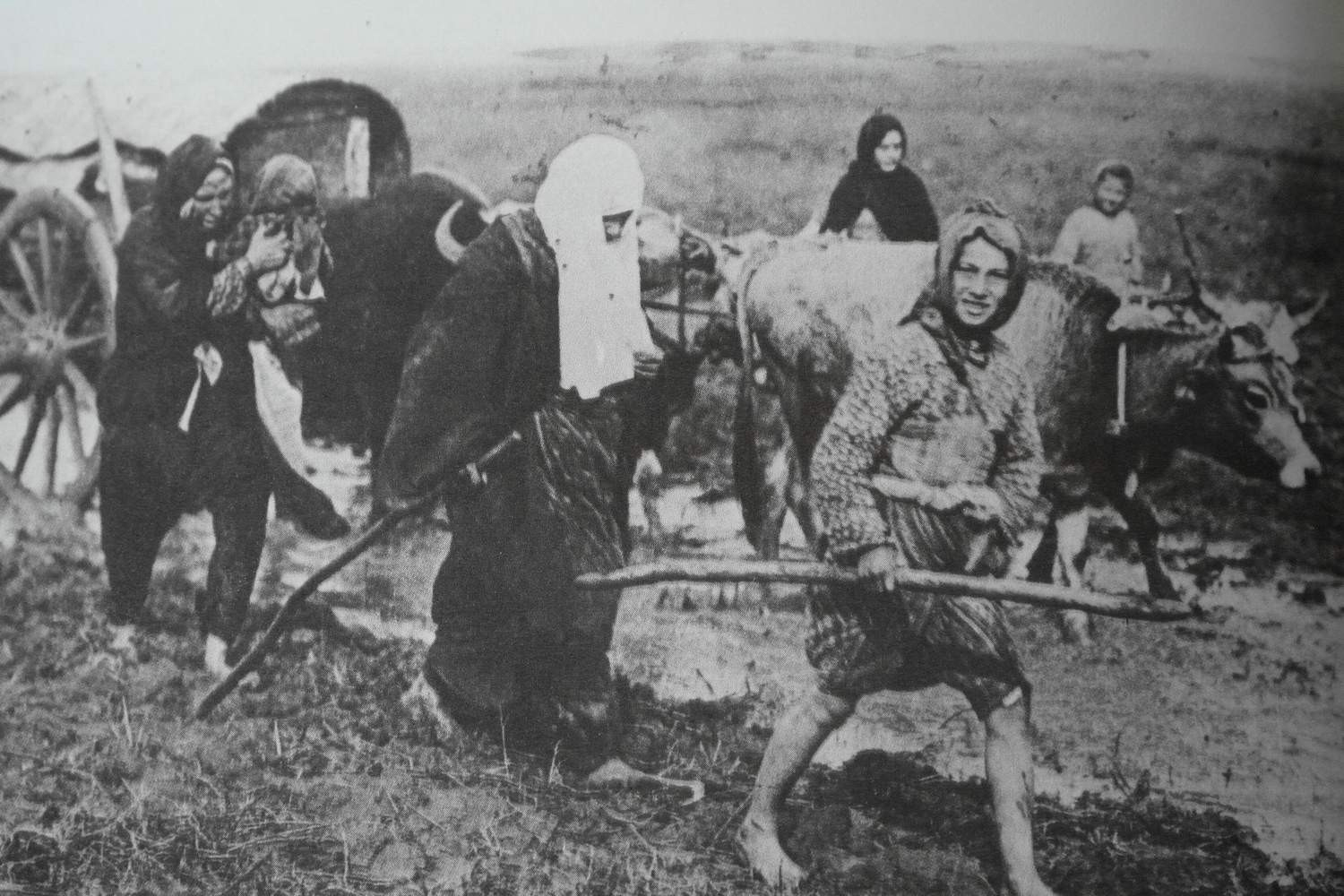
Turkish immigrants from Bulgaria arriving in Anatolia in 1912.

The Bulgarian Turks in Turkey represent a community of Bulgarian Turks who immigrated over the years from Bulgaria to Turkey. They are notable in Turkey for being descendants of Balkan Turks who had to escape persecution. And moreover, part of them continue to be dual citizens of Bulgaria and Turkey, which makes them a natural bridge between the two countries.

== Origins ==
Bulgarian Turks are descendants of Asian settlers who came across the narrows of the Dardanelles and the Bosporus following the Ottoman conquest of the Balkans in the late 14th and early 15th centuries, as well as Bulgarian converts to Islam who became Turkified during the centuries of Ottoman rule in Bulgaria. It has also been suggested that some Turks living today in Bulgaria may be direct ethnic descendants of earlier medieval Pecheneg, Oğuz, and Cuman Turkic tribes. The Turkish community became an ethnic minority when the Principality of Bulgaria was established after the Russo-Turkish War of 1877–1878.

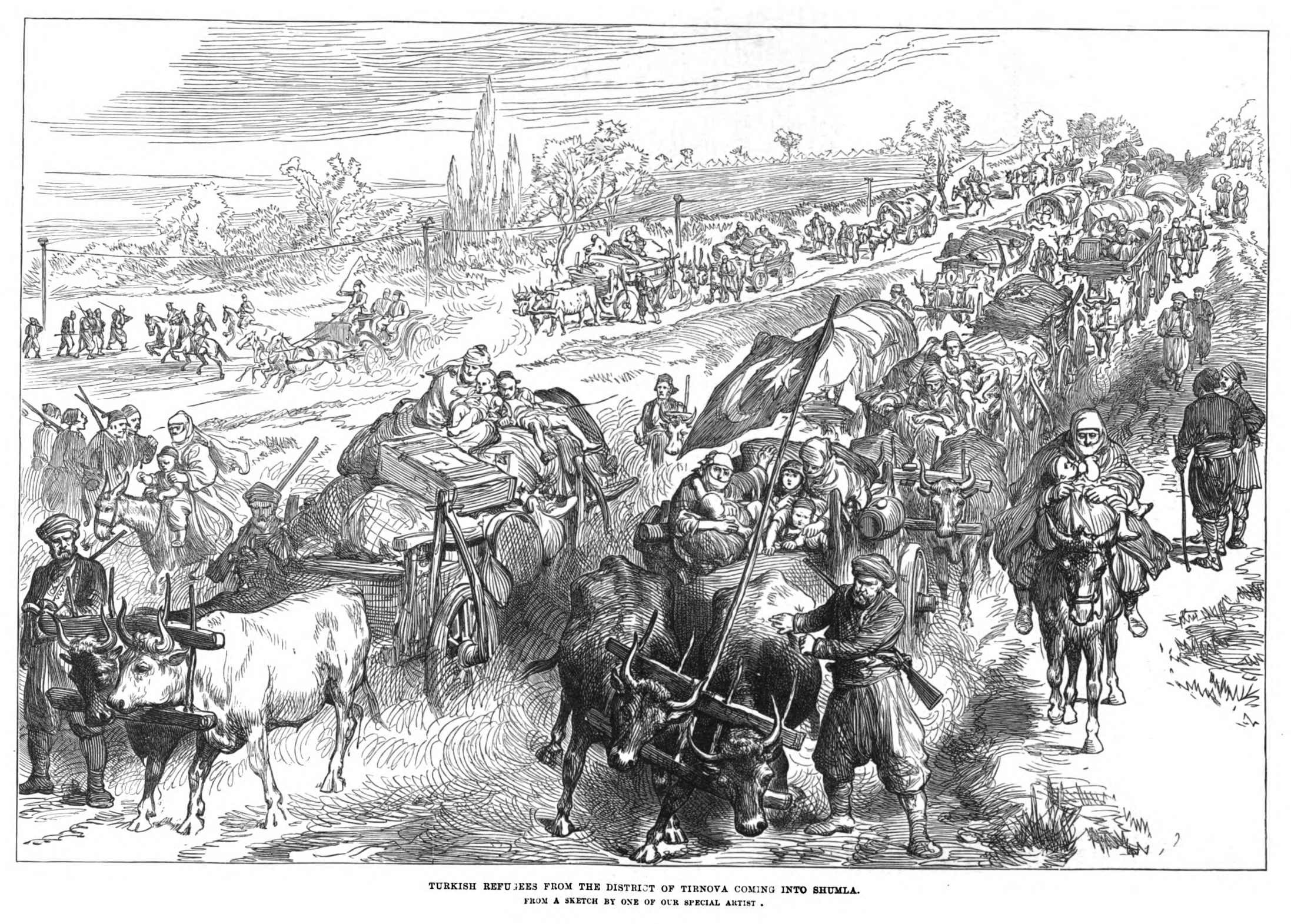
Turkish refugees from the Tirnova district coming into Shumla. The Illustrated London News 1 September 1877.

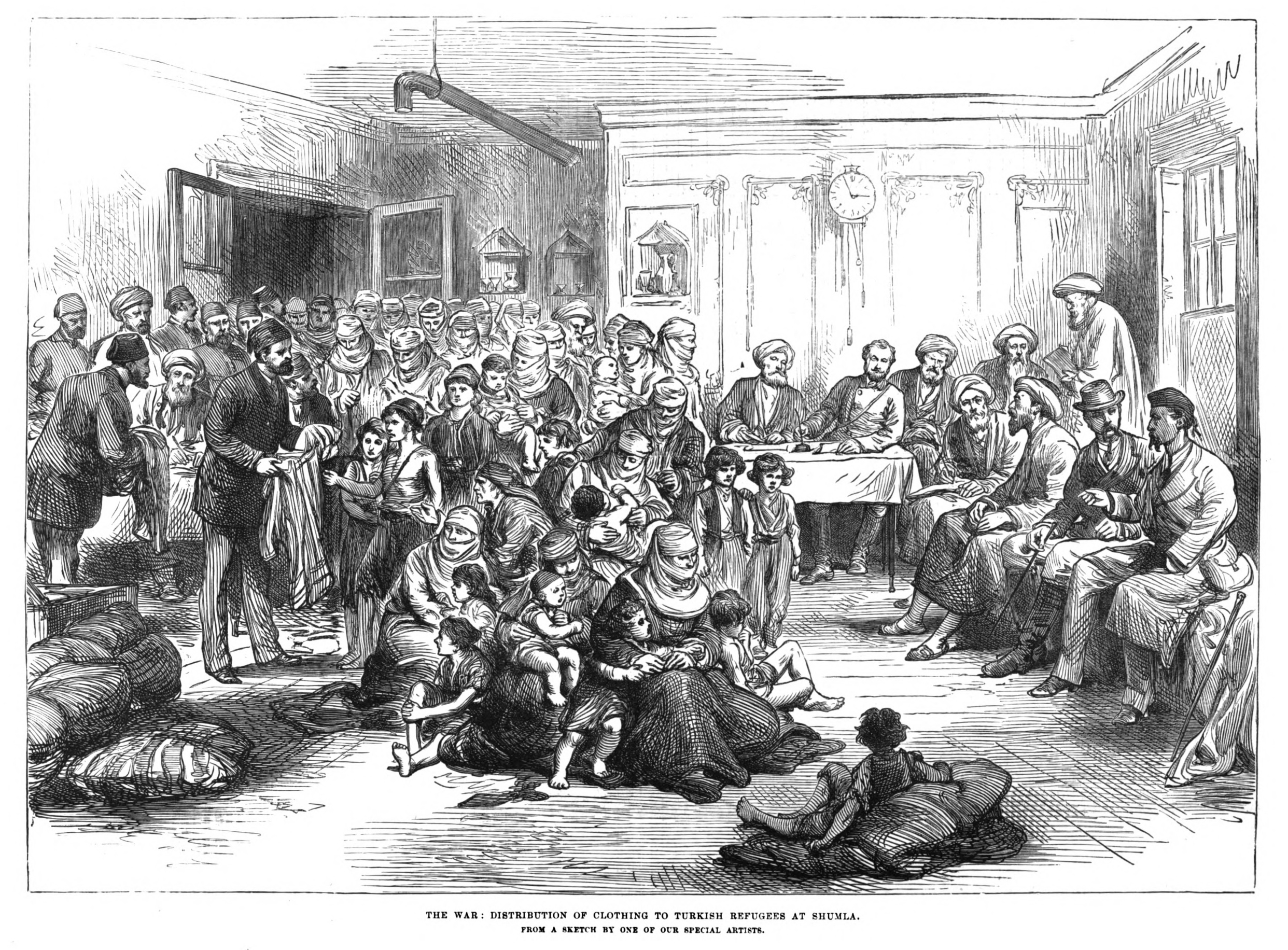
War Distribution Clothing Turkish Refugees Shumla. The Illustrated London News 17 November 1877.

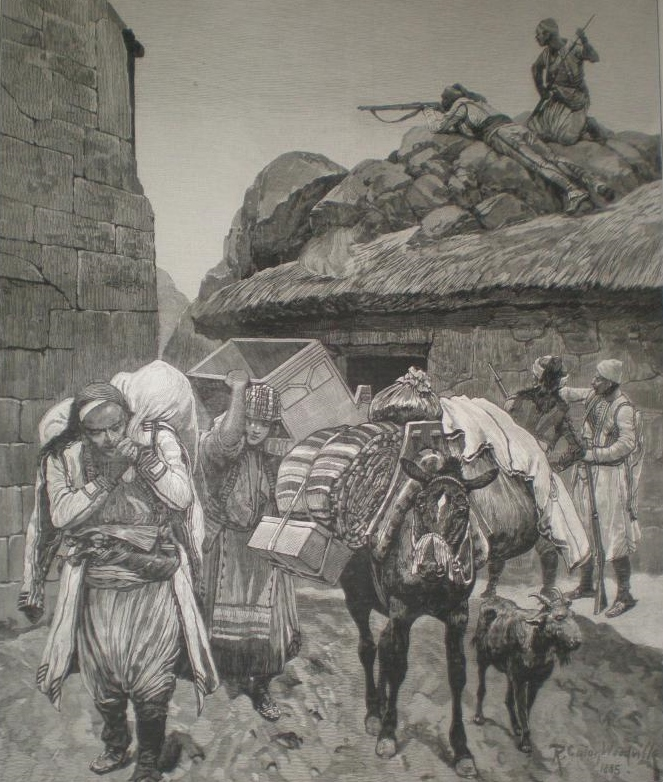
Turkish refugees from Eastern Rumelia in 1885. The Illustrated London News, author: Richard Caton Woodville, Jr.

== Notable Bulgarian Turks from Turkey ==
- Naim Süleymanoğlu
- Halil Mutlu
- Ahmet Fikri Tüzer
- Neriman Özsoy
- Yıldız İbrahimova
- Hakan Yıldız
- Hulusi Kentmen
- Şaziye Moral
- Ali Osman Sönmez
- Gülhan Şen
- Ciguli
- Şoray Uzun

== See also ==
- Turks in Bulgaria
- Crimean Tatars in Bulgaria
- Bulgarian Muslims
- Muslim Roma
- Roma in Bulgaria
- Bulgarian diaspora
- 1989 expulsion of Turks from Bulgaria
- Bulgaria–Turkey relations
