= Zerzevan Castle =

Archaeological site in Diyarbakır province, Turkey

- Zerzevan Kalesi
- Samachi Castle
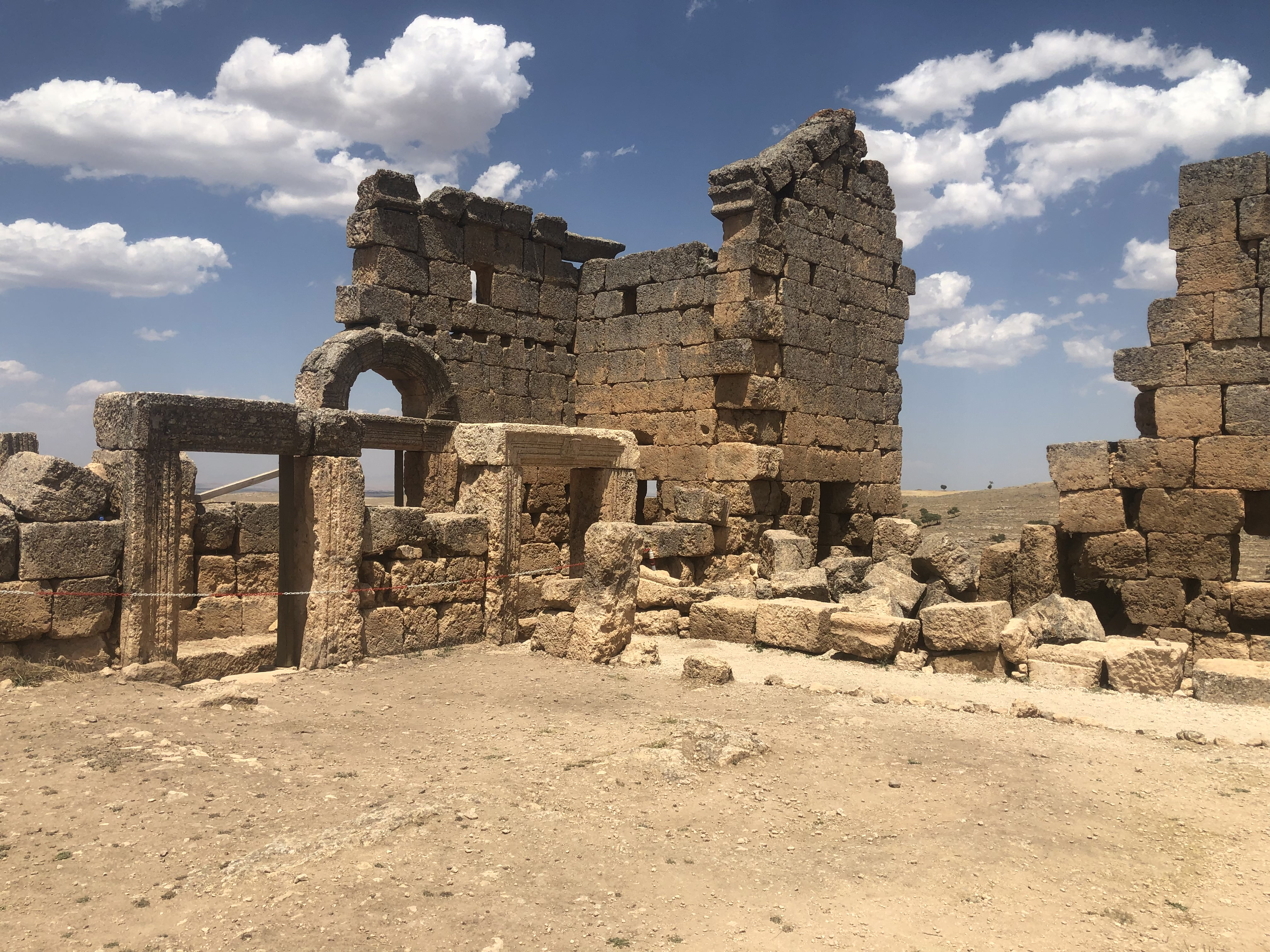
- Church ruins at North side of Zerzevan Castle (2021)

- Location of the castle in Turkey.
- 37°36′29″N 40°29′57″E
- Type: Fortification
- Periods: Early Christianity
- Location: Demirölçek, Çınar, Diyarbakır, Turkey

History
- Built: 4th century
- Built by: Eastern Roman Empire
- Abandoned: 7th century

Site notes
- Area: 57 daa (5.7 ha)
- Discovered: 2014
- Condition: Ruined
- Public access: Partial

Zerzevan Castle (Kurdish: Qesra Zêrzevan, Zîrzevan Turkish: Zerzevan Kalesi Armenian: Զերզեվանի ամրոց), also known as Samachi Castle, is a ruined Eastern Roman castle, a former important military base, in Diyarbakır Province, southeastern Turkey. Archaeological excavations at the site revealed the existence of underground structures, among them a temple of Mithraism, a mystery religion. The castle was used as a civilian settlement between the 1890s and the 1960s. The site is partly open to tourism.

== Etymology ==
Some travellers mention the name of this place as "Kasr Zerzaua" in 18th century while Evliya Celebi, an Ottoman traveller who lived in 17th century mentions in his Seyahatname (volume IV) about this place as "Zerzivan Valley" while travelling from Diyarbakir to Mardin. The name of Zerzevan derives from Kurdish word of "zêr" (gold) and it "is the changed form of Zerzaua mentioned by the travellers and it is the name given to the settlement while the village" was located in the same place. Zêr in Kurdish is Gold and Zîv is Silver (Gold and Silver), castle of gold and silver.

== Location ==
Zerzevan Castle was built in the 4th century by the Eastern Roman Empire as a military base on the ancient trade route between Diyarbakır and Mardin. It was in use until the 7th century. The castle is situated on the top of a 105–124 m (344–407 ft)-high rocky hill next to Demirölçek village about 13 km (8.1 mi) southeast of Çınar town in Diyarbakır Province on the highway D.950 to Mardin. It is located about 45 km (28 mi) from Diyarbakır.

== Archaeological works ==
The first archaeological excavations took place in the summer months of 2014. The works were initially carried out by a team of 35 led by an archaeologist from Dicle University, under the supervision of the Diyarbakır Archaeological Museum. In 2015, the size of the team working at the site increased to 60.

In 2020, archaeologists found the entrance of the castle.

In 2021, archaeologists discovered a flute with six holes and a bronze ring with a key which was used to open a chest. Both items dated back to the 4th and 5th centuries AD.

== History ==
The castle was an Eastern Roman military base and a strategic garrison settlement, dominating the entire valley and controlling the ancient road between Amida (now Diyarbakır) and Dara (now Mardin). The castle played a key role due to its location on the easternmost border protecting the Roman Empire. It marked the intersection and coalescence of the cultures in the west and the east.

The place was known as Samachi in classical antiquity. It was the site of heavy fighting between the Byzantine Empire and the Sasanian Empire. Jewelry found in the castle also indicates that the civilian population and military personnel resided together, with soldiers living alongside their family members. It was large enough to sustain a population of around one thousand.

Restoration and reconstruction works, which took place during the reigns of Eastern Roman emperors Anastasius I Dicorus (r. 491–518) and Justinian I (r. 527–565), saw the castle develop into its final state prior to its ruin. The castle was most likely in use until 639 with the arrival of Arab Muslims in the beginning of the Arab–Byzantine wars.

== Castle ==
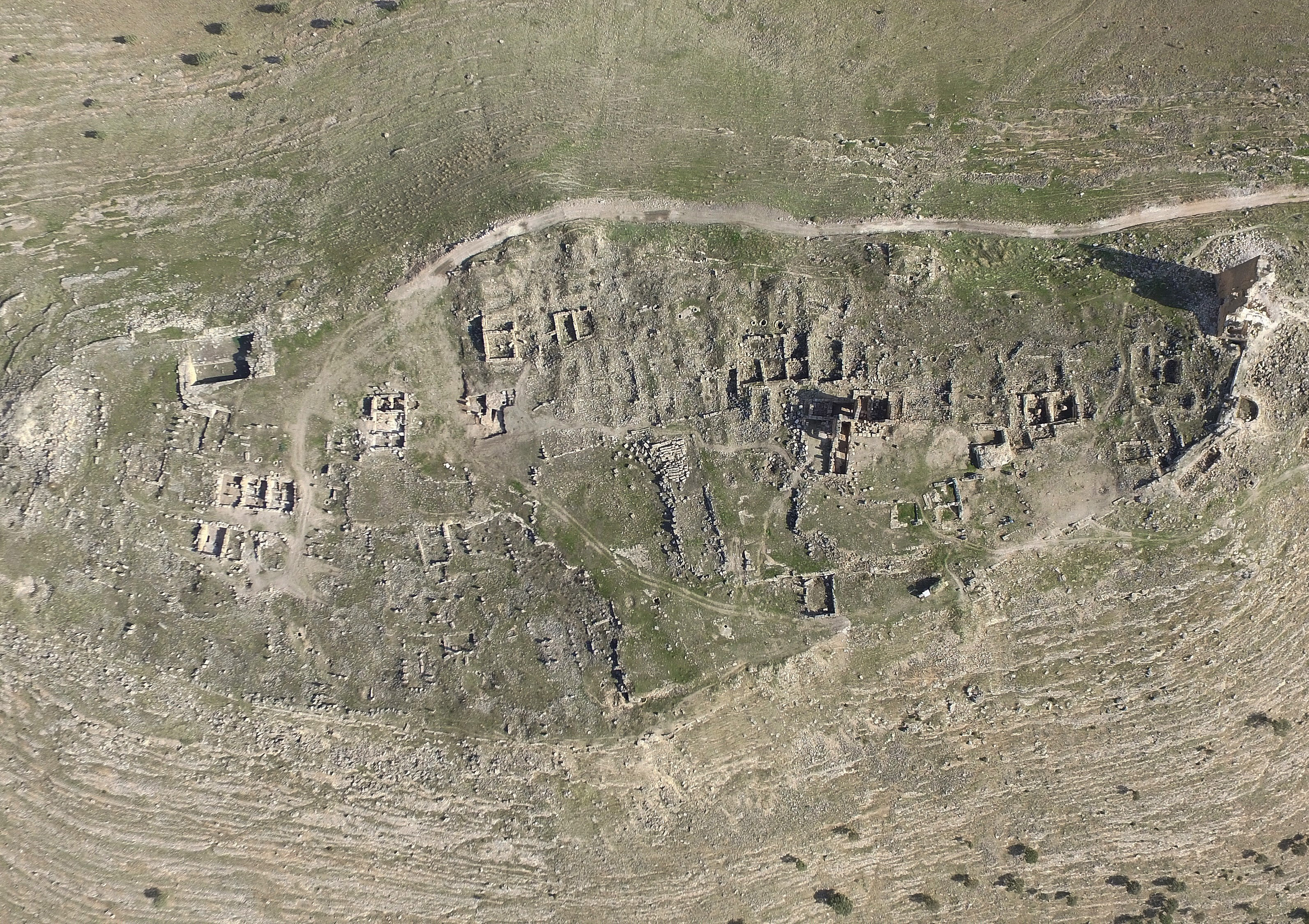
Aerial view of Zerzevan Castle (2016)

The castle stretches over an area of 5.7 ha (14 acres). The castle contains structures both above and below ground. Its ruined walls are 1,200 m (3,900 ft) long and 12 m (39 ft) high, and it has a 21–22 m (69–72 ft)-high watchtower. Inside the castle, there are ruins in a wide area and a rock-necropolis. In the north of the castle, which is at a lower elevation, residences and streets were erected while in the south public buildings were constructed on the higher terrain. A church building facing east–west remains one of the most well-conserved public buildings. Other public buildings include the palace, administrative building, baths, cereal storage, arsenal, and 54 cisterns. Military and medical material, jewelry, ornaments, and bronze coins were also found during the excavations. In 2016, a subterranean church and secret passageways were discovered. The discovered underground secret passageway was not in use for about 3,000 years and the subterranean church was closed around 1,500 years ago. A Mithraic underground temple and a subterranean sanctuary, able to hold 400 people, were also unearthed. In 2017, four more underground locations were discovered, where further excavation works are necessary to unearth them.

== Mithras Temple ==
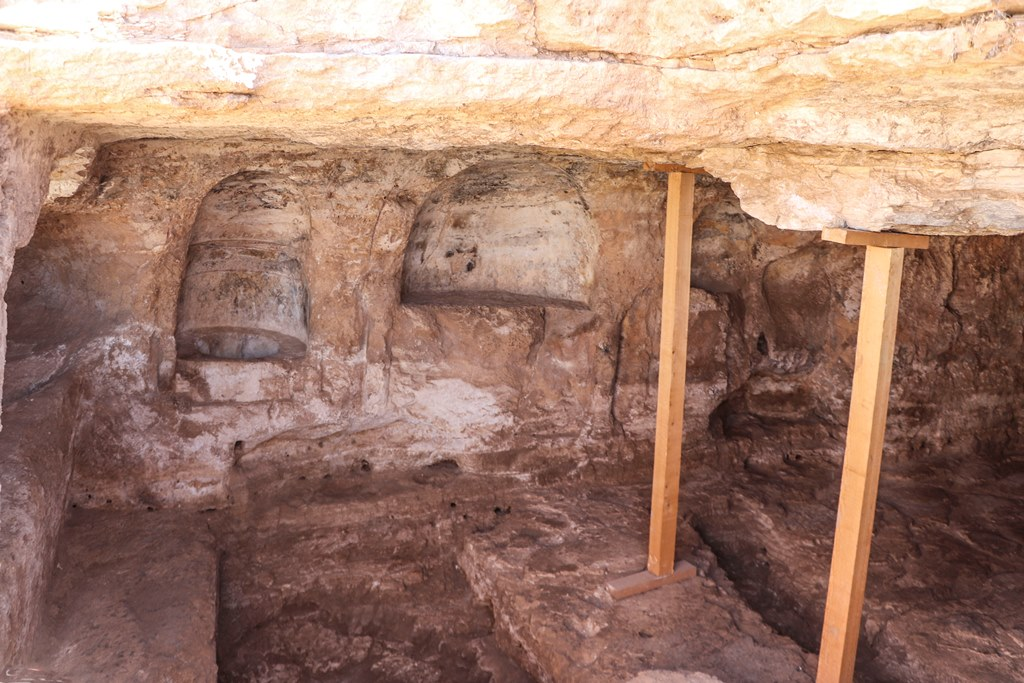
Mithraeum of Zerzevan Castle

The Mithraeum is one of the best-preserved structures of the castle. The 35 m^{2} structure carved into the main rock is 7 m long, 5 m wide, and 2.5 m high. On the eastern wall, there are columns carved into the rock, a large niche in the middle flanked by two smaller ones. The flaming crown, one of the symbols of Mithraism, is carved on the eastern wall. Right in front of the left-hand small niche there is a carved pool on the ground. Some inscriptions and symbols are visible at the entrance gate of the structure.

== Use as civilian settlement ==
A new settlement was created within the castle once again in the 1890s, when a family moved into the castle. As the population grew to over 30 households, the residents ultimately abandoned the castle in the 1960s, descended to a place about 1 km (0.62 mi) from the castle, and founded a village under the name Zerzevan. This village is called Demirölçek today.

== Gallery - Views of Zerzevan Castle ==
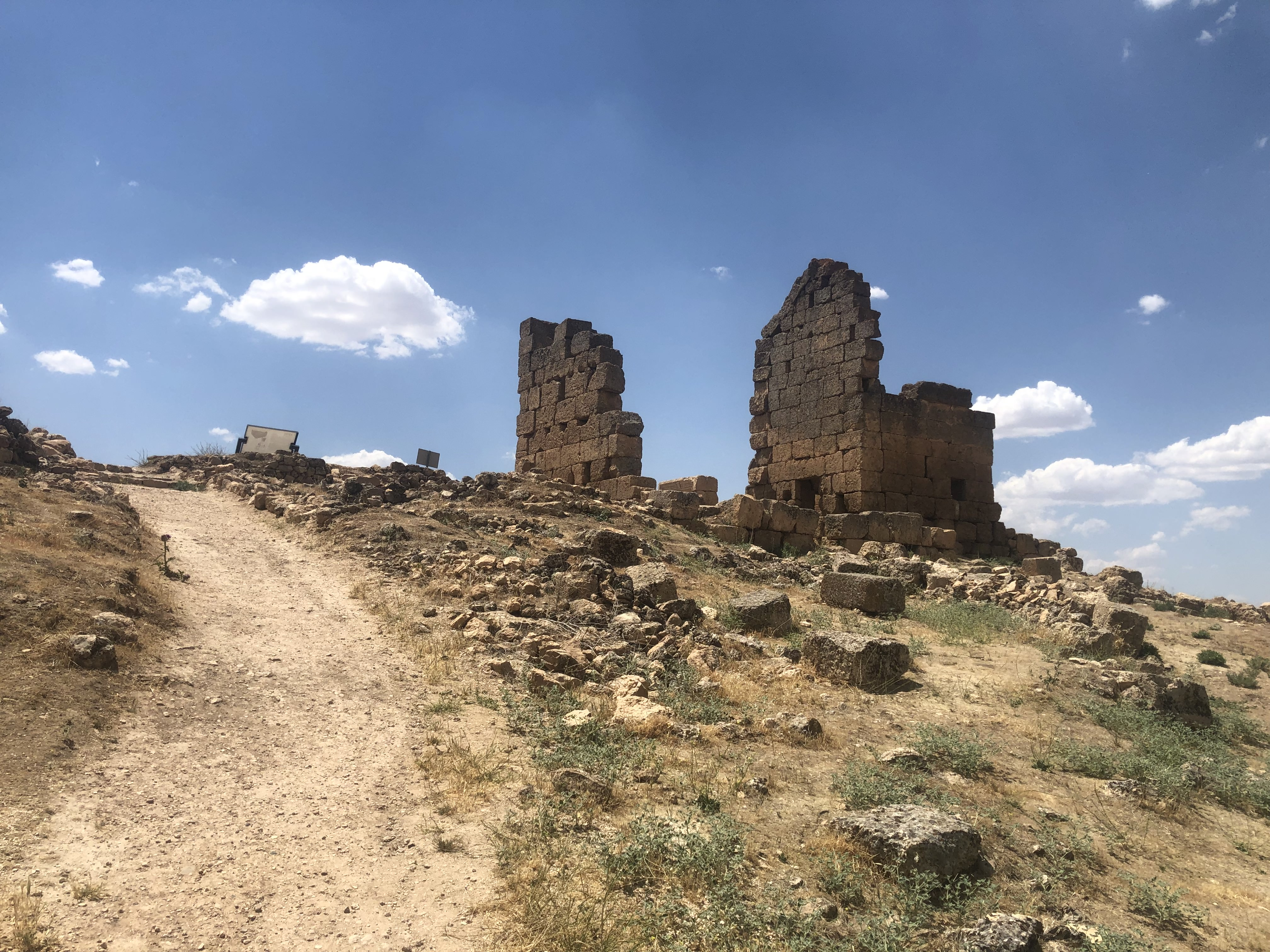

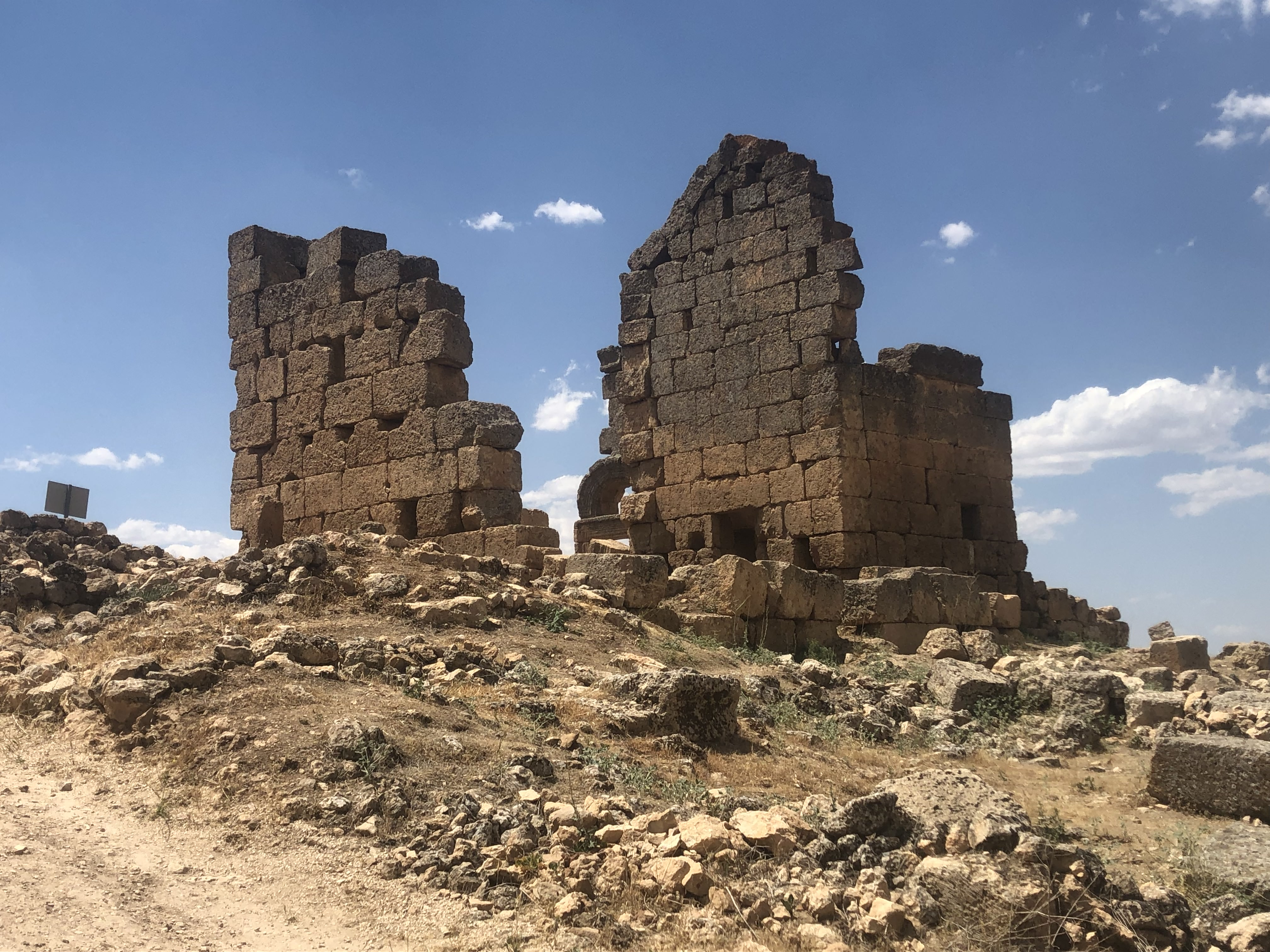

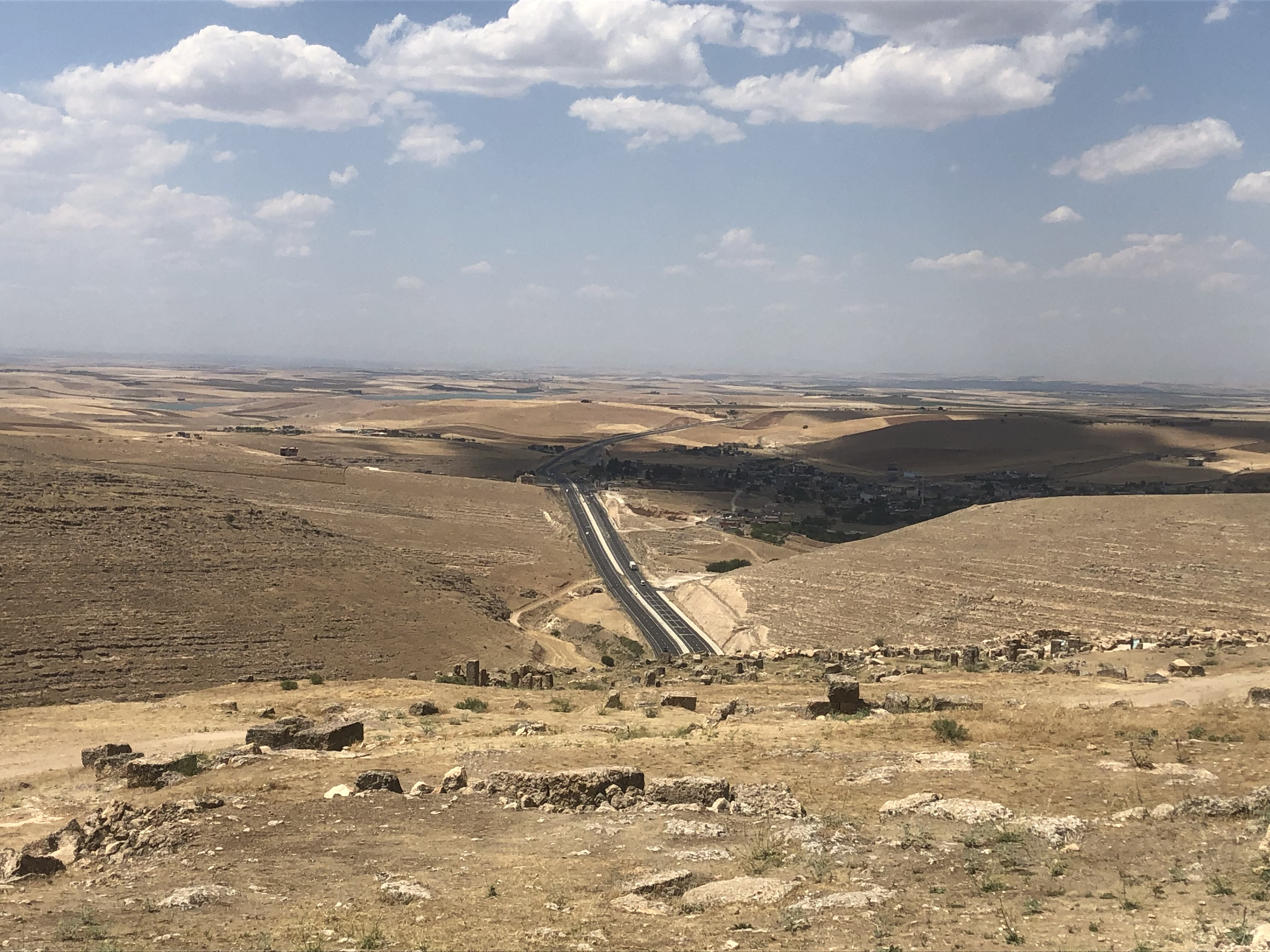

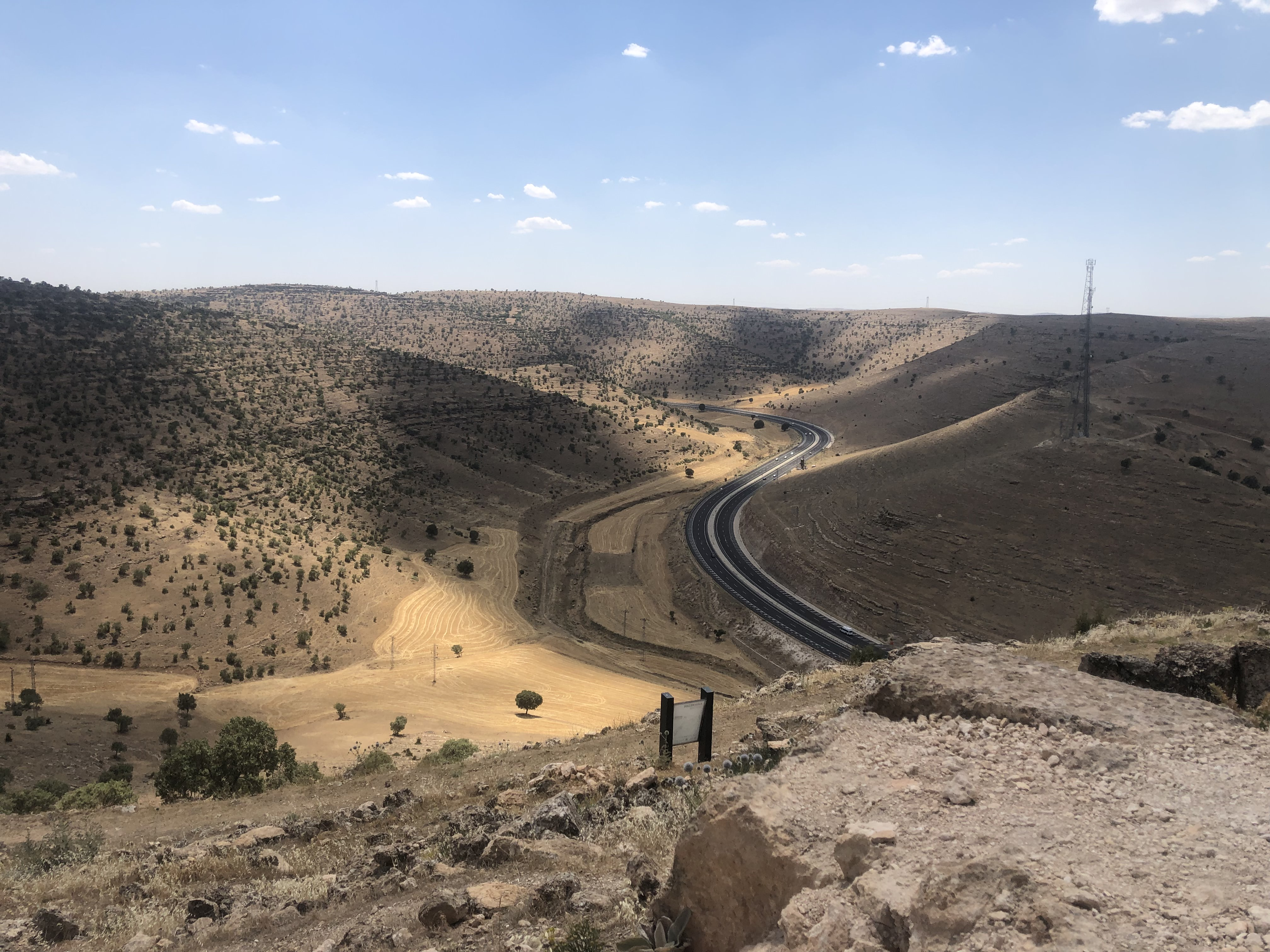
