= Svirachi =

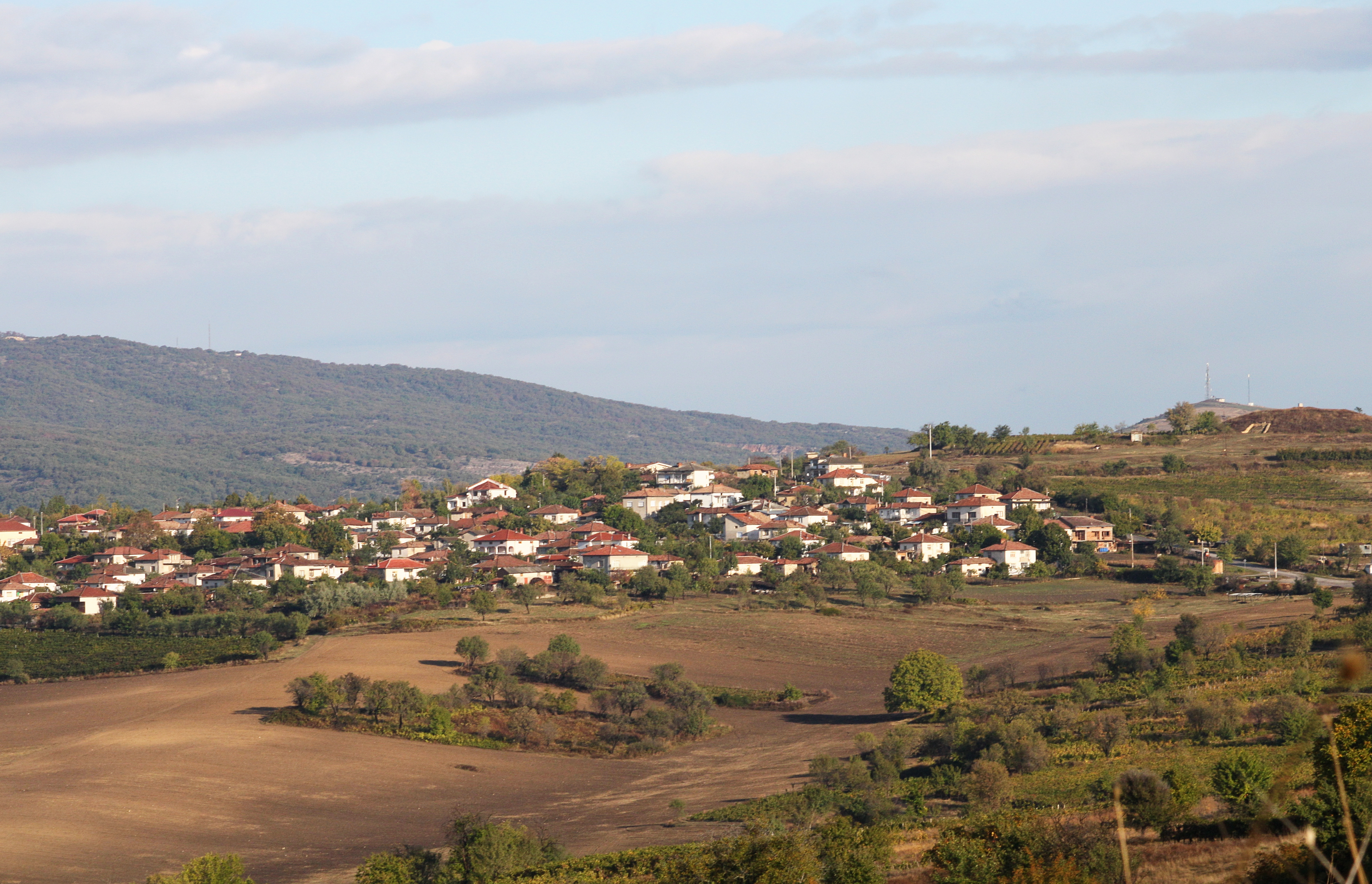

- Location of Svirachi
- Coordinates: 41°29′N 26°7′E
- Country: Bulgaria
- Provinces (Oblast): Haskovo

Government
  - Mayor: Tyanka Pehlivanova
- Elevation: 235 m (771 ft)

Population (2006)
  - Total: 400
- Time zone: UTC+2 (EET)
  - Summer (DST): UTC+3 (EEST)
- Postal Code: 6578
- Area code: 03665

Svirachi (Bulgarian: Свирачи) is a village in the Haskovo Province, southern Bulgaria. As of 2006 it has 400 inhabitants, which places it the largest village in Ivaylovgrad municipality. Inhabitants of Svirachi are Anatolian Bulgarians, Eastern Orthodox Bulgarians, whose ancestors are Bulgarian refugees from Anatolia. Its former name was Zurnazen or Zornazan, which is meant "Player of Zurna" in Turkish.

== Geography ==
It is located at altitude of 235 metres above the sea level, at 6 km to the south of Ivaylovgrad in Eastern Rhodope.

== Agriculture ==
Agriculture is the main occupation for the population. The main products are grapes, tobacco, sesame, chickpea, almonds. Livestock breeding is also well-developed, including mainly sheep, cattle, goats.

== Others ==
The village has a kindergarten, school, mladezhki dom with library. There is a church "Sv. Dimitar" built in 1859 At some kilometers to the northeast are located the ruins of an ancient Bulgarian fortress Lyutitsa.
