= Demirölçek, Çınar =

Village in Turkey

Demirölçek
- Neighbourhood
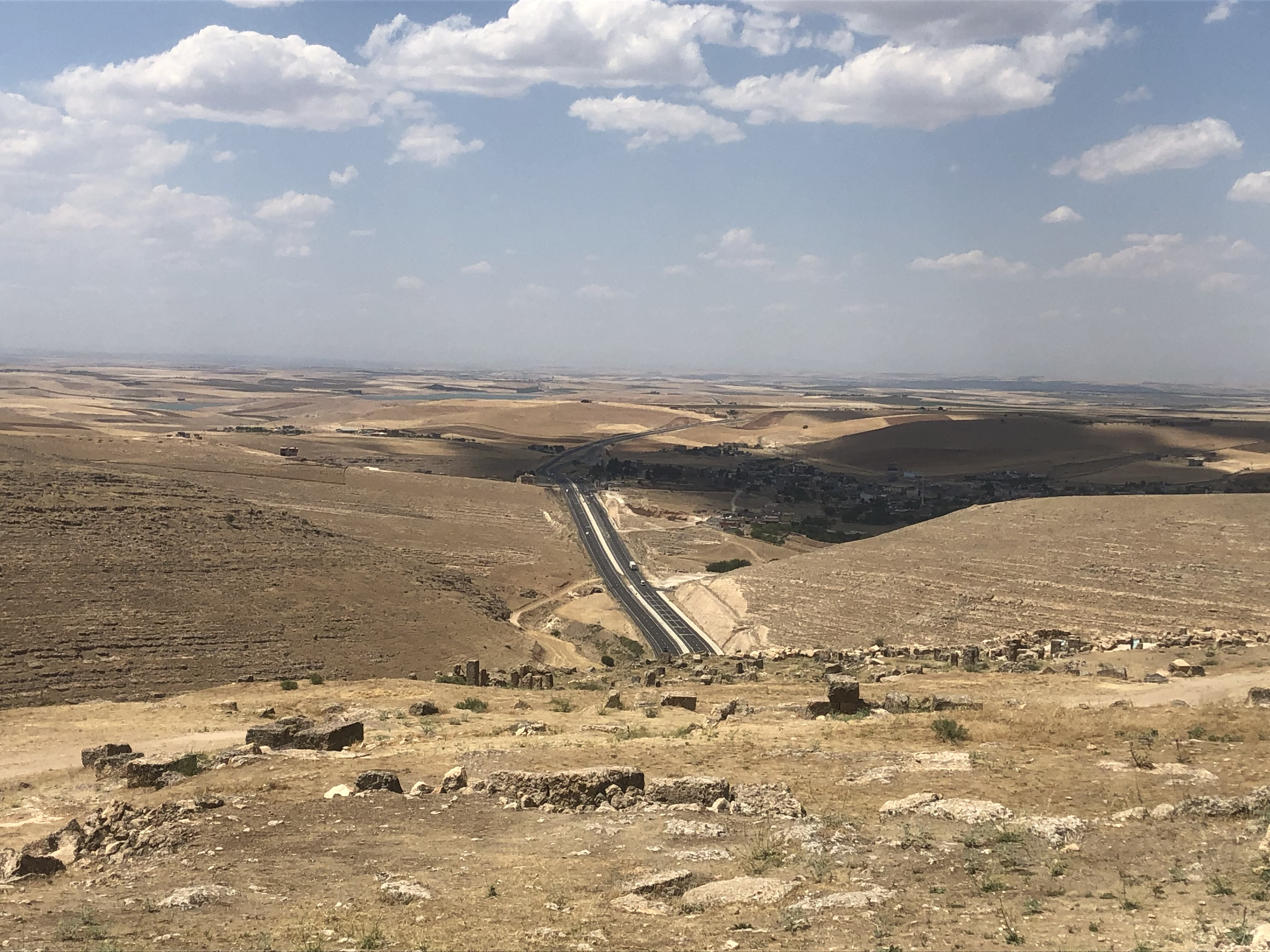

- Location within Turkey
- Coordinates: 37°37′N 40°30′E
- Country: Turkey
- Province: Diyarbakır
- District: Çınar
- Population (2022): 477
- Time zone: UTC+3 (TRT)

Demirölçek (Kurdish: Zerzewan) is a neighbourhood in the municipality and district of Çınar, Diyarbakır Province in Turkey. It is populated by Bulgarians and Kurds and had a population of 477 in 2022.

The Zerzevan Castle is located next to the village.
