= Church of Sts. Constantine and Helen (Edirne) =

Church in Edirne, Turkey

Coordinates: 41.66345°N 26.56423°E

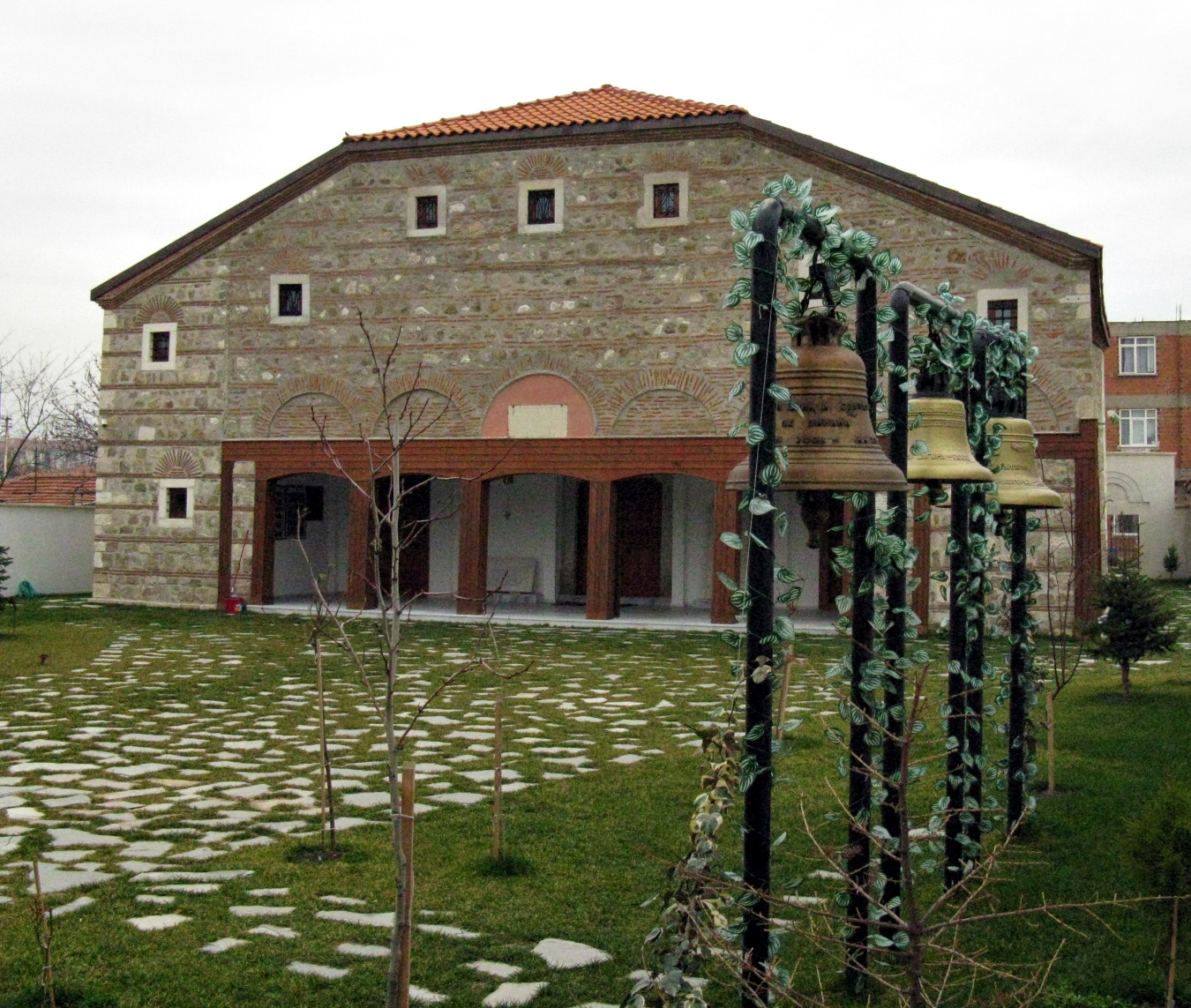
Front facade of the church

The Church of Saints Constantine and Helena (Bulgarian: Св. св. Константин и Елена) is a Bulgarian Orthodox church in Edirne in Turkey. Dedicated to Orthodox saints Constantine the Great and his mother Helena of Constantinople, it was built in 1869 in less than seven months and is a prime example of the Eastern Orthodox church architecture of the period.

== Location ==
The church is located in Edirne, in the district of Abdurahman, in the neighborhood of Uzunkaldırım.

== History ==
After long years of abandonment, the church was heavily renovated in 2008. The Bulgarian government partially funded the renovation project.
