= Hristo Fotev =

Hristo Konstantinov Fotev (Bulgarian: Христо Константинов Фотев; 25 March 1934 – 27 July 2002) was a Bulgarian poet.

Born in Istanbul, Turkey to Bulgarian parents, Fotev moved with his family to the Bulgarian Black Sea port city of Burgas in 1940. He published his first collection of poetry in 1960 and became a member of the Union of Bulgarian Writers in 1961. From 1964 on, he was the Union's creative secretary.

Fotev's lyrics often dealt with the topic of love, and the sea was a key poetic element and inspiration in his work.
