= Bulgaria–Turkey relations =

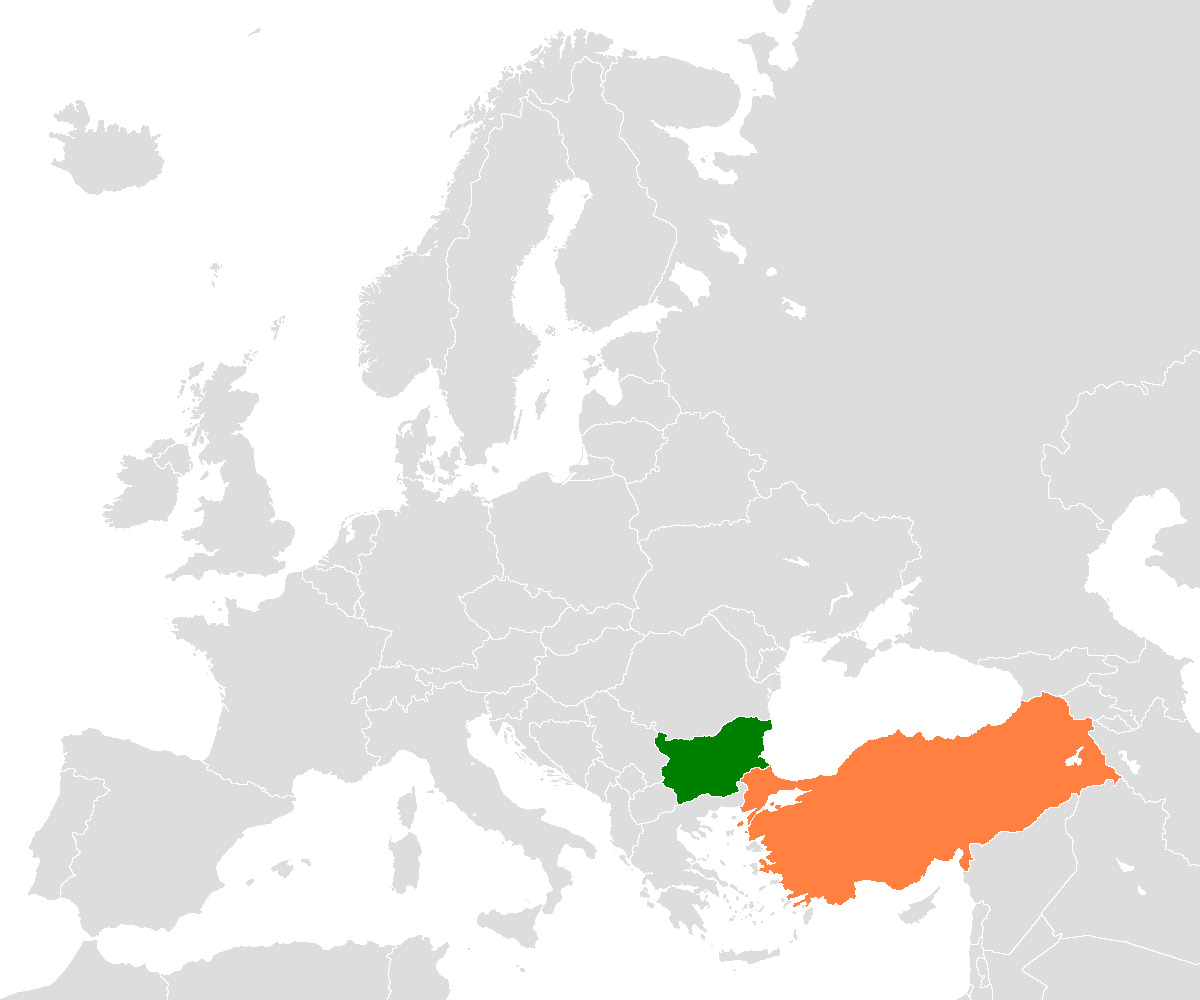

- Bulgaria: Turkey

Diplomatic mission
- Embassy of Bulgaria, Ankara: Embassy of Turkey, Sofia

Bulgaria–Turkey relations or the Turko–Bulgarian relations are the bilateral relations between the Republic of Bulgaria and the Republic of Türkiye. Bulgaria has an embassy in Ankara, two general consulates in Istanbul and Edirne and a chancellery in Bursa. Turkey has an embassy in Sofia and two general consulates in Plovdiv and Burgas. Both countries are full members of BSEC, the Council of Europe, NATO and of OSCE. Bulgaria is an EU member and Turkey is an EU candidate. Bulgaria supports Turkey's accession negotiations to the EU, although negotiations have now been suspended.

== History ==
The Bulgars were a Medieval nomadic population which the Bulgarians partly descend from. They were Turkic people inhabiting the Pontic steppe that migrated to the Balkans after the collapse of Old Great Bulgaria in the 7th century. After establishing the First Bulgarian Empire, the Bulgars had Slavicized and adopted Christianity. In the late 14th century, Orthodox Bulgaria competed with the Muslim Ottoman Turks for supremacy in the Balkans where after a series of wars it was defeated and subsequently incorporated into the Turkish Empire. Numerous Turks immigrated to Bulgaria during Turkish rule and in the Ottoman census of 1831, almost 37% of the population of Ottoman Bulgaria was Muslim. However, the Islamic population included not only Turks but also all other Muslims, including Pomaks, as many Bulgarians converted to Islam.

After the Russo-Turkish War (1877–1878) and the establishment of the Principality of Bulgaria and the autonomous province of Eastern Rumelia, a part of the Turkish population in the Bulgarian territories started migrating to areas held by Ottoman Turkey. Bulgaria's status as an Ottoman vassal, which came about through international mediation, existed only de jure, and Bulgaria recognized the suzerainty of Istanbul at best symbolically. Bulgaria had its own constitution, flag and anthem and pursued an independent foreign policy. From 1880 it also had its own currency. In 1885, Eastern Rumelia was de facto annexed by Bulgaria after a bloodless revolution, which the Ottoman Empire accepted with the Tophane Agreement. On 5 October 1908, Bulgaria finally declared its complete independence as the Kingdom of Bulgaria. In the Balkan Wars, Bulgaria was able to conquer more territories from the Ottomans and the current border between Bulgaria and Turkey was established in 1913 with the Treaty of Constantinople, which ended the state of war between the two sides.

During the First World War (1914)–1918), there were no armed conflicts between the Ottomans and the Bulgarians, as both concluded the Ottoman–Bulgarian alliance. The war led to the collapse of the Ottoman Empire, which was succeeded by the Republic of Turkey, which established diplomatic relations with Bulgaria, which recognized the mutual borders with the Treaty of Lausanne. In the interwar period, Turkey allied itself with Greece, Yugoslavia and Romania against Bulgaria and Hungary in the 1934 Balkan Entente. In the Second World War that soon followed, Turkey remained neutral, while Bulgaria cooperated with the Axis powers. After the end of the war, Bulgaria became a Soviet satellite state and part of the Warsaw Pact as the People's Republic of Bulgaria, while Turkey pursued a pro-Western foreign policy and joined NATO. Relations were also strained by discrimination against the Turkish minority by the Bulgarian communists, which led to attacks by the Turkish National Liberation Movement in Bulgaria. In the 1980s, just before the end of communist rule, the Bulgarian government had over 300,000 members of the Turkish minority deported to Turkey.

After the democratization of Bulgaria in the 1990s, Bulgarian Turks were granted minority rights. Bulgarian-Turkish relations subsequently improved. Both countries signed numerous agreements on intergovernmental cooperation and have intensified their economic relations. However, due to the high number of refugees from North Africa and the Middle East crossing the EU's external borders, Bulgaria began erecting a border fence on its border with Turkey in 2014.

== European Union ==
Bulgaria joined the EU in 2007. Turkey is still a candidate country for the EU, and membership negotiations have been effectively frozen since 2016. Bulgaria fully supports Turkey's EU membership process, as it has effectively frozen membership negotiations.

== NATO ==
Turkey joined NATO in 1952. Bulgaria joined NATO in 2004.

== Economic relations ==
Both countries are important economic partners for each other. Turkey is one of Bulgaria's top 5 trading partners and accounts for almost 8 percent of total foreign trade. Between 2020 and 2022, the bilateral trade volume rose from $4.8 to $7.4 billion. 1,500 Turkish companies are active in Bulgaria and have invested more than two billion US dollars in the country.

== Diplomacy ==
Republic of Bulgaria

- Ankara (Embassy)
- Istanbul (Consulate-General)
- Edirne (Consulate-General)

Republic of Türkiye

- Sofia (Embassy)
- Plovdiv (Consulate-General)
- Burgas (Consulate-General)

== See also ==
- Foreign relations of Bulgaria
- Foreign relations of Turkey
- Bulgarian Turks
- Bulgarian Turks in Turkey
- European Union–Turkey relations
- Bulgaria–Turkey border
- Turks in Bulgaria
- Turks in Europe
