= Expulsion of the Thracian Bulgarians =

Genocidal massacres of Thracian Vulgarians by the Ottoman Empire in 1913

Destruction of Thracian Bulgarians
- Part of late Ottoman genocides and the Second Balkan War
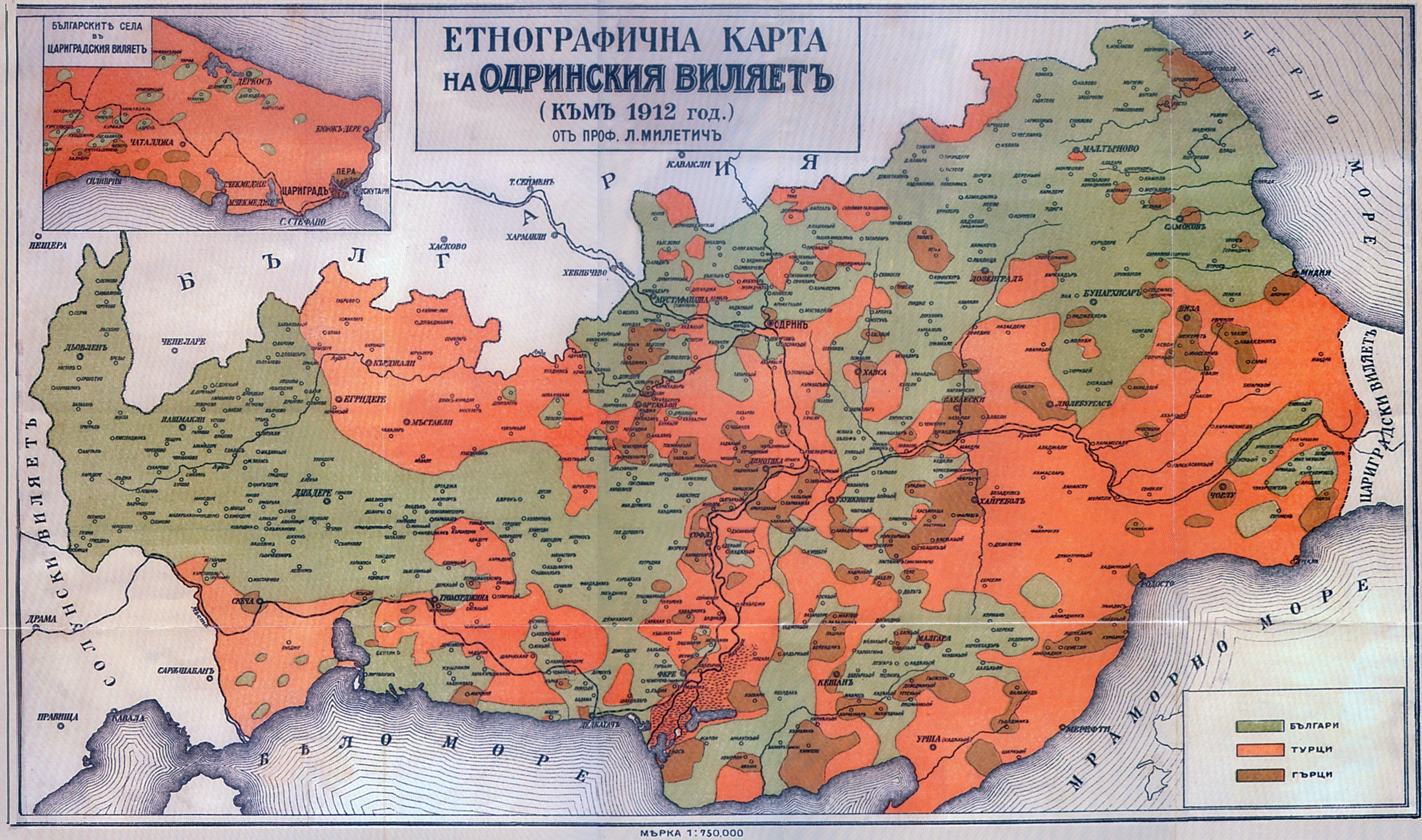
- Ethnic map of Adrianople Thrace in 1912 according to the academic Lyubomir Miletich. The areas with a Bulgarian majority are coloured green, Turkish red, and Greek brown.
- Location: Thrace
- Date: 1913
- Target: Thracian Bulgarians
- Attack type: Genocide, ethnic cleansing, arson
- Deaths: 50,000–60,000
- Victims: 350,000 (60,000 deaths, 290,000 displaced)
- Perpetrator: Ottoman Empire

The Destruction of the Thracian Bulgarians in 1913 (Bulgarian: Разорението на тракийските българи през 1913 г., Razorenieto na trakiyskite balgari prez 1913 g., also translated as "The Devastation" or "The Ruin of the Thracian Bulgarians in 1913") was the mass extermination and ethnic cleansing of the Bulgarian population in Eastern Thrace (now mainly in Edirne Province, Kırklareli Province and Tekirdağ Province in Turkey and Eastern Rhodope Mountains in Evros Prefecture in Greece) during the Second Balkan War and in a short period after it. On the other hand, Bulgarian Turks, Pomaks and Muslim Roma from Northern Thrace in Bulgaria, were expelled and settled in the whole Eastern Thrace in 1913. The events were documented in a book of the same name published by the Bulgarian academic Lyubomir Miletich in 1918.

== Events ==
When the military actions between Serbia, Greece, Montenegro and Romania against Bulgaria were in full progress, the Ottoman Empire took advantage of the situation to recover some of its former possessions in Thrace including Adrianople. In the beginning of July 1913 its forces crossed the Bulgarian border on the line Midiya-Enos, settled by the Treaty of London in May 1913. Because the Bulgarian troops had all been allocated to the front with Serbia and Greece, the Ottoman armies suffered no combat casualties and moved northwards and westwards without battles. Thus reoccupied territories were given back to the Ottoman Empire by the Treaty of Constantinople, signed on September 16. Despite that, the mass extermination and ethnic cleansing continued in the areas controlled by the Ottomans even after this date.

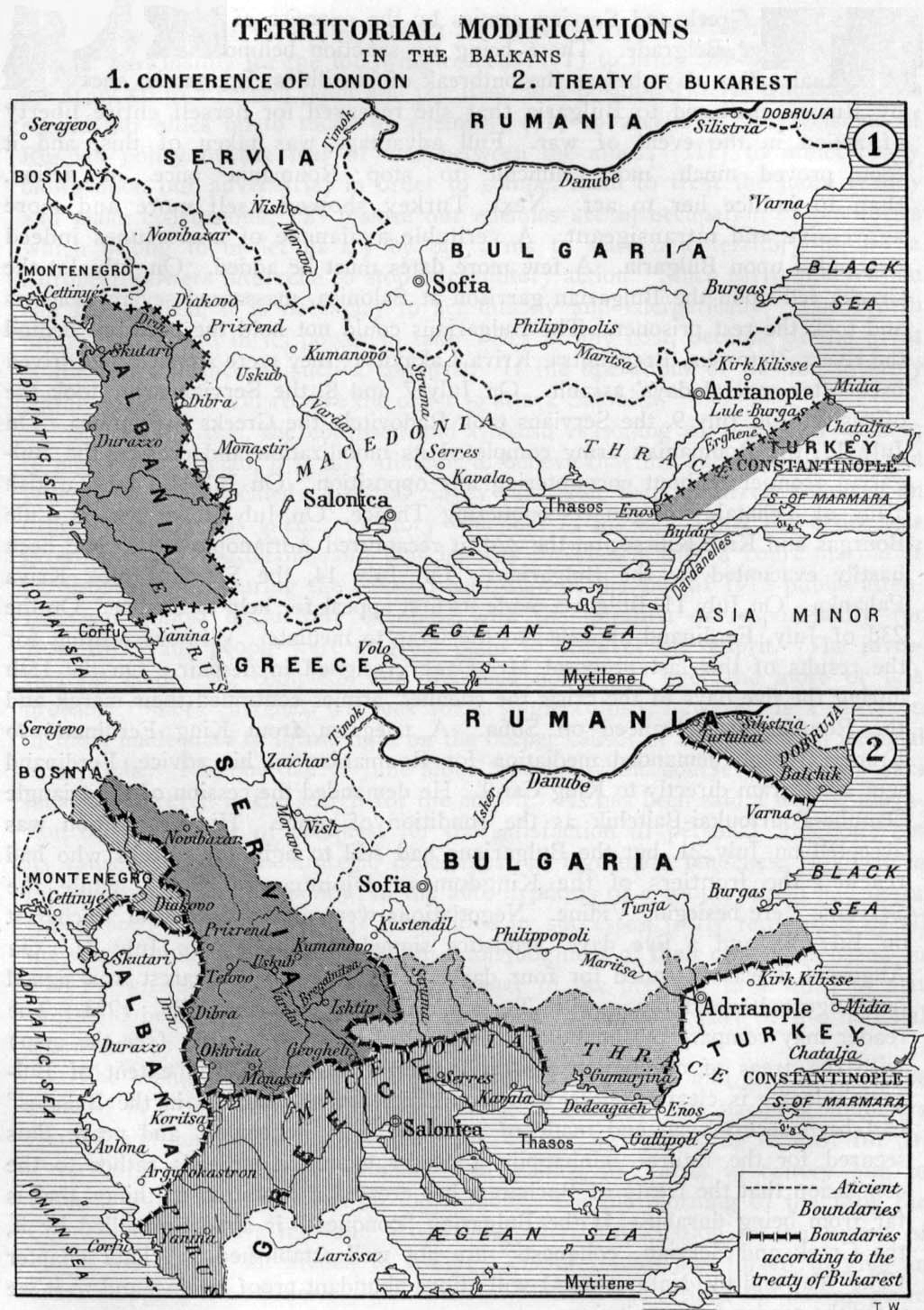
Balkan Wars boundaries.

Shortly after the end of the hostilities, the author interviewed hundreds of refugees from these regions, travelled himself in the places where these tragic events happened and systematically depicted in detail the atrocities, committed by the Young Turks' regular army and Ottoman paramilitary forces. As a result of this violent process, approximately 200,000 Bulgarians were killed or forced to leave their homes and properties forever, seeking salvation in territories, controlled by Bulgarian army and paramilitary formation Internal Macedonian Adrianople Revolutionary Organization. Ottoman military campaign lasted for a mere 3 weeks from 20 July 1913 to 10 August 1913. According to Carnegie Commission 15,960 Bulgarians were "either killed, burned in the houses or scattered among the mountains" and several thousands more were massacred in Western Thrace within this period.

There were also Bulgarians in Anatolia concentrated around Marmara region. A number of them during this period after the exchange agreements between the Kingdom of Bulgaria and Ottoman Empire after the Second Balkan War left while there were still 6,587 Bulgarians in Marmara region. The deportation of Thracian Bulgarians was signified with the exchange treaty where 46,764 Eastern Thracian Orthodox Christian Bulgarians and 48,570 Muslims (Turks, Pomaks, and Muslim Roma) from Northern Thrace were exchanged. After the exchange, in 1914 there still remained 14,908 Bulgarians belonging to the Bulgarian Exarchate in Ottoman Empire, 2,502 in Edirne, including the area that was ceded to Bulgaria in 1915, 3,339 in Constantinople and its environs and 338 in Çatalca. Their descendants in contemporary Bulgaria are about 800,000 people.

== Population estimates ==
Alongside the 1911 official Ottoman figures, Lyubomir Miletich made the following estimates of the ethnic composition, using linguistic criteria rather than religious affiliation:

Population estimates of Edirne Vilayet
Group	Ottoman 1893	Ottoman 1911	Miletich estimate
Muslims	434,366	795,706
Muslim Turks			NA
Muslim Bulgarians (Pomaks)			95,502
Greeks (EOC members)	267,220	395,872
(ethnic) Greeks			200,000–250,000
Bulgarians (BOC members)	102,245	171,055
Orthodox Bulgarians			203,224
Armenians	16,642	33,650
Catholics	1,024	12,783
Other	827	44,552
Total	836,041	1,426,632

The Ottoman authorities divided the population by religion, so all Patriarchists were counted as Greeks and the Pomaks as Muslims. The other two sources divided the population by language, so for example 24,970 Bulgarian patriarchists and 1700 Uniates were added by Miletich to the total figure for Orthodox Bulgarians.

== Illustrations ==
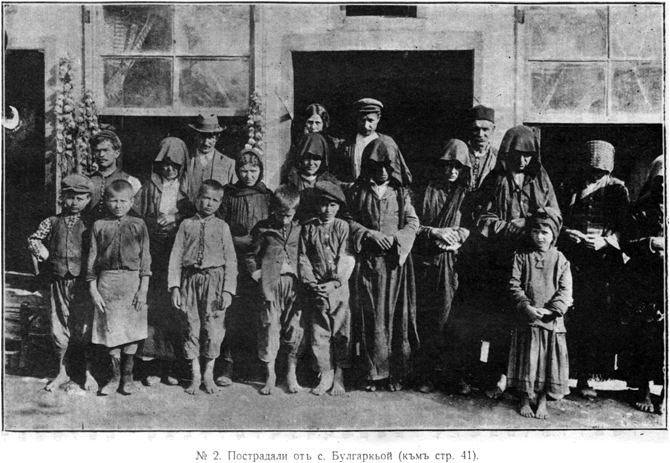
Bulgarian refugees from Bulgarkyoi (nowadays Ellinochori, Greece), 1913

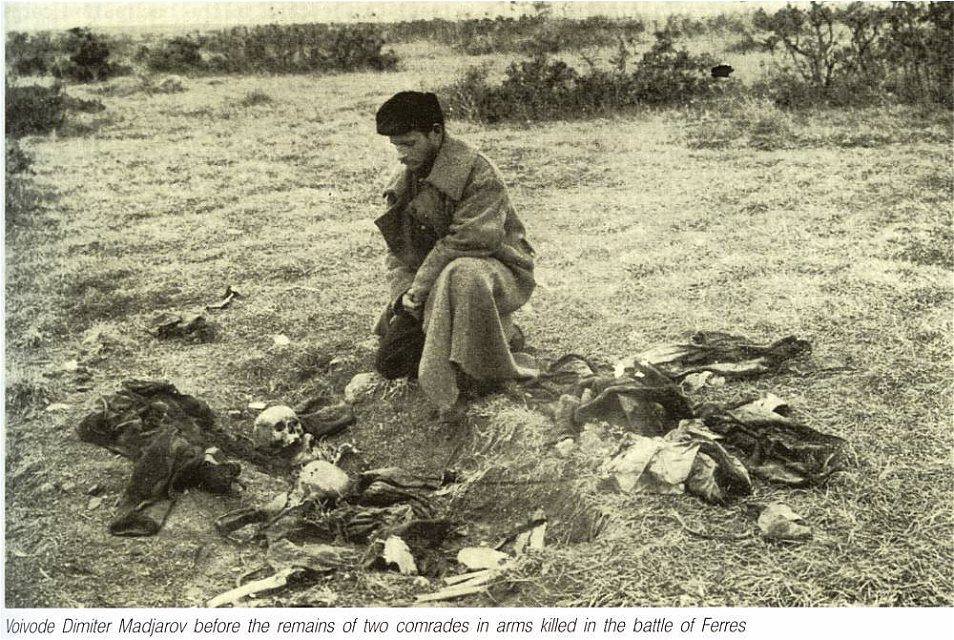
Remains of Bulgarians after the battle of Fere in 1913

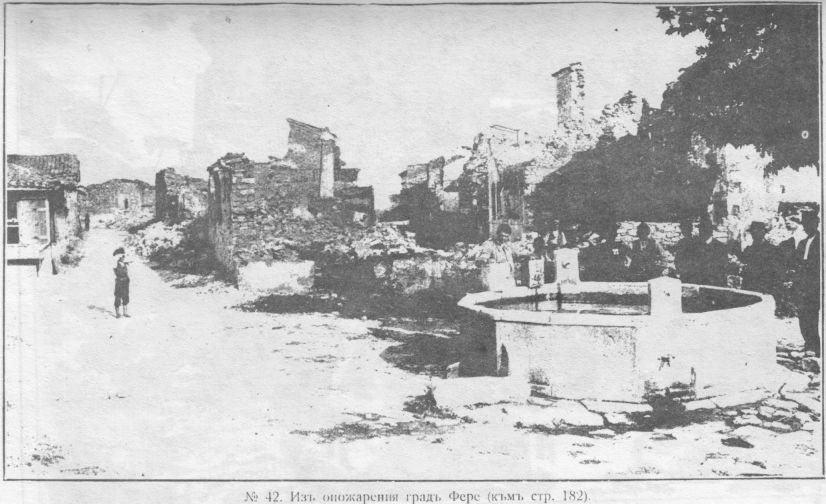
The ruins of Fere after the battle, 1913

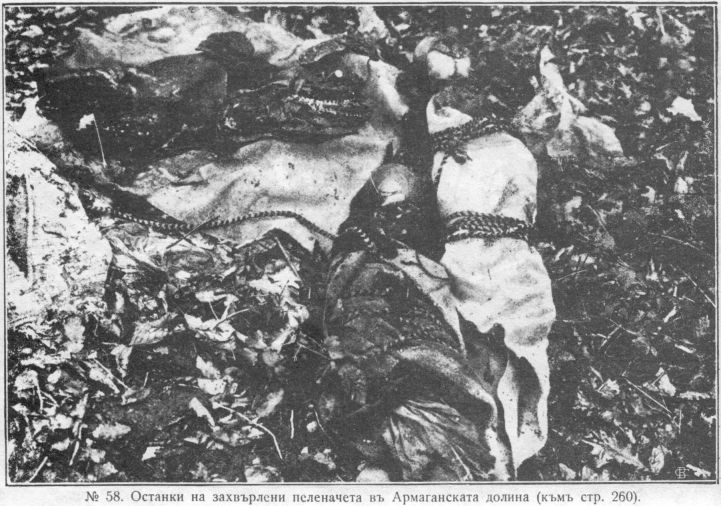
Dead Bulgarian infants in the Armaganska Valley, 1913
