= Thracian Bulgarians =

Bulgarians from the geographic region of Thrace

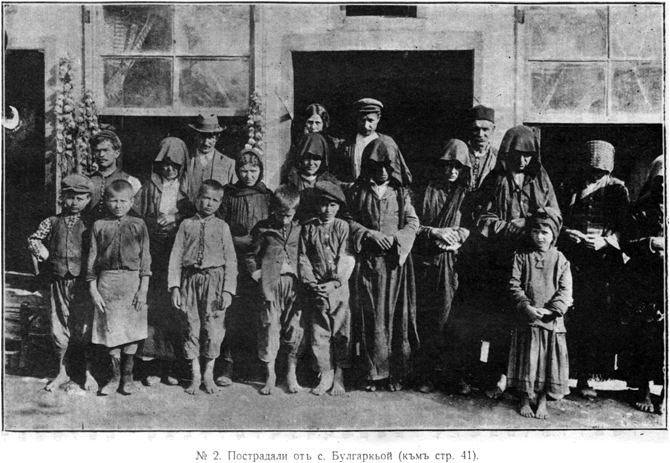
Bulgarian refugees from Eastern Thrace, expelled by the Ottomans, 1913.

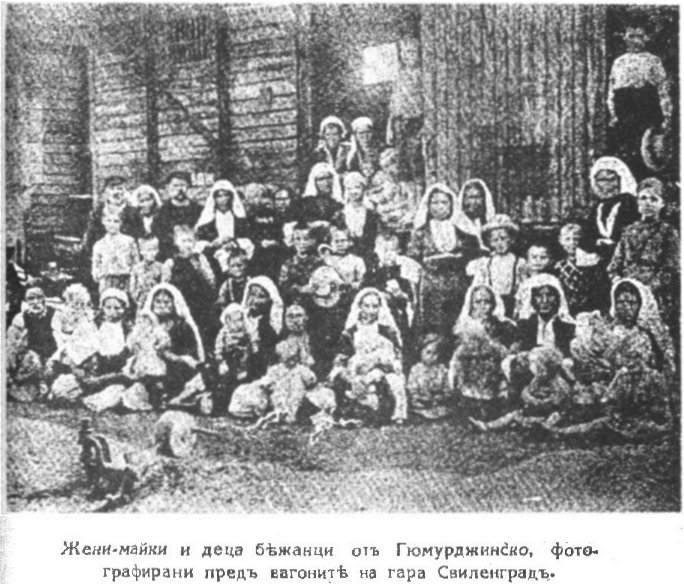
Bulgarian refugees from Komotini, expelled by the Greeks, 1924.

Thracians or Thracian Bulgarians (Bulgarian: Тракийски българи or Тракийци) are a regional, ethnographic group of ethnic Bulgarians, inhabiting or native to Thrace. Today, the larger part of this population is concentrated in Northern Thrace, but much is spread across the whole of Bulgaria and the diaspora.

Until the beginning of the twentieth century the Thracian Bulgarians were scattered in the whole of Thrace, then part of the Ottoman Empire. After the persecutions during the Preobrazhenie Uprising and the ethnic cleansing, caused to the Bulgarian population in Eastern Thrace after the Second Balkan War, these people were expelled from the area. After World War I, Bulgaria was required to cede Western Thrace to Greece. A whole population of Bulgarians in Western Thrace was expelled into Bulgaria-controlled Northern Thrace. This was followed by a further population exchange between Bulgaria and Greece (under the Treaty of Neuilly-sur-Seine), which radically changed the demographics of the region toward increased ethnic homogenization within the territories each respective country ultimately was awarded. At this period the Bulgarian Communist Party was compelled by Comintern to accept the formation of a new Thracian nation on the base of this people in order to include them in a new separate Thracian state, as a part of a future Balkan Communist Federation.

The last flow of Thracian refugees into Bulgaria was as the Bulgarian Army pulled out of the Serres-Drama region in late 1944.

With the accession of Bulgaria into the European Union, Bulgarian authorities appear to revisit the issue as a precondition for Turkey's membership to the Union.

Some Thracian Bulgarians still live in East Thrace in Turkey, descended from the people and families who converted to Islam in order to stay and avoid being deported during the genocide in 1913.

== See also ==
- Bulgarians
- Bulgarian millet
- Destruction of the Thracian Bulgarians in 1913
- Internal Thracian Revolutionary Organisation
- Bulgarian Macedonians
